= Memorial World Tour =

2011–2012 concert tour by Slipknot

- Tour by Slipknot
- Promotional poster for Slipknot's shows in Russia
- Location: Australia; Europe; North America; South America
- Start date: June 17, 2011
- End date: August 18, 2012
- Legs: 5
- No. of shows: 52

Slipknot concert chronology
- All Hope Is Gone World Tour (2008–2009); Memorial World Tour (2011–2012); Knotfest (2012)

The Memorial World Tour was a concert tour by American heavy metal band Slipknot in honor of late bassist Paul Gray who died on May 24, 2010. The tour was the group's first since the All Hope Is Gone World Tour which ended in 2009. The tour consisted mostly of festival dates and a small number of headlining appearances.

The band headlined the Sonisphere Festival in Finland, France, Sweden and the United Kingdom and co-headlined the festival in Greece, Turkey, Switzerland and Italy with Iron Maiden. They also headlined the Graspop Metal Meeting festival in Belgium. Finally, the band closed off 2011 by performing at the Rock in Rio festival held in Brazil alongside acts such as Metallica, Sepultura and others.

Drummer Joey Jordison announced that a live bassist, later confirmed as former Slipknot guitarist Donnie Steele, would fill in for Gray but would not be visible by the audience, instead performing behind Jordison. Vocalist Corey Taylor stated that he was willing to perform the shows for the fans, but at the time was hesitant about recording another Slipknot album in the near future due to the absence of Gray and his involvement with Stone Sour. Taylor doubted the future of Slipknot if the upcoming shows were unsuccessful. Percussionist Shawn Crahan along with Taylor both expressed interest in bringing the tour to the United States. Corey Taylor later confirmed via Twitter that a U.S. leg of the tour was planned.

The band scheduled three headlining shows of their own on the European leg, two shows in Russia and the latter in Berlin, Germany to compensate for the cancellation of the Bulgarian edition of the Sonisphere Festival.

On February 8, 2012, it was announced Slipknot would be returning to North America for the Mayhem Festival tour of 2012. Before the first show of the tour, it was reported that guitarist Jim Root would have to sit out multiple dates after his appendix had burst. Nick Hipa and Phil Sgrosso (of As I Lay Dying) stepped in and played guitar backstage. On July 13, Root recovered and returned to the band.

In the ongoing tour, the band members also wore their red jumpsuits from the self-titled album. Sid, Chris, and Shawn wore their old self-titled masks for the whole show. Corey and Jim wore their self-titled masks for half of the show and wore their All Hope Is Gone masks for the other half. Mick, Joey, and Craig wore their All Hope Is Gone masks for the whole show. An effigy of Paul Gray stood between Craig and Joey's drum kit. The effigy included Paul's self-titled mask, his self-titled jumpsuit and his left-handed bass guitar beside it. For the American leg of the tour, they wore their red Iowa jumpsuits along with some matching to their Iowa masks. This was the last Slipknot tour to feature drummer Joey Jordison before he was fired from the band in December 2013.

== Tour dates ==
Date	City	Country	Venue
Europe
June 17, 2011^{[1]}	Athens	Greece	Terra Vibe Park
June 19, 2011^{[1]}	Istanbul	Turkey	Küçükçiftlik Park
June 21, 2011	Berlin	Germany	Columbiahalle
June 24, 2011^{[1]}	Basel	Switzerland	St. Jakobs Gelände
June 25, 2011^{[1]}	Imola	Italy	Autodromo Enzo e Dino Ferrari
June 26, 2011	Dessel	Belgium	Graspop Metal Meeting
June 29, 2011	Moscow	Russia	Olimpiyskiy Stadion
June 30, 2011	Saint Petersburg	Russia	Ice Palace Saint Petersburg
July 2, 2011^{[1]}	Helsinki	Finland	Kalasatama
July 8, 2011^{[1]}	Amnéville	France	Snowhall Parc
July 9, 2011^{[1]}	Stockholm	Sweden	Globen Arena Open Air
July 10, 2011^{[1]}	Stevenage	England	Knebworth House
South America
September 25, 2011	Rio de Janeiro	Brazil	Rock in Rio Festival
Australia ("Soundwave Festival")
February 25, 2012	Brisbane	Australia	RNA Showgrounds
February 26, 2012	Sydney	Australia	Sydney Olympic Park
February 27, 2012^{[2]}	Sydney	Australia	Sydney Entertainment Centre
March 1, 2012^{[2]}	Melbourne	Australia	Rod Laver Arena
March 2, 2012	Melbourne	Australia	Melbourne Showgrounds
March 3, 2012	Adelaide	Australia	Bonython Park
March 5, 2012	Perth	Australia	Claremont Showground
North America ("Mayhem Festival")
June 30, 2012	San Bernardino	United States	San Manuel Amphitheater
July 1, 2012	Mountain View	United States	Shoreline Amphitheatre
July 3, 2012	Auburn	United States	White River Amphitheatre
July 4, 2012	Nampa	United States	Idaho Center Amphitheatre
July 6, 2012	Phoenix	United States	Ashley Furniture HomeStore Pavilion
July 7, 2012	Albuquerque	United States	Hard Rock Casino
July 8, 2012	Greenwood Village	United States	Comfort Dental Amphitheatre
July 10, 2012	Dallas	United States	Gexa Energy Pavilion
July 11, 2012	The Woodlands	United States	Cynthia Woods Mitchell Pavilion
July 13, 2012	Tampa	United States	1-800-ASK-GARY Amphitheatre
July 14, 2012	Atlanta	United States	Aaron's Amphitheatre at Lakewood
July 15, 2012	Noblesville	United States	Klipsch Music Center
July 18, 2012	Oklahoma City	United States	Zoo Amphitheatre
July 20, 2012	Maryland Heights	United States	Verizon Wireless Amphitheater
July 21, 2012	Tinley Park	United States	First Midwest Bank Amphitheatre
July 22, 2012	Clarkston	United States	DTE Energy Music Theatre
July 24, 2012	Cincinnati	United States	Riverbend Music Center
July 25, 2012	Cuyahoga Falls	United States	Blossom Music Center
July 27, 2012	Camden	United States	Susquehanna Bank Center
July 28, 2012	Burgettstown	United States	First Niagara Pavilion
July 29, 2012	Bristow	United States	Jiffy Lube Live
July 31, 2012	Saratoga Springs	United States	Saratoga Performing Arts Center
August 1, 2012	Corfu	United States	Darien Lake Performing Arts Center
August 3, 2012	Mansfield	United States	Comcast Center
August 4, 2012	Scranton	United States	Toyota Pavilion
August 5, 2012	Hartford	United States	Comcast Theatre
North America, Leg#2
August 8, 2012	Holmdel	United States	PNC Bank Arts Center
August 9, 2012	Laconia	United States	Meadowbrook U.S. Cellular Pavilion
August 11, 2012	Toronto	Canada	Heavy T.O. Festival
August 12, 2012	Montreal	Canada	Heavy MTL Festival
August 17, 2012	Pacific Junction	United States	Knotfest
August 18, 2012	Somerset	United States	Knotfest

- 1 Sonisphere Festival appearance.
- 2 Headline dates, non Soundwave Festival appearance.

Cancellations

June 21, 2011	Sofia	Bulgaria	Natsionalen Khipodrum Bankya (Sonisphere Festival)	Event cancelled by promoter for undisclosed reasons

== Setlist ==
The setlist for the tour is composed mainly of songs from the band's debut album, Slipknot, to coincide with the stage set and apparel used on stage. The majority of the songs performed on the tour were written by or had a significant contribution in the writing process by former bassist Paul Gray.

2011 Setlist
1. "742617000027" (from Slipknot, 1999)
2. "(sic)" (from Slipknot, 1999)
3. "Eyeless" (from Slipknot, 1999)
4. "Wait and Bleed" (from Slipknot, 1999)
5. "The Blister Exists" (from Vol. 3: The Subliminal Verses, 2004)
6. "Liberate" (from Slipknot, 1999)
7. "Before I Forget" (from Vol. 3: The Subliminal Verses, 2004)
8. "Pulse of the Maggots" (from Vol. 3: The Subliminal Verses, 2004)
9. "Frail Limb Nursery" (from Slipknot, 1999)
10. "Purity" (from "Slipknot", 1999)
11. "Left Behind" (from "Iowa", 2001)
12. "Disasterpiece" (from Iowa, 2001)
13. "Psychosocial" (from All Hope Is Gone, 2008)
14. "The Heretic Anthem" (from Iowa, 2001)
15. "Duality" (from Vol. 3: The Subliminal Verses, 2004)
16. "Only One" (from "Slipknot", 1999)
17. "Spit It Out" (from Slipknot, 1999)
18. "People = Shit" (from Iowa, 2001)
19. "Surfacing" (from Slipknot, 1999)

Notes:

- "Frail Limb Nursery" (from Slipknot, 1999), "Purity" (from Slipknot, 1999) and "Left Behind" (from Iowa, 2001) were omitted from the setlist in Athens, Istanbul, Basel and Rio de Janeiro.
- "Liberate" (from Slipknot, 1999) and "Pulse of the Maggots" (from Vol. 3: The Subliminal Verses, 2004) were omitted from the setlist in Imola, Italy.
- "Only One" (from Slipknot, 1999) was omitted from the setlist in Athens, Istanbul, Imola, Basel, Dessel and Rio de Janeiro.
Soundwave Festival Setlist
1. "742617000027" (from Slipknot, 1999)
2. "(sic)" (from Slipknot, 1999)
3. "Eyeless " (from Slipknot, 1999)
4. "Wait and Bleed" (from Slipknot, 1999)
5. "The Blister Exists" (from Vol. 3: The Subliminal Verses, 2004)
6. "Liberate" (from Slipknot, 1999)
7. "Before I Forget" (from Vol. 3: The Subliminal Verses, 2004)
8. "Pulse of the Maggots" (from Vol. 3: The Subliminal Verses, 2004)
9. "Left Behind" (from Iowa, 2001)
10. "Disasterpiece" (from Iowa, 2001)
11. "Psychosocial" (from All Hope Is Gone, 2008)
12. "The Heretic Anthem" (from Iowa, 2001)
13. "Duality" (from Vol. 3: The Subliminal Verses, 2004)
14. "Spit It Out" (from Slipknot, 1999)
15. "People = Shit" (from Iowa, 2001)
16. "Surfacing" (from Slipknot, 1999)

Notes:

- "Sulfur" (from All Hope Is Gone, 2008) was performed instead "Liberate" (from Slipknot, 1999) in Sydney, Australia (February 27, 2012) and Melbourne, Australia (March 1, 2012)
- "Dead Memories" (from All Hope Is Gone, 2008) was performed instead "Left Behind" (from Iowa, 2001) in Sydney, Australia (February 27, 2012) and Melbourne, Australia (March 1, 2012)
- "Vermillion" (from Vol. 3: The Subliminal Verses, 2004), "Everything Ends" (from Iowa, 2001) and "Only One" (from Slipknot, 1999) were additionally performed in Sydney, Australia (February 27, 2012) and Melbourne, Australia (March 1, 2012).
- "Snuff" (from All Hope Is Gone, 2008) was additionally performed only in Melbourne, Australia (March 1, 2012).
North America Setlist
1. "742617000027" (from Slipknot, 1999)
2. "(sic)" (from Slipknot, 1999)
3. "Eyeless " (from Slipknot, 1999)
4. "Sulfur" (from All Hope Is Gone, 2008)
5. "Wait and Bleed" (from Slipknot, 1999)
6. "Before I Forget" (from Vol. 3: The Subliminal Verses, 2004)
7. "Disasterpiece" (from Iowa, 2001)
8. "Gently" (from Iowa, 2001)
9. "Vermillion" (from Vol. 3: The Subliminal Verses, 2004)
10. "The Heretic Anthem" (from Iowa, 2001)
11. "Psychosocial" (from All Hope Is Gone, 2008)
12. "Duality" (from Vol. 3: The Subliminal Verses, 2004)
13. "Spit It Out" (from Slipknot, 1999)
14. "(515)" (from Iowa, 2001)
15. "People = Shit" (from Iowa, 2001)
16. "Surfacing" (from Slipknot, 1999)

Notes:

- "The Blister Exists" (from Vol. 3: The Subliminal Verses, 2004) was additionally performed in San Bernardino, Holmdel, Laconia, Toronto, Montreal, Pacific Junction and Somerset.
- "Pulse of the Maggots" (from Vol. 3: The Subliminal Verses, 2004) was additionally performed in San Bernardino, Holmdel, Laconia, Toronto, Montreal and Pacific Junction.
- "Everything Ends" (from Iowa, 2001) was additionally performed in Holmdel, Laconia, Toronto, Montreal, Pacific Junction and Somerset.
- "Snuff" (from All Hope Is Gone, 2008) was additionally performed in Holmdel, Laconia, Toronto and Montreal.
- "(515)" (from Iowa, 2001) was not played in Holmdel, Laconia, Toronto, Montreal and Pacific Junction.

After each time a concert ends, the members, as a tribute to Paul, stand beside his effigy for a few minutes while "'Til We Die" is being played in the background.

== Personnel ==
- (#0) Sid Wilson – turntables
- (#1) Joey Jordison – drums
- (#3) Chris Fehn – percussion, backing vocals
- (#4) Jim Root – guitars
- (#5) Craig Jones – sampling, media
- (#6) Shawn Crahan – percussion, backing vocals
- (#7) Mick Thomson – guitars
- (#8) Corey Taylor – lead vocals
- Donnie Steele – bass (Off stage)
