= Antennas to Hell =

Greatest hits album by Slipknot
- Released: July 23, 2012
- Recorded: 1998–2009
- Genres: Alternative metal; nu metal
- Length: 77:07
- Label: Roadrunner
- Producers: Slipknot; Ross Robinson; Rick Rubin; Dave Fortman

Slipknot chronology
All Hope Is Gone (2008)	Antennas to Hell (2012)	.5: The Gray Chapter (2014)

Antennas to Hell is the first greatest hits compilation album by American Nu-Metal band Slipknot. The album was released on July 23, 2012, in the United Kingdom and July 24, 2012, in the United States by Roadrunner Records. The album features hit singles, fan favorites, and live tracks. The two-disc version of Antennas to Hell features a bonus live CD capturing Slipknot's performance at the 2009 Download Festival in Donington Park, England. The three-disc version includes a bonus DVD featuring every Slipknot music video and ten brand new video features, titled "Broadcasts from Hell", created by Shawn Crahan. It is the first album released by the band since late bassist Paul Gray's death in 2010. Despite being a greatest hits collection, percussionist Shawn "Clown" Crahan has stated that "it's more of a tribute to what Slipknot were and used to be at the time of the songs", and also said that the collection comes with much artwork and DVD content.

== Reception ==
=== Critical ===
Professional ratings
Review scores
Source	Rating
AllMusic	4/5 stars
Artistdirect	5/5 stars
CraveOnline	9/10
FasterLouder	9/10 stars
God Is in the TV	3/5
The New Zealand Herald	4/5 stars
Record Collector	4/5 stars

Antennas to Hell has been very well received by critics. Rick Florino of Artistdirect stated that, "Their track record continues to be flawless and, unlike many of their contemporaries, they've outlasted nu metal, metalcore, and any other trends imaginable. They're rock's proverbial last men standing, and Antennas to Hell perfectly covers their now legendary career with highlights from each release and some mind-blowing bonuses."

=== Commercial ===
The album debuted at number 18 on the U.S. Billboard 200 with sales of more than 16,000 copies in its first week.

== Artwork ==
The cover art features a dark sky blue background with the devil's head. The band's "S" logo is also seen above the head. The back cover features a black background and one of the devil's horns. On the inside, the CD tray features the late Paul Gray's blue house. The address says 6421 and also a half 6421. The doors are a wooden door and a screen door. The screen door leads to Gray's home and the wooden door leads to the room where the cover artwork was taken. The back of the booklet features a replica of the devil's head on a table. The CD shows a concrete background with black nails scattered all over the place.

== Track listing ==
All tracks are written by Slipknot. (Note: Jim Root did not receive writing credits for songs from the band's self-titled album.)

Disc one
No.	Title	Original release	Length
1.	"(sic)"	Slipknot	3:19
2.	"Eyeless"	Slipknot	3:56
3.	"Wait and Bleed"	Slipknot	2:27
4.	"Spit It Out"	Slipknot	2:39
5.	"Surfacing"	Slipknot	3:38
6.	"People = Shit"	Iowa	3:35
7.	"Disasterpiece"	Iowa	5:08
8.	"Left Behind"	Iowa	4:01
9.	"My Plague" (New Abuse mix)	Resident Evil Soundtrack/Iowa (original)	3:02
10.	"The Heretic Anthem" (live)	Disasterpieces/Iowa (original)	4:04
11.	"Purity" (live)	Disasterpieces/Slipknot (original)	4:35
12.	"Pulse of the Maggots"	Vol. 3: (The Subliminal Verses)	4:24
13.	"Duality"	Vol. 3: (The Subliminal Verses)	4:12
14.	"Before I Forget"	Vol. 3: (The Subliminal Verses)	4:24
15.	"Vermilion" (Terry Date mix)	Vol. 3: (The Subliminal Verses)	5:25
16.	"Sulfur"	All Hope Is Gone	4:37
17.	"Psychosocial"	All Hope Is Gone	4:43
18.	"Dead Memories"	All Hope Is Gone	4:27
19.	"Snuff"	All Hope Is Gone	4:40
Total length:			77:07

Disc two (sic)nesses (live at the Download Festival, 2009)
No.	Title	Length
1.	"(sic)"	3:45
2.	"Eyeless"	4:11
3.	"Wait and Bleed"	2:46
4.	"Get This"	4:05
5.	"Before I Forget"	4:23
6.	"Sulfur"	4:17
7.	"The Blister Exists"	5:25
8.	"Dead Memories"	4:04
9.	"Left Behind"	3:23
10.	"Disasterpiece"	5:00
11.	"Vermilion"	6:16
12.	"Everything Ends"	4:42
13.	"Psychosocial"	5:07
14.	"Duality"	4:46
15.	"People = Shit"	5:05
16.	"Surfacing"	4:21
17.	"Spit It Out"	7:11
Total length:		78:47

Disc three: The Complete Music Videos
No.	Title	Length
1.	"Spit It Out"	3:00
2.	"Surfacing"	3:57
3.	"Wait and Bleed"	3:04
4.	"Wait and Bleed" (animated)	3:20
5.	"Scissors"	8:23
6.	"Left Behind"	3:38
7.	"My Plague"	2:57
8.	"People = Shit" (live)	3:39
9.	"The Heretic Anthem" (live)	4:02
10.	"Duality"	3:34
11.	"Vermilion"	4:15
12.	"Vermillion Pt. 2"	3:52
13.	"Before I Forget"	4:02
14.	"The Nameless" (live)	4:48
15.	"The Blister Exists"	5:36
16.	"Psychosocial"	5:02
17.	"Dead Memories"	4:58
18.	"Sulfur"	5:03
19.	"Snuff"	6:11
20.	"Psychosocial" (live)	4:43
21.	"Broadcasts from Hell"

== Personnel ==
Aside from their real names, members of the band are referred to by numbers zero through eight.

Slipknot

- (#8) Corey Taylor – vocals, acoustic guitar on "Snuff"
- (#7) Mick Thomson – guitars
- (#6) Shawn "Clown" Crahan – percussion, backing vocals
- (#5) Craig "133" Jones – samples, media, keyboards
- (#4) Josh Brainard – guitars, backing vocals (tracks 1–5)
- (#4) Jim Root – guitars (tracks 6–19)
- (#3) Greg “Cuddles” Welts – percussion, backing vocals (track 4)
- (#3) Chris Fehn – percussion, backing vocals
- (#2) Paul Gray – bass, backing vocals
- (#1) Joey Jordison – drums
- (#0) Sid Wilson – turntables, keyboards

Production

- Ross Robinson – production (tracks 1–3, 5–9), mixing (tracks 1–3, 5)
- Slipknot – production (tracks 4, 6–11, 16–19), co-production (tracks 1–3, 5)
- Rick Rubin – production (tracks 12–15)
- Dave Fortman – production (tracks 16–19)
- Chuck Johnson — engineering and mixing (tracks 1–3, 5)
- Sean McMahon – engineering and mixing (track 4)
- Mike Fraser – engineering (tracks 6–9)
- Francois LaMoureux – recording (tracks 10–11)
- Will Shapland – recording (tracks 10–11)
- Greg Fidelman – recording (tracks 12–15), mixing (tracks 12–14)
- Jeremy Parker – engineering (tracks 16–19)
- Matt Sepanic – additional engineering (track 9)
- Joey Jordison – mixing (tracks 1–5), additional vocal production (track 9)
- Andy Wallace – mixing (tracks 6–8)
- Terry Date – mixing (track 9), remixing (track 15)
- Colin Richardson – mixing (track 10–11, 16–17, 19)
- Chris Lord-Alge – mixing (track 18)
- Corey Taylor – additional vocal production (track 9)

== Charts ==
=== Weekly charts ===
Chart (2012)	Peak position
Australian Albums (ARIA)	16
Austrian Albums (Ö3 Austria)	10
Belgian Albums (Ultratop Flanders)	32
Belgian Albums (Ultratop Wallonia)	43
Canadian Albums (Billboard)	22
Dutch Albums (Album Top 100)	79
Finnish Albums (Suomen virallinen lista)	13
French Albums (SNEP)	86
German Albums (Offzielle Top 100)	10
Irish Albums (IRMA)	44
Italian Albums (FIMI)	27
Japanese Albums (Oricon)	10
Japanese Top Album Sales (Billboard)	9
New Zealand Albums (RMNZ)	24
Scottish Albums (OCC)	25
Spanish Albums (PROMUSICAE)	63
Swedish Albums (Sverigetopplistan)	13
Swiss Albums (Schweizer Hitparade)	23
UK Albums (OCC)	22
UK Rock & Metal Albums (OCC)	2
US Billboard 200	18
US Top Rock Albums (Billboard)	4
US Top Hard Rock Albums (Billboard)	2

=== Year-end charts ===
Chart (2012)	Position
US Top Hard Rock Albums (Billboard)	33

== Certifications ==
Region	Certification	Certified units/sales
New Zealand (RMNZ)	Gold	7,500^{‡}
United Kingdom (BPI)	Platinum	300,000^{‡}
^{‡} Sales+streaming figures based on certification alone.
