= Live at MSG =

Live album by Slipknot
- Released: August 18, 2023
- Recorded: February 5, 2009
- Venue: Madison Square Garden (New York City)
- Genre: Alternative metal
- Length: 77:30
- Label: Roadrunner

Slipknot chronology
Adderall (2023)	Live at MSG (2023)

Professional ratings
Review scores
Source	Rating
Blabbermouth.net	9/10
Classic Rock	4/5 stars

Live at MSG is the third live album by American heavy metal band Slipknot, released on August 18, 2023, by Roadrunner Records. It documents the band's performance at Madison Square Garden on February 5, 2009, during the All Hope Is Gone World Tour. The album's release is intended to commemorate the 15th anniversary of All Hope Is Gone. It was previously included on digital and CD for the 10th anniversary of All Hope Is Gone, but this is the first time it is made available on vinyl.

== Track listing ==
All tracks are written by Slipknot. (Note: Jim Root did not receive writing credits for songs from the band's self-titled album.)

Live at MSG track listing
No.	Title	Original album	Length
1.	"(sic)"	Slipknot	3:55
2.	"Eyeless"	Slipknot	4:15
3.	"Wait and Bleed"	Slipknot	2:44
4.	"Get This"	Slipknot	4:28
5.	"Before I Forget"	Vol. 3: (The Subliminal Verses)	4:22
6.	"The Blister Exists"	Vol. 3: (The Subliminal Verses)	6:37
7.	"Dead Memories"	All Hope Is Gone	4:03
8.	"Left Behind"	Iowa	3:28
9.	"Disasterpiece"	Iowa	5:09
10.	"Purity"	Slipknot	6:26
11.	"Everything Ends"	Iowa	4:22
12.	"Psychosocial"	All Hope Is Gone	5:41
13.	"Duality"	Vol. 3: (The Subliminal Verses)	5:26
14.	"People = Shit"	Iowa	4:10
15.	"Surfacing"	Slipknot	4:49
16.	"Spit It Out"	Slipknot	7:35
Total length:			77:30

== Personnel ==
Personnel taken form Live at MSG album liner notes.

Aside from their real names, members of the band are referred to by numbers zero through eight.

Slipknot

- (#8) Corey Taylor – vocals
- (#7) Mick Thomson – guitar
- (#6) M. Shawn "Clown" Crahan – percussion, art direction
- (#5) Craig Jones – keyboards
- (#4) Jim Root – guitar
- (#3) Chris Fehn – percussion
- (#2) Paul Gray – bass
- (#1) Joey Jordison – drums
- (#0) Sid Wilson – turntables, keyboards

Additional personnel

- Dave "Shirt" Nicholls – recording
- Greg Fidelman – mixing
- Ted Jensen – mastering
- Virgilio Tzaj – design

== Charts ==
Chart performance for Live at MSG
Chart (2023)	Peak position
Scottish Albums (OCC)	81
UK Rock & Metal Albums (OCC)	19
US Top Album Sales (Billboard)	77
US Top Current Album Sales (Billboard)	52
