= Crime Scene (website) =

Website presenting fictional crime stories

Crime Scene is a website that presents fictional crime stories that are told through realistic case documents which can be investigated by the public. It was started in 1995 by Tom Arriola, an experimental theater director in Oxford, Mississippi, and was one of the earliest examples of an alternate reality game, internet hoax, or superfiction. Early on it received some criticism from viewers who, after having believed it to be part of a real murder investigation, discovered that it was actually a work of fiction.

== Content ==
Crime Scene tells stories through the use of false documents, a literary technique whereby invented documents and/or artifacts are presented as real. In this way, an author tries to create a strong enough sense of authenticity that the audience goes beyond the typical suspension of disbelief that one expects to maintain when engaging with a work of fiction. Unlike in many stories, however, false documents are the primary vehicle through which Crime Scene stories are told, rather than as accompaniment to a central written narrative.

Case documents can include interviews, evidence inventories, location sketches, biographies, press articles, forensic reports, anything that would normally be collected by detectives during an investigation. These documents are written and produced by Crime Scene staff and released serially. Viewers can discuss their ideas and offer theories by commenting in discussion areas, posting on their community profile page, and messaging other members directly. There is also an area where subscribers can "ask the detective" questions and receive a response from Crime Scene staff, who respond "in character" (i.e. as a real life detective working on the case). This format differentiates Crime Scene stories from other kinds of fiction, because "while readers of most paperback mystery stories are led down a single plot line, Crime Scene readers actively create a story line and participate in solving cases...".

The interactive nature of Crime Scene plays an integral part of the experience. Oftentimes, the audience's input influences what happens in the story. This was especially true when Crime Scene was first getting started and helped to shape the way that the site developed over time. As Arriola explained in an interview with Web Review in 1995:

This turned out to be much more interactive than anybody knows. When we made up this thing, we just "killed" some girl on my kitchen floor, photographed it, and put it up on the Web. We didn't really think through all the details of the crime... But what happened was that people wrote in letters saying, "Here's what I think could have happened," or "Here's why I think this looks like it does." And what they did was answer questions that I hadn't answered myself yet. People formed the story by giving me leads, offering information, and posing questions...So it worked more like a crime scene really does work. We set up information, and people helped us move in the right direction.

In addition to producing case documents, Crime Scene hires actors to play the parts of central characters. A "crime scene" is constructed and pictures of the "body" are taken and presented as crime scene photos. Sometimes all or part of an interview with a suspect or witness will be filmed and released along with the transcript of the interview. Actors can also play other roles such as television news anchors that report on the cases.

The site also has a web store that sells crime scene supplies, something which has garnered its own share of controversy over the years, with some people complaining that there isn't any reason why members of the public should have access to things such as body bags. Less controversially, the site also sells forensic science kits and "boxed crime scenes" for use in classrooms.

=== Fact vs. Fiction ===
The Crime Scene universe is very much interwoven with the real world and since its inception, the lines between the fictional story world and the real world were intentionally blurry. When the website went up in 1995, the site's creator identified himself as Detective Ted Armstrong from the Oxford Police Department. He explained that he was looking for help solving the murder of a young woman. However, the intention wasn't to create a hoax. Whereas a hoax aims to deceive people as its end goal, Crime Scene uses deception as a way to make the story more immersive and to give people a sense of being part of a real life mystery. This kind of storytelling, still somewhat undefined even today, was very uncommon in 1995 before the internet became ubiquitous. Arriola explains,

“I'm trying to come up with a name for this kind of entertainment, which pretends to be real – maybe this is 'faction'. It represents itself as fact, it's as factual as it can be, but it's fiction. I want to make people think this is real, at first. Then they have to do a little work to find out that it's not."

Over the years, other kinds of entertainment have emerged giving more definition to what Arriola refers to as "faction", notably alternate reality games (ARGs). In most ARGs, the game itself never refers to itself as a game or admits that it is a work of fiction. In the ARG community, this is known as the "This Is Not A Game (TINAG)" principle. This principle is a call for the willful suspension of disbelief beyond the traditional boundaries of a story for the sake of a more immersive experience. Although the Crime Scene website no longer maintains the TINAG principle absolutely, (explaining in the FAQ section that the cases are works of fiction), it still tells stories as if they were real criminal cases. In fact, many visitors to the site still question its authenticity and express uncertainty as to whether or not it's real.

Crime Scene also spreads the stories out, not only into the real world but also across the internet and into other formats. In that stories are spread across different mediums, Crime Scene also finds a kinship with transmedia storytelling. For example, observant viewers might notice a website mentioned in a case document, such as a suspect's business website or the website for the fictional newspaper, The Oxford Weekly Planet. If they tried to go to the website they would find that it actually exists and appears to be authentic (i.e. produced by someone within the story world). However, in reality, these sites were created by Crime Scene staff. Another example is an e-book that was published in 2014 titled "Purity Knight: A Diary" which contains the diary of one of Crime Scene's fictional victims.

In Hamlet on the Holodeck: The Future of Narrative in Cyberspace, Janet Murray discusses the Crime Scene website as an example of storytelling innovations in the early days of the internet, citing how it allows viewers to weave between fact and fiction and at times "leap out of the story altogether and find [themselves] in the 'real' world". All of the stories presented on Crime Scene take place in the real world town of Oxford, Mississippi, and locations are closely mapped to real life places. In the early days of Crime Scene, almost every place or entity mentioned in the case documents were real. In fact, the first case published on the website used the real names, driver's licenses (with registration numbers scratched out), and other personal details of the actors portraying the characters.

The one major difference between Crime Scene's Oxford and the real Oxford in Lafayette County, Mississippi is that Crime Scene's Oxford is located in Yoknapatawpha County, the fictionalized municipality made famous by the writer William Faulkner. Faulkner situated his stories in Oxford and based locations and characters off of those he knew of in his real life. But he created Yoknapatawpha County to serve as the mythical story world in which his characters lived. Similarly, Crime Scene uses Yoknapatawpha County as the story world but keeps Oxford as the base between the story world and the real world.

The way in which Crime Scene blurs the line between fiction and reality is somewhat akin to, or perhaps the inverse of, what is referred to as breaking the fourth wall. However, as Stephen Conway explains in an article on Gamasutra; in games, what is commonly cited as a break in the fourth wall is better described as an expansion of the magic circle, the space in which the fictional game world exists and is separate from the real world. When the magic circle is expanded, elements outside of the game, such as websites, maps, or real world locations, are suddenly made into game pieces. Crime Scene expands the magic circle in just such a way, by making the game spill over into the real world so that viewers are unsure where the game ends and reality begins.

== History ==
When the site launched in 1995 it consisted of only the original "Crime Scene Evidence File" which contained photos and evidence pertaining to the fictional murder of a real life friend of Tom Arriola. The site was originally located at the University of Mississippi at the (now defunct) address: http://www.quest.net/crime/crime.html. That initial case lasted nearly two years, over which time the website attracted attention within the growing community of internet enthusiasts and early adopters, such as the online technology magazine Web Review. Crime Scene was also recognized by Cool Site of the Day, the so-called "arbiter of taste on the Internet" in the 1990s, winning the title in July 1995 and October 2001.

Arriola got the idea for Crime Scene when he was working for the mystery novelist John Grisham. He also cited the internet's first webcam, the Trojan Room coffee pot as inspiration, saying

"I realized that there was something more to the Web than a bunch of data; you can do more than just search for keywords. You can go there, live. It's more entertaining, more theatrical than people think. It has some qualities that are better than theater: in a theater, you sit and watch; on the Internet you're more active: you can go there and participate in an active way.”

Five years later, Arriola discussed his vision with CNN, saying “My intent was to create a new form of theater, theater that had a new proscenium, and that would be the computer monitor...In my mind, this is the new theater of the future and the actors will be performing for the computer screen more than for the stage.”

=== Controversies ===
==== Hoax ====
The controversy that led to the website's initial notoriety was very much influenced by the historical context of the mid-1990s. As Arriola explained in a television interview in 1999, "The internet in 1995... [didn’t have] any entertainment websites and so anything that you went to at that time was probably put together by a scientist or a college student and it was, for all intents and purposes, a bunch of facts."

The pragmatic nature of the early internet coupled with the website's own verisimilitude made it easy for the site's visitors to believe in its legitimacy. Additionally, there was no disclaimer anywhere on the website at the time that indicated that the crime was fictitious. So when Crime Scene was featured by the internet service Prodigy in its daily lineup, with a description noting that it featured "a real murder investigation", controversy ensued.

The increased publicity led to more visitors, and some of them began to question whether or not the investigation was real. One of the site's viewers called Prodigy's customer service line on two separate occasions and was reassured both times that the investigation was authentic. Then they called the real-life Oxford Police Department and the local newspaper, The Oxford Eagle, which was also named in the case documents, only to find out that nobody had any knowledge of the investigation.

When word got out that it was all a work of fiction, many viewers were upset and they contacted local authorities and media to seek a resolution. Some viewers complained of being "ripped-off" because they were paying Prodigy's service charge of $16 an hour for internet access and they spent hours poring through the case documents. When law enforcement in Oxford caught wind of what was going on they considered whether or not they could bring charges against Arriola. But as explained by Kathleen Flinn in an article detailing the controversy, "What would they charge him with, anyway? Impersonating an officer? Fraud? Filing a "false" report? In the end, they decided he had not really broken any laws".

Responding to the criticism in an interview with the aforementioned Oxford Eagle, Arriola said, "'I used to feel bad that I tricked these people and made them upset...This reminds me of when realism hit the theaters; no one knew how to react. But rules for these sort of things are not made yet. We're still teaching people the conventions of how to behave in the theater of the Web.'"

==== Legal Dispute ====
In 1999, the metal band Slipknot released their debut album with a song that was inspired by and named after the victim in one of Crime Scene's earliest cases, Purity Knight. Like many visitors to the website, the band's lead singer, Corey Taylor, believed that the story was true, saying "I still think the story's real. It fucked our whole world up when we read it. Can you imagine a girl being buried in a box and have all this lecherous bullshit drip down on her from this guy? It just hurts your head."

The story was about a University of Mississippi student that was buried in a box underground and kept alive for days. The band also sampled audio clips from the Crime Scene website of Purity telling a story to a little boy who had discovered her in the box in the woods and recorded her. The audio was sampled in the prelude to "Purity", which was titled "Frail Limb Nursery". When Crime Scene made allegations of copyright infringement, the band removed and replaced the two offending tracks and re-released the album in order to avoid a lawsuit. While the prelude "Frail Limb Nursery" was never re-released, "Purity" was included in the band's second DVD, Disasterpieces as well as the live album 9.0: Live, Antennas to Hell, and the 10th- and 25th-anniversary editions of the self-titled album.

== See also ==
- Crime fiction
- Digital storytelling
- Dracula
- History of the internet
- Interactive fiction
- Interactive theater
- Mystery dinner
- New media
- Pervasive game
- The Mysterious Package Company
- The War of the Worlds
