= My Plague =

- 2002 cover of the new abuse mix for Resident Evil

Single by Slipknot

from the album Iowa and Resident Evil
- Released: July 8, 2002
- Genre: Nu metal
- Length: 3:40 (album version); 2:59 (New Abuse mix)
- Label: Roadrunner
- Songwriters: Corey Taylor; Mick Thomson; Jim Root; Paul Gray; Joey Jordison; Shawn "Clown" Crahan; Chris Fehn; Sid Wilson; Craig "133" Jones
- Producers: Ross Robinson; Slipknot

Slipknot singles chronology
"Left Behind" (2001)	"My Plague" (2002)	"Duality" (2004)

Music video
- "My Plague" on YouTube

"My Plague" is a song by American heavy metal band Slipknot. Produced by Ross Robinson and the band, it was featured on the band's second studio album, Iowa (2001), and released as the second single from the album on July 8, 2002. The single version is a remix by Terry Date known as the "New Abuse mix", which was produced for the soundtrack to the film Resident Evil. The song reached number 43 on the UK Singles Chart and was nominated for the Grammy Award for Best Metal Performance in 2003.

== Composition and lyrics ==
"Sid [Wilson, DJ] came up with this great beat, so we tried to come up with riffs around it. The last thing we added was that chorus… We got Grammy nominations for 'My Plague' and 'Left Behind', which was pretty weird. People were telling me it was a big deal. I was like, 'Is it?' If the people that nominated us had ever seen us, they would have run a mile." – Corey Taylor

"My Plague" is one of the more melodic songs on Iowa, while still featuring many heavier elements. For Billboard, Eric Aiese described it as "catchy enough to pick up some spins at rock radio", noting that it features both "intimidating" and "melodic" vocals. British music magazine Kerrang! highlighted it as an "immensely heavy track but ... with an incredibly catchy and melodic chorus amid the sick riffs and thunderous percussion." Metal Hammer writer Luke Morton claimed the track is "one of Iowa's more accessible songs due to the clean vocals"; adding, "it stills carries that threatening edge like the rest of the record". Victoria Segal of the NME called the song "filthy noise", while E! Online's review of Iowa describes it as "surprisingly melodic". Rolling Stone identified "My Plague" as an example of the "opposition" of "emotional negativity" and "perversely hook-heavy writing" on the album.

== Promotion and release ==
In January 2002, it was announced that a reworked version of "My Plague" dubbed the "New Abuse mix" would be featured on the Resident Evil soundtrack and released as a single in February. The track was remixed by Terry Date and features "cleaner vocals and some minor arrangement shifts", according to Blabbermouth.net. Speaking about the song's "New Abuse mix", Slipknot bassist Paul Gray explained that "On the album version there were some kind of weird vocal effects on some of the parts, and we took them out and just had Corey [Taylor] sing", adding that a section of the song had to be removed in order to make it suitable for radio airplay. The single release was later delayed to July 8, with live recordings of "The Heretic Anthem" and "(sic)" from a show in Stockholm, Sweden on January 22 featured as B-sides.

== Music video ==
The music video for "My Plague" is made up of a combination of clips from Resident Evil and footage from the band's performance at London Arena on February 16, 2002, the entirety of which was later featured on the band's second video album Disasterpieces released in November. The live concert footage was directed by Matthew Amos and the film was directed by Paul Anderson, however Amos and editor Simon Hilton are credited as the video's directors. Hilton claims that he edited the video while wearing a Slipknot mask. The video was featured on the "My Plague" single, as well as on the Disasterpieces album later in the year. The "My Plague" music video was nominated for Best Video at the 2002 Kerrang! Awards alongside "Tainted Love" by Marilyn Manson, "Tribute" by Tenacious D, "In the End" by Linkin Park and "The One" by Foo Fighters. The award was won by "Tainted Love".

== Critical reception ==
"My Plague" received mixed reviews from critics. Tom Dunne of Hot Press magazine hailed the song as "stupid, staged, ridiculous and laughably over the top", which he claimed made it "essential listening". Playlouder writer William Ruff and Dotmusic writer John Mulvey both praised the song's lyric "You fucking touch me I will rip you apart/I'll reach in and take a bite out of that shit you call a heart", however this line was criticised by Tom Sinclair of Entertainment Weekly as uninventive. Louis Pattison of the NME complained that "you can spot a Slipknot single a mile off: they're the very average ones that feature big, echoing stadium-goth vocals, rather than the sound of a man screaming so loud that his gall bladder evacuates his body through the mouth", describing the track as "Not, let's be fair, primest 'Knot material".

In a retrospective feature published in 2016, Luke Morton of Metal Hammer ranked "My Plague" as the fourth best track on Iowa, praising it as "a masterclass in writing emotional, pissed off metal that can still get on the radio". In January 2003, "My Plague" was nominated for the Grammy Award for Best Metal Performance at the 45th Annual Grammy Awards, alongside "Here to Stay" by Korn, "Portrait" by P.O.D., "Get Inside" by Corey Taylor's second band Stone Sour and "Never Gonna Stop (The Red, Red Kroovy)" by Rob Zombie. The award was won by "Here to Stay".

== Track listing ==
EU/JP CD single

All tracks are written by Slipknot.

No.	Title	Length
1.	"My Plague" (New Abuse mix)	3:05
2.	"The Heretic Anthem" (live)	3:45
3.	"(sic)" (live)	3:41
Total length:		10:30

- include music video "My Plague" (New Abuse mix)

US/EU Promo CD

No.	Title	Length
1.	"My Plague" (New Abuse mix)	2:51

== Charts ==
Chart performance for "My Plague"
Chart (2002)	Peak position
Scotland Singles (OCC)	41
UK Singles (OCC)	43
