= People = Shit =

Promotional single by Slipknot

from the album Iowa
- Released: June 23, 2002
- Recorded: January 17–March 16, 2001
- Studio: Sound City Studios (Van Nuys, California)
- Genre: Nu metal groove metal, death metal
- Length: 3:35
- Label: Roadrunner
- Producer: Ross Robinson

Slipknot singles chronology
"Left Behind" (2001)	"People = Shit" (2002)	"My Plague" (2002)

"People = Shit" is a song by American heavy metal band Slipknot. It was released as a promotional single in June 23, 2002, on their second studio album, Iowa. It is known as one of the most heaviest songs from the band with Death metal influences featuring rapid Blast beats and aggressive Growl vocals.

A live performance video can be found on their second DVD, Disasterpieces.

== Composition ==
Since its release, the song has been performed at all of the band's concerts. It has been described as one of the band's darkest, heaviest, and most aggressive songs. It features a simple, repetitive, but very heavy riff, along with extensive electronic elements and a drum solo in the middle of the song.

== Reception ==
According to The Pit, the song silenced critics who considered Slipknot a rap rock band. Instead, the band presented a mixture of death metal, sludge, and noise rock, overshadowing the electronics and samples. Kerrang! considered the song to have eliminated any questions about the band becoming more "pop-oriented" on their second album. MMH described the track as having "an 'fuck everything' attitude, insane vocals and a furious rhythm", concluding that "People = Shit" is definitely a band anthem.

== Musical style ==
Along with the songs "Disasterpiece" and "The Heretic Anthem", "People = Shit" is heavily influenced by death metal.
