= Welcome to Our Neighborhood =

Video by Slipknot
- Released: November 9, 1999
- Recorded: 1999
- Genre: Nu metal
- Length: 19:38 (VHS); 28:02 (DVD)
- Label: Roadrunner
- Director: Thomas Mignone
- Producer: Darci Oltman; Marc Stecker

Slipknot chronology
Welcome to Our Neighborhood (1999)	Disasterpieces (2002)

Welcome to Our Neighborhood is the first video album by American heavy metal band Slipknot. It was released on November 9, 1999, by Roadrunner Records and later reissued in DVD format on November 18, 2003. Characterized as a band's home video, it features a mixture of live performances footage of the songs "Surfacing", "Wait and Bleed", and "Scissors", interviews, and music video of "Spit It Out". Additional concept imagery and interview footage is included on the film, while the DVD version features more bonus material. The video was well received by fans and entered number one on the Billboard Top Music Videos chart, and was certified platinum in February 2000.

== Production and release ==
Following the band's highly successful breakthrough 1999 tour on Ozzfest, Slipknot decided to produce Welcome to Our Neighborhood with Doom Films Production. The video was directed by Thomas Mignone, and released on VHS through Roadrunner Records on November 9, 1999. It features the bands' earliest videos: live performances of "Surfacing" and "Wait and Bleed", and the "banned from MTV" video clip of "Spit It Out" — all tracks from the band's self-titled debut were released earlier that year. It also features additional concept imagery and interview footage with lead singer Corey Taylor, guitarist Mick Thomson and percussionist Shawn Crahan, to a total of 20 minutes of video.

The publisher, Roadrunner Records, promotes the video as "a study in the roots of Slipknot" as a response to fans wanting to see what made the band "tick". In the video, band members explain about the release that "basically [it's] nine people working out every poison that ever affected them in their life and putting it on tape."

A DVD version was released on November 18, 2003, and features bonus material of the band performing "Scissors", behind-the-scenes material, and home footage filmed by the band in their hometown of Des Moines, Iowa. The seven minutes-long concert footage of the track "Scissors" was filmed during the band's appearance at Ozzfest 1999, but has the studio version dubbed over.

== Reception ==
Professional ratings
Review scores
Source	Rating
Allmusic	3/5 stars

The video was well received by fans and entered number one on the Billboard Top Music Videos chart, where it remained in the charts for 54 weeks. In the Billboard Top VHS Sales chart, the video peaked at number four, and remained in for 45 weeks. The video was certified gold by RIAA on December 21, 1999, and platinum on February 16, 2000. In Canada, it sold over 50,000 units, and thus, it was certified gold on February 1, 2000. On allmovie.com, the video was described as "killer" and having a sound "as disturbing as the horrific masks they don to hide their true identities". The video remains unrated in the US, while in the UK it received a 15 BBFC age certification.

== Contents ==
Videography

- "Surfacing" (live)
- "Spit It Out" (music video)
- "Wait and Bleed" (live)
- "Scissors" (DVD only, live)
  - Thomas Mignone directed all the live footage for the video, but did not direct the outside clips, where the band members are banging on barrels and starting fires, it is unknown whether these clips are from an unreleased music video or not.
- "Eeyore"

Other content

- Conceptual images
- Interview footage
- Band's home video footage
- Over 20 minutes of exclusive video footage (DVD only)

== Personnel ==
Aside from their real names, members of the band are referred to by numbers zero through eight.

Slipknot

- (#0) Sid Wilson – turntables
- (#1) Joey Jordison – drums, mixing
- (#2) Paul Gray – bass
- (#3) Chris Fehn – percussion, backing vocals
- (#4) Jim Root – guitars
- (#5) Craig Jones – samples, media
- (#6) Michael Shawn Crahan – percussion, backing vocals, editing
- (#7) Mick Thomson – guitars
- (#8) Corey Taylor – vocals

Production team

- Thomas Mignone – director, camera, conceptual imagery
- Darci Oltman – producer
- L.E.G. Productions – interview footage
- Stefan Seskis – camera, photography
- Bobby Tongs – camera
- Brendan Sherman – camera
- Fred Salkind – DVD creative director
- Marc Stecker – DVD producer, project manager
- Stephanie Masarsky – DVD executive producer
- Doug Banker – management
- t42design – package design
- Dean Karr – photography

== Charts ==
Chart (1999)	Peak position
Billboard Top Music Videos	1

== Certifications ==
Region	Certification	Certified units/sales
Australia (ARIA)	2× Platinum	30,000^{^}
United States (RIAA)	Platinum	100,000^{^}
^{^} Shipments figures based on certification alone.

== Release history ==
Region	Date	Label	Format	Catalog
Worldwide release	November 9, 1999	Roadrunner	VHS	RRV 0981–3
Worldwide release	November 23, 2003	Roadrunner	DVD	DVD 0956–9
