= Iowa World Tour =

2001–2002 concert tour by Slipknot

- World tour by Slipknot
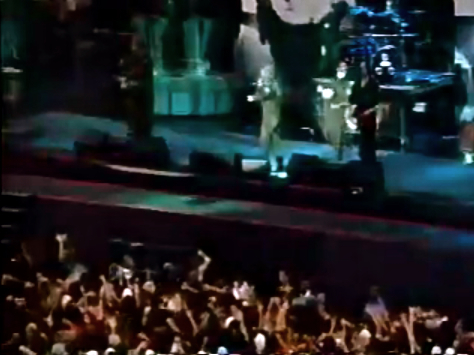
- Slipknot performing at Summer Sonic during the Iowa World Tour
- Associated album: Iowa
- Start date: May 17, 2001
- End date: August 29, 2002
- Legs: 6
- No. of shows: 109

Slipknot concert chronology
- Tattoo the Earth (2000–2002); Iowa World Tour (2001–2002) Ozzfest Tour (2001); The Subliminal Verses World Tour (2004–2005)

Iowa World Tour was a worldwide concert tour in 2001 and 2002 headlined by Slipknot in support of their second studio album Iowa.

== Set list ==
=== Kill the Industry ===
1. "(515)"
2. "People = Shit"
3. "Liberate"
4. "Get This" (May 25)
5. "Eeyore"
6. "Disasterpiece"
7. "Purity"
8. "Gently"
9. "Turntables Solo" (May 17, 20, 21, 22, 24, 26, 29)
10. "Eyeless"
11. "Everything Ends" (May 20)
12. "New Abortion"
13. "The Heretic Anthem"
14. "Spit It Out"
15. "Wait and Bleed"
16. "742617000027"
17. "(sic)"
18. "Surfacing"

=== Ozzfest 2001 ===
1. "(515)"
2. "People = Shit"
3. "Liberate"
4. "Get This" (Jul 30)
5. "Eeyore"
6. "Disasterpiece"
7. "Purity"
8. "Gently" (Jul 30) / "Get This" (Aug 7)
9. "Eyeless"
10. "New Abortion"
11. "The Heretic Anthem" (from Jun 9)
12. "Spit It Out"
13. "Wait and Bleed"
14. "742617000027"
15. "(sic)"
16. "Surfacing"

=== Ozzfest Off-dates ===
1. "(515)"
2. "People = Shit"
3. "Liberate"
4. "Get This" (Jul 15)
5. "Eeyore"
6. "Disasterpiece"
7. "Purity"
8. "Gently"
9. "Turntables Solo"
10. "Eyeless"
11. "Iowa" / "Drum Solo" (Jun 15)
12. "New Abortion"
13. "The Heretic Anthem"
14. "Spit It Out"
15. "Wait and Bleed"
16. "742617000027"
17. "(sic)"
18. "Surfacing"

=== Pledge of Allegiance ===
1. "(515)"
2. "People = Shit"
3. "Liberate"
4. "Get This"
5. "Eeyore" (Oct 9)
6. "Disasterpiece"
7. "Purity"
8. "Gently"
9. "Turntables Solo"
10. "Eyeless"
11. "Iowa" / "Drum Solo"
12. "New Abortion"
13. "The Heretic Anthem"
14. "Spit It Out"
15. "Wait and Bleed"
16. "742617000027"
17. "(sic)"
18. "Surfacing"

=== European Iowa Tour 2K2 ===
1. "(515)"
2. "People = Shit"
3. "Liberate"
4. "Left Behind"
5. "Eeyore"
6. "Disasterpiece"
7. "Purity"
8. "Gently"
9. "Turntables Solo"
10. "Eyeless"
11. "Iowa" / "Drum Solo"
12. "New Abortion" (dropped in Feb 10) / "My Plague" (from Feb 11 onwards)
13. "New Abortion" (only in Feb 16)
14. "The Heretic Anthem"
15. "Spit It Out"
16. "Wait and Bleed"
17. "742617000027"
18. "(sic)"
19. "Surfacing"

Note

Hamburg's concert was scheduled to be at Alsterdorfer Sporthalle but was moved to the Docks at the day of the concert due to poor ticket sales. The band's set was much shorter than usual (45 minutes) due to their technical equipment being designed for a huge hall, only performing a 30-minute impromptu "Iowa" version, "People = Shit", "Disasterpiece", "Eeyore", "The Heretic Anthem", "Wait and Bleed", "(sic)" and "Surfacing";

=== Japanese Iowa Tour 2K2 ===
1. "(515)"
2. "People = Shit"
3. "Liberate"
4. "Left Behind"
5. "Eeyore"
6. "Disasterpiece"
7. "Purity"
8. "Gently"
9. "Turntables Solo"
10. "Eyeless"
11. "Iowa" / "Drum Solo"
12. "My Plague" (Mar 18, 19, 21, 23, 26, 27) / "New Abortion" (Mar 20, 24)
13. "The Heretic Anthem"
14. "Spit It Out"
15. "Wait and Bleed"
16. "742617000027"
17. "(sic)"
18. "Surfacing"

=== European Festivals 2002 ===
1. "(515)"
2. "People = Shit"
3. "Liberate"
4. "Left Behind"
5. "Eeyore"
6. "Disasterpiece"
7. "Purity"
8. "Get This" (except Aug 25, 27)
9. "Eyeless"
10. "My Plague"
11. "The Heretic Anthem"
12. "Spit It Out"
13. "Wait and Bleed"
14. "742617000027"
15. "(sic)"
16. "Surfacing"

== Kill the Industry ==
Kill the Industry was a leg of the Iowa World Tour in Europe. Musicians that accompanied the tour include Static-X (except Portugal and Spain), Mudvayne, Amen and Raging Speedhorn. The band was supposed to play at Dynamo Open Air, but the festival was cancelled. As a result, this date was replaced by an headlining show in 's-Hertogenbosch with some bands supposed to play at Dynamo that day opening. However, the band also cancelled their appearance at Rock am Ring and Rock im Park.

Date	City	Country	Venue
May 17, 2001	Lisbon	Portugal	Pavilhão Atlântico
May 18, 2001	Madrid	Spain	Festimad
May 20, 2001	Milan	Italy	Palavobis
May 21, 2001	Zürich	Switzerland	Volkshaus
May 22, 2001	Munich	Germany	Colosseum
May 24, 2001	Torhout	Belgium	Earect Festival
May 25, 2001	~~Lichtenvoorde~~	Netherlands	~~Dynamo Open Air~~
May 25, 2001	's-Hertogenbosch	Netherlands	Maaspoort
May 26, 2001	Milton Keynes	United Kingdom	Ozzfest
May 28, 2001	Oberhausen	Germany	Turbinenhalle
May 29, 2001	Paris	France	Zénith de Paris
May 31, 2001	Bremen	Germany	Pier 2
June 1, 2001	~~Nuremberg~~	Germany	~~Rock im Park~~
June 2, 2001	Vienna	Austria	Libro Music Hall
June 3, 2001	~~Nürburgring~~	~~Germany~~	~~Rock am Ring~~

== Ozzfest 2001 ==
Slipknot joined the 2001 Ozzfest, performing on the main stage after Papa Roach and before Marilyn Manson.

Date	City	Country	Venue
June 8, 2001	Tinley Park	United States	Tweeter Center
June 9, 2001	East Troy	United States	Alpine Valley Music Theatre
June 10, 2001	Springfield	United States	Price Cutter Park (Off-date)
June 12, 2001	Noblesville	United States	Verizon Wireless Music Center
June 15, 2001	Moline	United States	MARK of the Quad Cities (Off-date)
June 16, 2001	Somerset	United States	Float Rite Park Amphitheatre
June 18, 2001	Maryland Heights	United States	Riverport Amphitheatre
June 19, 2001	Bonner Springs	United States	Sandstone Amphitheater
June 21, 2001	Denver	United States	Mile High Stadium
June 25, 2001	George	United States	The Gorge Amphitheatre
June 27, 2001	Marysville	United States	Sacramento Valley Amphitheatre
June 29, 2001	Mountain View	United States	Shoreline Amphitheatre
June 30, 2001	San Bernardino	United States	Blockbuster Pavilion
July 1, 2001	Phoenix	United States	Cricket Pavilion (Off-date)
July 3, 2001	Selma	United States	Verizon Wireless Amphitheater
July 4, 2001	Lubbock	United States	Canyon Amphitheatre (Off-date)
July 5, 2001	Dallas	United States	Smirnoff Music Center
July 6, 2001	Antioch	United States	AmSouth Amphitheater (Off-date)
July 7, 2001	Atlanta	United States	HiFi Buys Amphitheatre
July 9, 2001	Camden	United States	Tweeter Center at the Waterfront
July 10, 2001	North Myrtle Beach	United States	House of Blues (Off-date)
July 11, 2001	Lake Buena Vista	United States	House of Blues (Off-date)
July 13, 2001	West Palm Beach	United States	Mars Music Amphitheatre
July 14, 2001	St. Petersburg	United States	Tropicana Field
July 15, 2001	Biloxi	United States	Mississippi Coast Coliseum (Off-date)
July 17, 2001	Charlotte	United States	Verizon Wireless Amphitheatre
July 19, 2001	Virginia Beach	United States	GTE Amphitheatre (Off-date)
July 20, 2001	Bristow	United States	Nissan Pavilion
July 21, 2001	Camden	United States	Tweeter Center at the Waterfront
July 22, 2001	Manchester	United States	Singer Park (Off-date)
July 24, 2001	Toronto	Canada	The Docks
July 25, 2001	Rochester	United States	Blue Cross Arena (Off-date)
July 26, 2001	Cuyahoga Falls	United States	Blossom Music Center
July 28, 2001	Burgettstown	United States	Post-Gazette Pavilion
July 30, 2001	Clarkston	United States	DTE Energy Music Theatre
July 31, 2001	Clarkston	United States	DTE Energy Music Theatre
August 3, 2001	Columbus	United States	Polaris Amphitheater
August 5, 2001	Hartford	United States	Meadows Music Theatre
~~August 6, 2001~~	~~Portland~~	United States	~~Cumberland County Civic Center (Off-date)~~ CANCELLED
August 7, 2001	Mansfield	United States	Tweeter Center
August 8, 2001	Mansfield	United States	Tweeter Center
August 9, 2001	Wantagh	United States	Jones Beach Theater (Off-date)
August 11, 2001	Holmdel Township	United States	PNC Bank Arts Center
August 12, 2001	Holmdel Township	United States	PNC Bank Arts Center

== Pledge of Allegiance ==
The Pledge of Allegiance Tour was a leg co-headlined by the heavy metal band System of a Down. Both groups used the tour as a promotion for their new albums.

The band played 27 shows all over the United States and had support from Rammstein, American Head Charge, Mudvayne and No One. The tour was scheduled to start on September 14 but was postponed for a week due to the terrorist attacks on September 11, 2001, 5 dates were rescheduled and 4 dates were cancelled, the rest of the dates went ahead as originally scheduled.

Originally, No One were to open the tour and American Head Charge was to take their set for the second half of the tour. Due to the terrorist attacks, Mudvayne dropped off the tour leaving an open set on October 2. To fill the gap, American Head Charge came onto the tour early and No One stayed on for the entire tour.

A Pledge of Allegiance CD, reported by Metal Hammer to have been largely recorded at the Rosemont date in October, includes SOAD's 'Chop Suey!', 'Bounce' and 'Toxicity', Slipknot's 'People = Shit', 'The Heretic Anthem' and 'New Abortion', Mudvayne's 'Under My Skin' and 'Pharmaecopia', American Head Charge's 'Seamless' and No One's 'My Release'. However, complained Malcolm Dome, "Mudvayne's two tracks… are taken from their DVD L(ive) D(osage) 50: Live in Peoria. And, for reasons best known to themselves, Rammstein are completely absent. So this is far from being the complete live documentation of the tour many would have hoped and liked to experience on the CD."

Bands:

- System of a Down
- Slipknot
- Rammstein (dropped from the tour on 24th October)
- Mudvayne (dropped from the tour on 30th September for unknown reasons)
- No One
- American Head Charge (started 5th October. dropped from the last show of the tour due to tour with Slayer)

Date	City	Country	Venue
September 14, 2001	Rosemont	United States	~~Allstate Arena~~ (rescheduled)
September 15, 2001	Saint Paul	United States	~~Xcel Energy Center~~ (rescheduled)
September 16, 2001	Omaha	United States	~~Omaha Civic Auditorium~~ (cancelled)
September 18, 2001	Cedar Rapids	United States	~~U.S. Cellular Center~~ (rescheduled)
September 19, 2001	Madison	United States	~~Alliant Energy Center~~ (rescheduled)
September 21, 2001	Denver	United States	Denver Coliseum
September 22, 2001	Colorado Springs	United States	World Arena
September 25, 2001	Portland	United States	Rose Garden
September 26, 2001	Tacoma	United States	Tacoma Dome
September 28, 2001	San Jose	United States	Compaq Center
September 29, 2001	Inglewood	United States	Great Western Forum
September 30, 2001	San Diego	United States	Cox Arena
October 2, 2001	Paradise	United States	Thomas & Mack Center
October 3, 2001	Phoenix	United States	~~America West Arena~~ (cancelled)
October 5, 2001	Oklahoma City	United States	Myriad Convention Center
October 6, 2001	Dallas	United States	Reunion Arena
October 7, 2001	San Antonio	United States	Alamodome
October 9, 2001	Rosemont	United States	Allstate Arena
October 10, 2001	St. Louis	United States	~~Savvis Center~~ (rescheduled)
October 11, 2001	Saint Paul	United States	Xcel Energy Center
October 12, 2001	Madison	United States	Alliant Energy Center
October 12, 2001	Tampa	United States	~~Ice Palace~~ (cancelled)
October 13, 2001	St. Louis	United States	Savvis Center
October 13, 2001	Orlando	United States	~~Orlando Centroplex~~ (cancelled)
October 14, 2001	Cedar Rapids	United States	U.S. Cellular Center
October 14, 2001	Miami	United States	~~Miami Arena~~ (cancelled)
October 16, 2001	Baltimore	United States	Baltimore Arena
October 17, 2001	Philadelphia	United States	First Union Spectrum
October 18, 2001	Wilkes-Barre	United States	First Union Arena (off-date)
October 19, 2001	Hartford	United States	Hartford Civic Center
October 20, 2001	Albany	United States	Pepsi Arena
October 21, 2001	Portland	United States	Cumberland County Civic Center
October 23, 2001	Detroit	United States	Cobo Arena
October 24, 2001	Cleveland	United States	CSU Convocation Center
October 26, 2001	Pittsburgh	United States	Mellon Arena
October 27, 2001	Peoria	United States	Peoria Civic Center
October 28, 2001	Grand Rapids	United States	Van Andel Arena
October 30, 2001	Worcester	United States	The Centrum
October 31, 2001	East Rutherford	United States	Continental Airlines Arena
November 2, 2001	State College	United States	Bryce Jordan Center

== Cancelled headlining US leg ==
The band was supposed to play their own headlining shows after the Pledge of Allegiance Tour, with 40 Below Summer as direct support. However, this portion of the tour ended up being cancelled just nine days after its announcement, due to the wife of the band's percussionist, Shawn Crahan, undergoing surgery for Crohn's disease, which forced Crahan to not participate in Slipknot's live performances. However, the group announced that they plan to go ahead with their upcoming European tour, which had its start date moved ahead to January 2002.

Date	City	Country	Venue
November 21, 2001	Fargo	United States	~~Fargo Civic Center~~ (cancelled)
November 23, 2001	Columbus	United States	~~PromoWest Pavilion~~ (cancelled)
November 24, 2001	Saginaw	United States	~~Wendler Arena~~ (cancelled)
November 25, 2001	Monaca	United States	~~Golden Dome~~ (cancelled)
November 27, 2001	Huntington	United States	~~Huntington Civic Arena~~ (cancelled)
November 28, 2001	Toledo	United States	~~Toledo Sports Arena~~ (cancelled)
November 29, 2001	Fort Wayne	United States	~~Allen County War Memorial Coliseum~~ (cancelled)
November 30, 2001	La Crosse	United States	~~La Crosse Center~~ (cancelled)
December 2, 2001	Sioux Falls	United States	~~Sioux Falls Arena~~ (cancelled)
December 3, 2001	Denver	United States	~~Fillmore Auditorium~~ (cancelled)
December 5, 2001	Valley Center	United States	~~Kansas Coliseum~~ (cancelled)
December 6, 2001	Kansas City	United States	~~Hale Arena~~ (cancelled)
December 7, 2001	Springfield	United States	~~Shrine Mosque Auditorium~~ (cancelled)
December 9, 2001	McAllen	United States	~~Villa Real Convention Center~~ (cancelled)
December 10, 2001	Houston	United States	~~Arena Theatre~~ (cancelled)
December 12, 2001	Pensacola	United States	~~Bayfront Auditorium~~ (cancelled)
December 13, 2001	Tampa	United States	~~USF Special Events Center~~ (cancelled)
December 14, 2001	Orlando	United States	~~House of Blues~~ (cancelled)
December 15, 2001	Sunrise	United States	~~Sunrise Musical Theater~~ (cancelled)
December 17, 2001	Atlanta	United States	~~DeKalb Center for the Performing Arts~~ (cancelled)
December 21, 2001	Clive	United States	~~7 Flags Events Center~~ (cancelled)

== European leg ==
The European Iowa Tour was intended to begin around the September 11 attacks, but because of the incident, the tour was postponed to February 2002.

Slipknot arrived in Helsinki, Finland for a performance on January 20, 2002 to kick off the European Iowa Tour, which was its penultimate leg. On February 16, 2002, Slipknot performed at the London Arena, the show they filmed for their live DVD Disasterpieces, released November 22 of the same year. Despite significant tabloid coverage, the European Iowa Tour was not sold out.

Date	City	Country	Venue
January 20, 2002	Helsinki	Finland	Hartwall Areena
January 22, 2002	Stockholm	Sweden	Hovet
January 24, 2002	Copenhagen	Denmark	Valby-Hallen
January 25, 2002	Berlin	Germany	Arena
January 26, 2002	Essen	Germany	Grugahalle
January 27, 2002	Böblingen	Germany	Sporthalle
January 29, 2002	Hamburg	Germany	Docks
January 30, 2002	Amsterdam	Netherlands	Heineken Music Hall
February 1, 2002	Katowice	Poland	Spodek
February 2, 2002	Prague	Czech Republic	Small Sports Hall
February 4, 2002	Milan	Italy	Alcatraz
February 5, 2002	Winterthur	Switzerland	Eulachhalle
February 7, 2002	Leganés	Spain	La Cubierta
February 8, 2002	San Sebastián	Spain	Indoor Bullring
February 10, 2002	Paris	France	Zénith de Paris
February 11, 2002	Paris	France	Zénith de Paris
February 12, 2002	Leuven	Belgium	Brabanthal
February 14, 2002	Glasgow	Scotland	Scottish Exhibition and Conference Centre
February 15, 2002	Manchester	England	Manchester Evening News Arena
February 16, 2002	London	England	London Arena
February 18, 2002	Brighton	England	Centre
February 19, 2002	Cardiff	Wales	Cardiff International Arena
February 20, 2002	Birmingham	England	National Exhibition Centre

== Japanese leg ==
The Japanese leg kicked off on March 18, 2002 at the Rainbow Hall in Nagoya. The tour is part of a worldwide tour to promote Iowa; the Japan Iowa Tour was preceded by the European Iowa Tour.

Date	City	Country	Venue
March 18, 2002	Nagoya	Japan	Rainbow Hall
March 19, 2002	Osaka	Japan	Zepp
March 20, 2002	Osaka	Japan	Zepp
March 21, 2002	Osaka	Japan	Zepp
March 23, 2002	Tokyo	Japan	Tokyo Bay NK Hall
March 24, 2002	Tokyo	Japan	Tokyo Bay NK Hall
March 26, 2002	Kawasaki	Japan	Club Citta
March 28, 2002	Tokyo	Japan	Zepp

== European open air leg ==
This leg consisted of several festival appearances across Europe, beginning with the Festival Ilha Do Ermal on August 20, 2002, and ending with an appearance at the 2 Days a Week Festival in Austria. They also notably performed at the 2002 Reading and Leeds Festivals in the United Kingdom.

Because of the shorter set times available at festivals, "Gently" and "New Abortion" were removed from the setlist on this leg.

Date	City	Country	Venue
August 20, 2002	Vieira do Minho	Portugal	Festival da Ilha do Ermal
August 21, 2002	Gijón	Spain	Gijón Festival
August 23, 2002	Leeds	United Kingdom	Temple Newsam Park
August 24, 2002	Glasgow	United Kingdom	Glasgow Green
August 25, 2002	Reading	United Kingdom	Richfield Avenue
August 27, 2002	Belfast	United Kingdom	Odyssey Arena
August 29, 2002	Wiesen	Austria	2 Days a Week
