= Jim Root Telecaster =

Signature guitar of American guitar player Jim Root

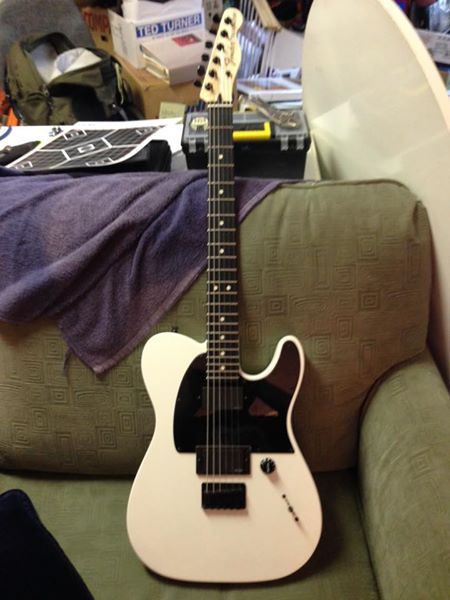
- Fender Jim Root Telecaster in Flat White finish
- Manufacturer: Fender
- Period: July 2007–present

Construction
- Body type: Solid
- Neck joint: Bolt-on
- Scale: 25.5 inches (647.7 mm)

Woods
- Body: Mahogany
- Neck: Maple
- Fretboard: Maple or Ebony

Hardware
- Bridge: Hardtail String-Thru
- Pickup: EMG

Colors available
- Flat Black or Flat White

The Fender Jim Root Telecaster is a signature model of the Fender Telecaster electric guitar customized for American musician Jim Root. In January 2010, Jim Root's Signature Fender Telecaster was unveiled on the Fender website, similar to the one he has been seen using on stage. As of March 2009, the difference being the headstock. The prototype originally made for Jim came with the 1970s style Stratocaster headstock, which Root had shaved down to a standard Telecaster shape. This made the 1970s Fender Telecaster logo go to the very edge of the headstock. The guitar build includes a mahogany body and EMG 81/60 Humbucker Pickups.

== Basic Information ==
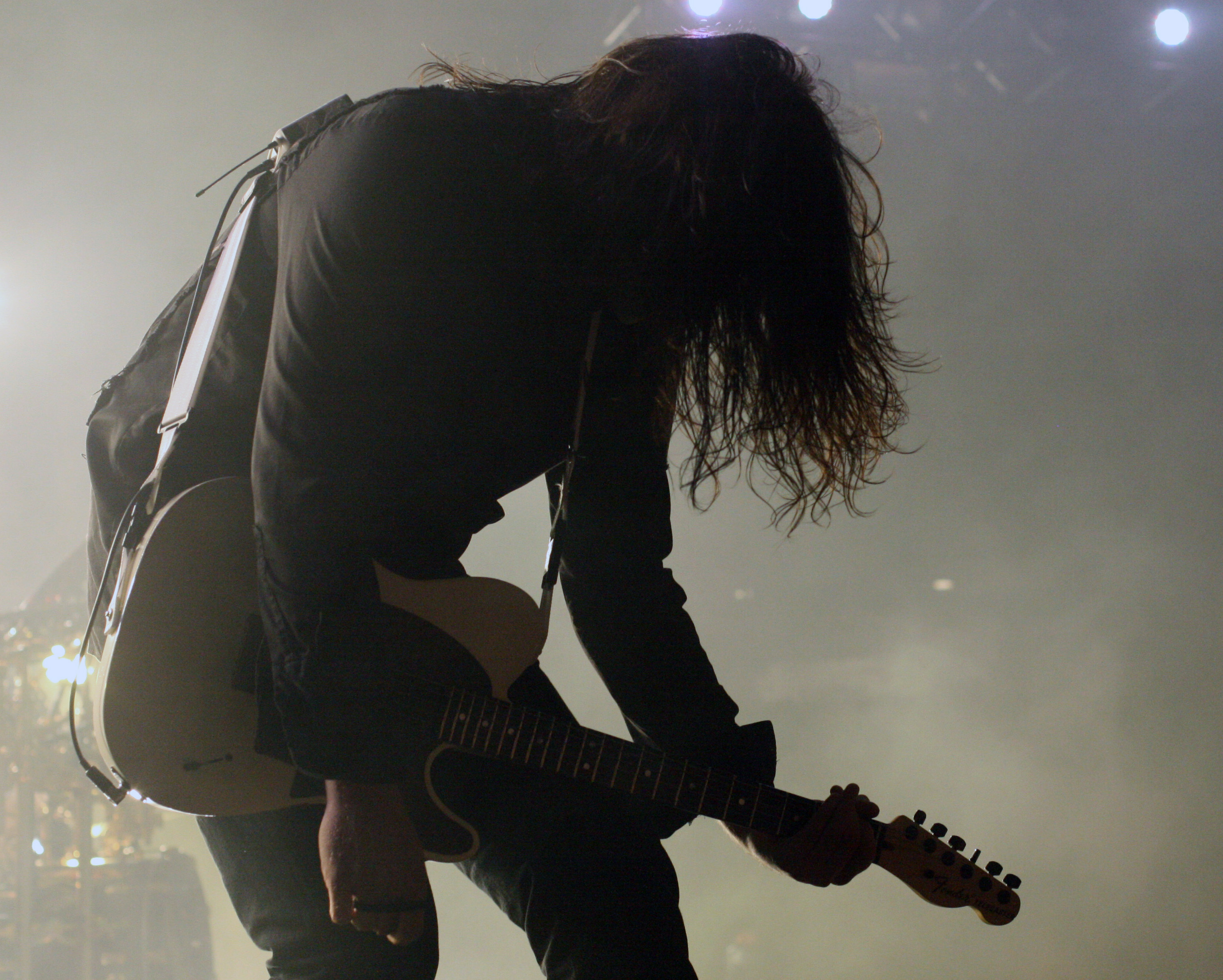
Jim Root performing live with his Telecaster

Root has previously used Jackson, Charvel, PRS and Maverick guitars. He was impressed with the quality of Fender and contacted Alex Perez. They used the Fender Showmaster as an idea to build on. In 2010, Fender released a Jim Root Signature Fender Telecaster guitar. The guitar comes in two models; one with a black finish and maple fingerboard, and the other in a white finish with an ebony fingerboard. It differs from many Fender guitars. The guitar has a mahogany body, a nitro-lacquer finish, dual humbuckers, a single master volume, an ebony fingerboard and a 12" neck radius. It has traits of both a Gibson guitar and a Fender guitar. Root said it's a mix of classic and modern. The guitar's heel is shaved so the player can access higher frets. Root chose a nitro-lacquer finish because it tends to wear quicker than the normal polyurethane finish. The guitar comes with a SKB molded case with a blood red plush interior. Root uses EMG active pickups. This guitar is made in Mexico while his signature Stratocasters are made in America. More recently they have released a Squier version of the Telecaster with passive solid-covered humbuckers.

== Build ==
The Jim Root Telecaster is a slab Mahogany body that is not fully contoured. It only has the tummy-cutaway and a shaved heel. It does not have the fore-arm contour. The guitar is rear routed with a pickguard, and features active pickups, an EMG 81 in the bridge pickup position and an EMG 60 in the neck position.

Root modeled the neck after a Jackson/Charvel style neck. It is a maple neck with either a maple fretboard or an ebony fretboard. It has a 12 in (300 mm) radius and Dunlop jumbo frets. The neck is finished with Satin Urethane making it feel soft. The Nut Width is 1.650 in (41.9 mm) thick. The nut is made of synthetic bone. The scale length is 25.5 in (650 mm).

== Notable Users ==
Jim Root (b. 1971) of Slipknot. Self explanatory as it was designed by Root.

- Duff McKagan (b. 1964) of Guns N' Roses referenced his in an interview.
- Tony Perry (b. 1986) of Pierce The Veil. Owns multiple, all finished in various neon colours.
- Charlie Simpson (b. 1985) of Busted.
- Jiří Urban mladší of Dymytry. Owns Black with maple freatboard, seen at multiple shows. Also has Fender Jim Root Stratocaster.
