= Left Behind (Slipknot song) =

Single by Slipknot

from the album Iowa
- Released: October 29, 2001
- Genre: Nu metal; hard rock
- Length: 4:01
- Label: Roadrunner
- Songwriters: Corey Taylor; Mick Thomson; Jim Root; Paul Gray; Joey Jordison; Shawn "Clown" Crahan; Chris Fehn; Sid Wilson; Craig "133" Jones
- Producers: Ross Robinson; Slipknot

Slipknot singles chronology
"Spit It Out" (2000)	"Left Behind" (2001)	"My Plague" (2002)

Music video
- "Left Behind" on YouTube

"Left Behind" is a song by American heavy metal band Slipknot. Produced by Ross Robinson and the band, it was released as the first single from the band's second studio album, Iowa (2001), on October 29, 2001. The single reached No. 30 on Billboard's Mainstream Rock chart, No. 24 on the UK Singles Chart and No. 5 on the UK Rock & Metal Singles Chart. It was also nominated for the Grammy Award for Best Metal Performance in 2002.

== Composition and lyrics ==
"Left Behind" was originally known as "Lust Disease": "An old song that we'd been playing around with before the first album," recalled frontman Corey Taylor. "We ripped it apart and rebuilt it. We wanted to have a melodic element in there somewhere, and 'Left Behind' had a darkness that meant it sat well with the other songs."

It was described by British magazine Kerrang! as "considerably more melodic than the rest of the album, providing a brief moment of respite from the outright nastiness elsewhere". Taylor recalls that the song was originally "much more melodic". Producer Ross Robinson accused the vocalist of "trying too hard" and encouraged him to make it "a little more guttural and put a lot more emphasis on it and just make it a smack in the mouth."

Taylor has explained that the lyrics inspired by a period during which he was homeless, living under a bridge in his hometown of Des Moines, Iowa. Speaking to VH1, he reminisced that "'Left Behind' is a song about a time of my life that was really hard – I was homeless ... it's funny how many people you meet when you're homeless ... you find out so much about them, and you rely on them so much, and then when things start happening for you, those faces disappear and they're gone," concluding that the song is "about leaving behind the lives that make up your past."

== Promotion and release ==
Prior to its official release, "Left Behind" (along with "People = Shit") was leaked online and made available for digital download in July 2001. The song was subsequently played by several radio stations in the United States, forcing Roadrunner to officially release the track to radio earlier than originally intended. The song was released as a single on October 29, featuring live versions of Slipknot tracks "Liberate" and "Surfacing" as B-sides.

== Music video ==
The music video for "Left Behind" was directed by Dave Meyers and filmed in Los Angeles, California. The video combines footage of the band performing in a forest with a narrative centred around a young protagonist, who is described by Metal Injection's Nick Dauk as "something of an outcast". Ryan Book of The Music Times outlined the narrative of the video as follows: "A filthy kid works at a butcher shop chopping meat. He gets bullied. He lives alone in a rotting hulk of a house and eats his cereal with filthy water for some reason. Eventually those bullies throw a rock through the window of his rotting home and it rains." The director's cut of the "Left Behind" music video was featured on the band's second video album Disasterpieces, released in November 2002. The clean version of the video ends with the boy going into his basement whereas the director's cut version ends with a scene with the boy killing a goat off-screen cutting back to the scene at the butcher shop.

"Left Behind" has received praise from a number of commentators for its music video. Noisecreep ranked "Left Behind" as the sixth best Slipknot music video of all-time in 2013. Metal Injection ranked it the band's ninth best video, praising it for effectively capturing "the remorseful lyrics that focus on vocalist Corey Taylor's sorrow in leaving behind the support system he had while going through a period of homelessness". Rock Sound magazine included "Left Behind" at number two on its list of "Slipknot's 10 Most Shocking Music Video Moments", describing it as "the stuff of nightmares".

== Reception ==
=== Commercial ===
"Left Behind" debuted at No. 37 on Billboard's Mainstream Rock chart. It spent a total of ten weeks on the chart and peaked at No. 30. Outside of the United States, the song reached No. 97 on the Australian Singles Chart, No. 24 on the UK Singles Chart, No. 22 on the Scottish Singles Chart, and No. 5 on the UK Rock & Metal Singles Chart.

=== Critical ===
"Left Behind" received positive reviews from critics. Steven Wells of the NME praised Slipknot as "the perfect American rock band" on the song, outlining that it "stammers, spasms and shits itself and then it splatters the spinal columns of hard-bodied jock-zombies all over the fucking walls". Loudwire ranked "Left Behind" as the band's eighth best track, claiming that "it shows off the band's attention to and knack for melody, without losing its meaty, metal edge". The website also ranked it as the 15th best hard rock song of the 21st century, praising its "frantic drum patterns, blistering riffs and ... venomous screams".

In January 2002, "Left Behind" was nominated for the Grammy Award for Best Metal Performance at the 44th Annual Grammy Awards, alongside "The Wizard" by Black Sabbath, "Disciple" by Slayer, "Chop Suey!" by System of a Down and "Schism" by Tool. The band's bassist Paul Gray commented that "It's cool that we're nominated. I guess it's somewhat of an honor to be nominated. I'm not really worried about if we win or not", adding that he predicted System of a Down would win the award. The Grammy was instead won by Tool for "Schism", the lead single from the band's third full-length studio album Lateralus.

== Personnel ==
=== Slipknot ===
- (#8) Corey Taylor – vocals
- (#7) Mick Thomson – guitar
- (#6) Shawn Crahan – percussion
- (#5) Craig Jones – samples, media
- (#4) Jim Root – guitar
- (#3) Chris Fehn – percussion
- (#2) Paul Gray – bass
- (#1) Joey Jordison – drums
- (#0) Sid Wilson – turntables

== Track listing ==
All tracks are written by Slipknot.

CD single
No.	Title	Length
1.	"Left Behind"	4:04
2.	"Liberate" (live)	4:27
3.	"Surfacing" (live)	5:10
4.	"Left Behind" (Director's cut music video)	3:43
Total length:		17:24

7" vinyl
No.	Title	Length
1.	"Left Behind"	4:04
2.	"Liberate" (live)	4:27
Total length:		8:31

US & Japan promo single
No.	Title	Length
1.	"Left Behind"
2.	"Liberate" (live)
3.	"Surfacing" (live)

UK promo single
No.	Title	Length
1.	"Left Behind" (Single Version)

US promo single
No.	Title	Length
1.	"Left Behind" (Alternate Version)	3:40
2.	"Left Behind" (Album Version With Fade)	3:40
3.	"Left Behind" (Album Version)	4:06
Total length:		11:26

== Charts ==
Chart performance for "Left Behind"
Chart (2001)	Peak position
Australia (ARIA)	97
Canada (Billboard)	43
Scottish Singles Sales (Official Charts)	22
UK Singles (Official Charts)	24
UK Rock & Metal (Official Charts)	5
US Mainstream Rock (Billboard)	30

== Certifications ==
Certifications for "Left Behind"
Region	Certification	Certified units/sales
Canada (Music Canada)	Gold	40,000^{‡}
United Kingdom (BPI)	Silver	200,000^{‡}
^{‡} Sales+streaming figures based on certification alone.
