= Iowa (album) =

Studio album by Slipknot
- Released: August 28, 2001
- Recorded: January 22 – March 16, 2001
- Studios: Sound City and Sound Image (Van Nuys, California)
- Genres: Nu metal; groove metal
- Length: 66:17
- Label: Roadrunner
- Producers: Ross Robinson; Slipknot

Slipknot chronology
Slipknot (1999)	Iowa (2001)	Vol. 3: (The Subliminal Verses) (2004)

Singles from Iowa
- 1. "Left Behind" Released: October 29, 2001; 2. "My Plague" Released: July 8, 2002

Alternative cover one
- Cover for some versions of Iowa.

Alternative cover two
- Cover for the 10th anniversary re-release of Iowa.

Alternative cover three

Iowa is the second studio album by the American heavy metal band Slipknot. Produced by the members and Ross Robinson, it was released on August 28, 2001, by Roadrunner Records. The title refers to the band's state of origin, Iowa, which members have stated is one of their greatest sources of inspiration. With much anticipation for the album following the success of their 1999 debut album Slipknot, pressures on the band were high. Their relationships with each other suffered and this was later described as the darkest time of their career. It was also the first full album to feature guitarist Jim Root after only appearing on one song from their previous album. Despite troubles within the band and with Iowa's development, Slipknot promoted it for almost a year.

The album was a major success, premiering in the top tens of several countries. Generally positively received, it includes some of their notable songs, such as "Disasterpiece", "The Heretic Anthem", "People = Shit" and the Grammy-nominated "Left Behind" and "My Plague". More technical than their debut, Iowa is considered the band's heaviest and darkest album. It has been certified platinum in the United Kingdom, the United States and Canada.

A special edition of Iowa was reissued on November 1, 2011, to celebrate its tenth anniversary. It was accompanied by full live audio of the hit DVD Disasterpieces and a film entitled Goat directed by Shawn Crahan, with the four music videos, never-seen-before interviews and footage from the Iowa period.

== Recording and production ==
Iowa was recorded and produced at Sound City Studios and Sound Image Studios in Los Angeles, California with producer Ross Robinson, who had also produced their debut album. Drummer Joey Jordison and bassist Paul Gray began working on new music together in October 2000, and wrote material for most of the album. During this time, other members took a break after the extensive touring that had followed their debut. On January 17, 2001, Slipknot entered the studio to begin recording new material. Recording began on January 22. This period in the band's career became known as one of their worst. Jordison recalled, "That's where we got into a war," citing the lack of a break for himself and Gray. Other factors, including vocalist Corey Taylor's alcohol addiction, other members' drug addictions, and management issues affected relations in the band.

"Recording Iowa was fucking hell," recalled Crahan. "I wanted to kill myself. There was drugs, bitches, rock 'n' roll, all that shit. People expected so much of us then. 'People = Shit' was our way of saying, 'Fuck off and leave us alone.'" "There was nothing happy about Iowa," confirmed Taylor. "All of a sudden we were these metal stars and we weren't really planning for it… We'd all got caught up in the lifestyle and the problems that come with that. A darkness set in at the beginning of Iowa that none of us quite recognised." Jordison, however, noted, "Iowa, even more than the first record, was the album we really wanted to make."

It was the first album where guitarist Jim Root had been significantly involved, after joining during the later recording stages of Slipknot. During an interview with Guitar magazine in November 2001, Root explained, "It was so exciting as well as scary to be part of this whole huge process," adding that there was a lot of pressure from fellow guitarist Mick Thomson to perform well.

To FHM, Taylor revealed that he put himself in specific situations to achieve his performance on the album. While recording vocals for the closing title track, he was completely naked, vomiting all over himself, and cutting himself with broken glass. "That's where the best stuff comes from," he explained. "You've got to break yourself down before you can build something great." While producing the album, Ross Robinson was injured in a dirt bike accident, suffering a fractured back in the process. He returned to the studio after a day of hospital treatment, reportedly "putting all of his pain into the album", much to the admiration of the band. The opening track "(515)"–so named after the area code 515–features a noise instrumental provided by sampler Craig Jones. The piece is coupled with a manipulated recording of DJ Sid Wilson experiencing extreme emotional distress and screaming the word "death" shortly after having learned his grandfather died, which he voluntarily chose to record.

Iowa's recording was completed on March 16, 2001. Its cover art depicts a goat named Eeyore. According to Crahan, the cover was shot soon after the cover for their previous self-titled album.

== Music and lyrics ==
Prior to its release, members promised a much darker and heavier album than Slipknot; many sources praised the band for fulfilling their promises. In 2008, Crahan recalled: "When we did Iowa, we hated each other. We hated the world; the world hated us."

Iowa, unlike its predecessor, saw Robinson capturing the band's technicality as opposed to the raw energy which Slipknot became known for. The band was also praised again for its use of an extended line-up consisting of additional percussionists, turntables, and programmed samples. NME stated that "every possible space is covered in scrawl and cymbals: guitars, percussion, electronic squall, subhuman screaming." Iowa has also been critically acclaimed as one of the only mainstream musical albums to feature blast beat percussion, and was said to heighten its popularity after release.

Although Iowa became widely regarded as the band's heaviest album to date, some tracks incorporate melody, most apparent in the record's singles such as "My Plague" and "Left Behind". During the album's thirteenth anniversary, Revolver recalled that the record is "their most extreme album yet". They compared several songs, namely "Disasterpiece", "People = Shit" and "The Heretic Anthem" as more death metal-influenced than most of the nu metal that the album contained. While the album does draw some inspiration from hip-hop music, Iowa features less of a hip-hop influence than Slipknot's self-titled album, and instead draws its influences moreso on heavy genres like death metal and hardcore punk. The title track is also known for being the band's longest continuous song released, clocking in at just over 15 minutes.

Iowa follows the lyrical style that vocalist Corey Taylor established on Slipknot's debut; it includes strong use of metaphors to describe dark themes including misanthropy, solipsism, disgust, anger, disaffection, psychosis, and rejection. The album also includes many expletives; David Fricke of Rolling Stone magazine said "there isn't much shock value left in the words fuck and shit, which Taylor uses in some variation more than forty times in Iowa's sixty-six minutes." Fricke went on to praise Taylor's performance on the track "Iowa", comparing it to a "vivid evocation of a makeshift-cornfield grave at midnight."

"Disasterpiece", said Taylor, "is my favorite Slipknot song. We started doing pre-production for the album in a warehouse in Iowa itself. I had laryngitis and couldn't sing a note, so I was writing a lot of ideas down. When I heard them play 'Disasterpiece', I just wrote 'No one is safe' in huge letters. I knew from then that we were going to rip the throat out of the world with 'Disasterpiece'. That was the lynchpin for the whole album."

== Promotion ==
There was speculation over the title before its announcement with Nine Men, One Mission as the expected title in some sources. Iowa was later announced as its title and was named after the band's home state, which members have claimed to be the source of their energy, and they consciously made the decision to stay in the area, partially due to the fear of losing their creative direction. The opening track "(515)" is also a reference to their home state, named after the telephone area code for central Iowa. Initially the album was scheduled for release on June 19, 2001, and was to be preceded by a five-date warm-up tour. However, the mixing of the album took longer than anticipated, causing the album's release to be delayed, as well as the cancellation of the tour. The album was officially released on August 28, 2001. In support of the album, Slipknot began a new tour called the Iowa World Tour. This included: a spot on Ozzfest in 2001, an American co-headlining tour with System of a Down, as well as tours in Japan, Europe and elsewhere.

Prior to the album's release, Slipknot gave away copies of "Heretic Song" (titled "The Heretic Anthem" on the retail release), free on their website. It was limited to 666 copies, to match the chorus; "If you're 555, then I'm 666." The giveaway began on May 15, 2001, and lasted until copies sold out. The first official single released from the album was "Left Behind". In 2002, the band made a special appearance in the film Rollerball, in which they performed "I Am Hated". Following this, a second single from the album was released, "My Plague", which appeared on the soundtrack for the film Resident Evil.

== Critical reception ==
Professional ratings
Aggregate scores
Source	Rating
Metacritic	68/100
Review scores
Source	Rating
AllMusic	3/5 stars
Alternative Press	3.5/5 stars
Artistdirect	5/5 stars
Dotmusic	4/5 stars
Drowned in Sound	7/10
Entertainment Weekly	C−
NME	8/10
Playlouder	4/5 stars
Q	4/5 stars
Rolling Stone	4/5 stars

Following the success of the band's self-titled album, author Dick Porter wrote that the anticipation for a follow-up was intense. Prior to its release, Jordison proclaimed: "Wait till you hear our fuckin' next record. It smokes our first album. The shit's twice as technical, three times as heavy."

According to the review aggregator Metacritic, Iowa received "generally favorable reviews" based on a weighted average score of 68 out of 100 from 9 critic scores. The College Music Journal reviewed it as "brutal, unrelenting, scorching..." Many noted its heavy themes: Alternative Press stated, "[It is] like having a plastic bag taped over your head for an hour while Satan uses your scrotum as a speedbag....[It] is over the top… you're going to be left in stitches." NME said that it is "Exhilarating, brutal and good." Rolling Stone credited the album for its originality, stating that "nearly everything else in modern doom rock sounds banal." In its Rock & Roll Yearbook (2001), Rolling Stone declared, "Do not discount the purgative worth of Slipknot's head-spinning riffage and singer Corey Taylor's consumptive growl in 'People = Shit' and 'The Heretic Anthem'. Iowa is the sound of hell boiling over."

Producer Robinson was praised for his work: Uncut noted, "The barely relenting, tumbling noise attack marshalled by nu metal uber-producer Ross Robinson is expert." Reviewing for Yahoo!, John Mulvey said, "They're an evolutionary dead end, the final, absolute triumph of nu metal."

The first single, "Left Behind", was nominated for the 2002 Grammy Award for Best Metal Performance at the 44th Grammy Awards. The second single, "My Plague", was nominated in 2003 for the same award at the 45th Grammy Awards. The single "Left Behind" peaked in the top thirty for single sales the United States and the UK. In addition, "My Plague" reached the 43rd position on the UK charts. Iowa was ranked sixth in the "50 Albums of the year" by NME in 2001. The album reached the top position on the UK Albums Chart, and the second spot on the ARIA Charts in Australia. The album reached the third spot on the Billboard 200 and the Finnish Albums Chart. On October 10, 2001, the album was certified Platinum in the United States. In Canada, the Canadian Recording Industry Association certified the album as Platinum, on September 5, 2001. The British Phonographic Industry has certified the album as Gold in the UK.

Accolades for Iowa
Publication	List	Year	Rank	Ref.
Artistdirect	Top 15 New Wave of American Heavy Metal Albums	2015	1	
Consequence	75 Best Metal Albums of All Time	2025	18	
Kerrang!	The 50 Best Albums of the 21st century	2009	3	
Kerrang!	666 Albums You Must Hear Before You Die!	2011	N/A	
Kerrang!	The 50 Heaviest Albums Of All Time	2011	4	
Kerrang!	50 Greatest Metal Albums Ever!	2016	27	
Loudwire	Top 11 Metal Albums of the 2000s	2011	2	
Loudwire	The 100 Best Rock + Metal Albums of the 21st Century	2016	6	
Loudwire	The 50 Best Nu-Metal Albums of All-Time	2019	4	
Metal Hammer Germany	The 500 Greatest Metal Albums of All Time	2024	24	
Metal Hammer UK	100 Greatest Albums of the 21st Century	2016	1	
Metal Hammer UK	The 50 best metal albums of the 2000s	2023	2	
Rock Sound	101 Modern Classics	2012	17	
Rock Sound	250 Greatest Albums of Our Lifetime	2019	52	
Rolling Stone	The 100 Greatest Metal Albums of All Time	2017	50	
Terrorizer	The 40 Most Important Extreme Albums of the Century	2014	15	

== Track listing ==
All tracks are written by Slipknot.

No.	Title	Length
1.	"(515)"	0:59
2.	"People = Shit"	3:35
3.	"Disasterpiece"	5:08
4.	"My Plague"	3:40
5.	"Everything Ends"	4:14
6.	"The Heretic Anthem"	4:13
7.	"Gently"	4:54
8.	"Left Behind"	4:01
9.	"The Shape"	3:37
10.	"I Am Hated"	2:37
11.	"Skin Ticket"	6:41
12.	"New Abortion"	3:36
13.	"Metabolic"	3:59
14.	"Iowa"	15:03
Total length:		66:17

Japanese edition bonus track
No.	Title	Length
15.	"Liberate" (Live)	4:25
Total length:		70:42

Japanese edition bonus DVD
No.	Title	Length
1.	"My Plague" (music video)
2.	"Left Behind" (music video)

10th Anniversary edition (bonus track)
No.	Title	Length
15.	"My Plague (New Abuse mix)"	2:59
Total length:		69:16

10th Anniversary edition (disc two) – Disasterpieces (live at London Arena, 2002)
No.	Title	Length
1.	"(515)"	4:04
2.	"People = Shit"	3:36
3.	"Liberate"	3:38
4.	"Left Behind"	3:39
5.	"Eeyore"	2:38
6.	"Disasterpiece"	5:22
7.	"Purity"	5:26
8.	"Gently"	4:36
9.	"Eyeless"	4:57
10.	"Drum Solo"	3:59
11.	"My Plague"	3:47
12.	"New Abortion"	4:22
13.	"The Heretic Anthem"	4:59
14.	"Spit It Out"	7:44
15.	"Wait and Bleed"	3:27
16.	"742617000027"	1:44
17.	"(sic)"	4:22
18.	"Surfacing"	5:34
Total length:		77:54

10th Anniversary edition (disc three) – Goat
No.	Title	Length
1.	"My Plague (music video)"
2.	"Left Behind (music video)"
3.	"The Heretic Anthem (live) (music video)"
4.	"People = Shit (live) (music video)"
5.	"Goat: An hour-long collection of rare footage and interviews"

Vinyl release - side one
No.	Title	Length
1.	"(515)"	0:59
2.	"People = Shit"	3:35
3.	"Disasterpiece"	5:08
4.	"My Plague"	3:40
5.	"Everything Ends"	4:13
Total length:		17:35

Vinyl release - side two
No.	Title	Length
1.	"The Heretic Anthem"	4:13
2.	"Gently"	4:54
3.	"Left Behind"	4:01
4.	"The Shape"	3:37
Total length:		16:45

Vinyl release - side three
No.	Title	Length
1.	"I Am Hated"	2:37
2.	"Skin Ticket"	6:41
3.	"New Abortion"	3:36
4.	"Metabolic"	3:59
Total length:		16:53

Vinyl release - side four
No.	Title	Length
1.	"Iowa"	15:03
Total length:		15:03

== Personnel ==
Aside from their real names, members of the band are referred to by numbers zero through eight.

Slipknot

- (#8) Corey Taylor – vocals
- (#7) Mick Thomson – guitar
- (#6) Shawn Crahan – percussion, backing vocals, editing
- (#5) Craig Jones – samples, media
- (#4) Jim Root – guitar
- (#3) Chris Fehn – percussion, backing vocals
- (#2) Paul Gray – bass, backing vocals
- (#1) Joey Jordison – drums
- (#0) Sid Wilson – turntables, vocals on "(515)"

Production

- Ross Robinson – production
- Slipknot – production
- Mike Fraser – engineering
- Andy Wallace – mixing
- Steve Sisco – assistant engineering
- George Marino – mastering
- Steve Richards – executive producer
- Joey Jordison – mixing, additional vocal production on "My Plague (New Abuse mix)"

Artwork

- Shawn Crahan – creative direction, photography
- T42 Design – art direction, layout
- Joey Jordison – Slipknot logo and Tribal-S logo design
- Stefan Seskis – photography
- Neil Zlozower – band photography

== Charts ==
=== Weekly charts ===
2001 weekly chart performance for Iowa
Chart (2001)	Peak position
Australian Albums (ARIA)	2
Austrian Albums (Ö3 Austria)	8
Belgian Albums (Ultratop Flanders)	4
Belgian Albums (Ultratop Wallonia)	7
Canadian Albums (Billboard)	1
Danish Albums (Hitlisten)	19
Dutch Albums (Album Top 100)	15
Finnish Albums (Suomen virallinen lista)	3
French Albums (SNEP)	7
German Albums (Offizielle Top 100)	4
Hungarian Albums (MAHASZ)	13
Irish Albums (IRMA)	3
Italian Albums (FIMI)	5
Japanese Albums (Oricon)	4
New Zealand Albums (RMNZ)	5
Norwegian Albums (VG-lista)	12
Polish Albums (ZPAV)	7
Scottish Albums (Official Charts)	1
Spanish Albums (PROMUSICAE)	11
Swedish Albums (Sverigetopplistan)	10
Swiss Albums (Schweizer Hitparade)	13
UK Albums (Official Charts)	1
UK Rock & Metal Albums (Official Charts)	1
US Billboard 200	3

2011 weekly chart performance for Iowa
Chart (2011)	Peak position
Japanese Albums (Oricon)	39

2021 weekly chart performance for Iowa
Chart (2021)	Peak position
Portuguese Albums (AFP)	27

=== Year-end charts ===
2001 year-end chart performance for Iowa
Chart (2001)	Position
Canadian Albums (Nielsen SoundScan)	99
UK Albums (OCC)	128
US Billboard 200	150

2002 year-end chart performance for Iowa
Chart (2002)	Position
Canadian Alternative Albums (Nielsen SoundScan)	158
Canadian Metal Albums (Nielsen SoundScan)	78

== Certifications ==
Certifications and sales for Iowa
Region	Certification	Certified units/sales
Australia (ARIA)	Gold	35,000^{^}
Belgium (BRMA)	Gold	25,000^{*}
Canada (Music Canada)	Platinum	100,000^{^}
France (SNEP)	Gold	100,000^{*}
Germany (BVMI)	Gold	150,000^{^}
Japan (RIAJ)	Gold	100,000^{^}
Netherlands (NVPI)	Gold	40,000^{^}
New Zealand (RMNZ)	Gold	7,500^{^}
United Kingdom (BPI)	Platinum	300,000^{‡}
United States (RIAA)	Platinum	1,000,000^{^}
^{*} Sales figures based on certification alone.^{^} Shipments figures based on certification alone.^{‡} Sales+streaming figures based on certification alone.
