= Disasterpieces =

Video by Slipknot
- Released: November 26, 2002
- Recorded: February 16, 2002
- Venue: London Dockland Arena (London)
- Genre: Nu metal
- Length: 98:55 (concert only)
- Label: Roadrunner
- Director: Matthew Amos
- Producer: Matthew Dillon

Slipknot chronology
Welcome to Our Neighborhood (1999)	Disasterpieces (2002)	Voliminal: Inside the Nine (2006)

Disasterpieces is the second video album by American heavy metal band Slipknot. Unveiled at an advance screening in New York City on November 1, 2002, and released on November 22 by Roadrunner Records, the two-disc set features a concert at London Dockland Arena, and all the band's music videos to date, including songs from Slipknot and Iowa.

The concert was filmed by 26 cameras, including one on the headstock of Mick Thomson's guitar and a "first person" point of view of several band-members. The show was edited in part by band member Shawn Crahan who watched all the footage recorded at the show.

Disasterpieces met a positive critical reception, with many citing the quick editing and sound quality as strong points. Certified quadruple platinum by the RIAA in 2005, it is the band's highest-selling DVD to date, shipping at least 400,000 units as a longform video.

== Recording and production ==
Disasterpieces was filmed at the now defunct London Dockland Arena in England on February 16, 2002 – one of the final European dates on the Iowa World Tour. "It was one of my favourite ever concerts," said frontman Corey Taylor. "England has always been special for us because it's one of the first places that really understood us. The show was incredible: the fans went nuts and we did too. The whole place became absolutely unglued. Afterwards, we were like, 'Wow – where do we go from here?'"

The concert was shot with 26 different cameras under the direction of Matthew Amos and documents the show, backstage action and an in-store signing in Paris, France. In addition to operated cameras each band member had an individual camera which was attached to the side of their masks, apart from Joey Jordison and Mick Thomson whose camera was attached to the headstock of his guitar. The concept behind these cameras was to allow the viewer to see the show from the band member's point of view. However they did cause some discomfort and problems for some band members. Bassist Paul Gray removed his after four songs, explaining that "they gave us this big [camera] pack to wear around our waist. So when I was jumping around, the thing started sliding down my leg". Also during the song "Spit It Out" DJ Sid Wilson had his camera stolen when he was in the crowd resulting in a fight between Corey and Sid, however it was returned at the end of the show, all of this is documented on the DVD.

The performance was edited by percussionist Shawn Crahan and Phil Richardson. Crahan explained that he didn't have an outline when he began editing; to the disbelief of others closest to him, he watched all the footage, to find the most appropriate footage to help immerse the viewer in the show. Additional content on the two-disc set includes all music videos by the band at the time of release and, in audio form, "Purity", which was removed from Slipknot for legal reasons. The DVD also gives the ability to the viewer to use the remote to change the viewing angle during "Disasterpiece" and to view individual band member mask cameras during "People=Shit" and "The Heretic Anthem".

== Reception ==
Professional ratings
Review scores
Source	Rating
Ottawa XPress	link
Rolling Stone	link

Disasterpieces was well received by critics. Kirk Miller of Rolling Stone complimented the multitude of camera angles and quick edits, which take "advantage of the masked metal giants' sprawling live show". Ottawa XPress reviewer Mitch Joel wrote that the sound was "mixed perfectly ... [making] songs like 'People = Shit', 'Spit It Out' and 'Surfacing' rocket". He concluded, "Disasterpieces is an awesome and all-embracing package."

Disasterpieces peaked at number three in the Billboard Top Music Videos chart and rose to number one in Finland. On January 6, 2003, the RIAA certified Disasterpieces platinum in the United States, and it was declared quadruple platinum on November 18, 2005.

It was honored with a 2002 Metal Edge Readers' Choice Award for DVD/Home Video of the Year.

== Contents ==
Disc one: The Music Video Film

Live at London Arena (February 16, 2002)

1. "(515)"
2. "People = Shit"
3. "Liberate"
4. "Left Behind"
5. "Eeyore"
6. Set-Up
7. "Disasterpiece"
8. Soundcheck
9. "Purity"
10. "Gently"
11. "Sid Solo"
12. "Eyeless"
13. In-Store [Paris]
14. "Joey Drum Solo"
15. Mask Cams
16. "My Plague"
17. "New Abortion"
18. "The Heretic Anthem"
19. "Spit It Out"
20. "Wait and Bleed"
21. It Begins
22. "742617000027"
23. "(sic)"
24. "Surfacing"

Disc two: Music Videos

- "My Plague" (New Abuse mix)
- "Left Behind"
- "Wait and Bleed" (original cut)
- "Wait and Bleed" (animated version)
- "Spit It Out"
- "Purity" (audio only)

== Personnel ==
Aside from their real names, members of the band are also referred to by numbers zero through eight.

Slipknot

- (#0) Sid Wilson – turntables
- (#1) Joey Jordison – drums, mixing
- (#2) Paul Gray – bass, backing vocals
- (#3) Chris Fehn – percussion, backing vocals
- (#4) Jim Root – guitars
- (#5) Craig Jones – samples, media
- (#6) Shawn Crahan – percussion, backing vocals, editing
- (#7) Mick Thomson – guitars
- (#8) Corey Taylor – lead vocals

Production team

- Matthew Amos – director
- Gerard Schmidt – interstitials director
- Phil Richardson – editing
- Morgan-William Turner – special features editing
- Colin Richardson – mixing
- Ted Jensen – mastering
- Mr. Scott Design – package layout
- Matthew Dillon – DVD producer
- David "Lee" Rath – DVD project coordinator
- Monte Conner – A&R

== Certifications ==
Region	Certification	Certified units/sales
Canada (Music Canada)	3× Platinum	30,000^{^}
Germany (BVMI)	Gold	25,000^{^}
United Kingdom (BPI)	Gold	25,000^{^}
United States (RIAA)	4× Platinum	400,000^{^}
^{^} Shipments figures based on certification alone.
