= Purity (Slipknot song) =

Song by Slipknot

from the album Slipknot
- Released: June 29, 1999
- Recorded: February 1999
- Studio: Indigo Ranch Studios; (Malibu, California)
- Genre: Nu metal
- Length: 4:14 (original release); 4:25 (10th anniversary edition)
- Label: Roadrunner; Attic; I Am
- Songwriters: Corey Taylor; Mick Thomson; Paul Gray; Joey Jordison; Shawn "Clown" Crahan; Chris Fehn; Sid Wilson; Craig "133" Jones
- Producer: Ross Robinson

"Purity" is a song by American nu-metal band Slipknot, which appeared on the original version of the band's 1999 self-titled debut album. Due to copyright infringement issues, "Purity" and the interlude track "Frail Limb Nursery" were removed from later editions of the album. "Purity" was later reinstated for the 10th Anniversary edition of the album; it was preluded by the end of "Frail Limb Nursery".

== Writing ==
"Purity" and "Frail Limb Nursery" were inspired by a story published online about a girl named Purity Knight, who was kidnapped and buried alive. The website, called Crime Scene, presents fictional stories as real life crime cases. Originally, the website included no disclaimer saying that it was a work of fiction. Many readers believed the story to be true, including Corey Taylor: "I still think it's real – see the thing whether it's true or not, it's a real story – that we read about – that fucked our whole world up – can you imagine a girl being buried in a box and having all this lecherous bullshit drip down on her from this guy? [...] – it just hurts your head".

According to Taylor, the song "was originally called 'Despise' but it didn't work when we tried to put it together… Ross [Robinson] took it and helped us restructure it." In an interview, Taylor claimed the lyrics had been written five years prior to the song's release, that only the name had been inspired by the Purity Knight story. He also said that inspiration came from films such as Boxing Helena and The Collector, and not the story.

"Frail Limb Nursery" is the prelude to "Purity", and directly samples the audio used on Crime Scene. The outro of the track "Tattered & Torn" features the intro to "Frail Limb Nursery" on the later edition of the album, though the latter was never included on any rereleases.

== Release and controversy ==
After the album's release, the band had to remove the track after allegations of copyright infringement. The website that inspired the song presents fictional stories as real life crime cases, and originally included no disclaimer saying that it was a work of fiction. The case was complicated by audio samples from the authoring website being included in "Frail Limb Nursery", the prelude to "Purity".

However, to prevent the entire album being pulled, the band removed "Purity" and "Frail Limb Nursery". Slightly remastered standard and digipak versions of the album were issued in December 1999, replacing both tracks with "Me Inside". Although "Frail Limb Nursery" was never rereleased, "Purity" was included on the DVD Disasterpieces and the 10th anniversary edition of Slipknot, and live versions also appeared on the live album 9.0: Live and greatest hits album Antennas to Hell.

== Personnel ==
Aside from their real names, members of the band are referred to by numbers zero through eight.

Slipknot

- (#8) Corey Taylor – vocals
- (#7) Mick Thomson – guitars
- (#6) Shawn "Clown" Crahan – percussion
- (#5) Craig "133" Jones – samples, media
- (#4) Jim Root – guitars
- (#3) Chris Fehn – percussion
- (#2) Paul Gray – bass
- (#1) Joey Jordison – drums, mixing
- (#0) Sid Wilson – turntables

Production

- Ross Robinson – producer, mixing
- Rob Agnello – engineering
- Chuck Johnson – engineering, mixing
- Joey Jordison and Sean McMahon – additional mixing
- Kevin Miles – mixing
- Steven Remote – location recording engineer
- Eddy Schreyer – mastering at Oasis Mastering, Studio City, California

Artwork

- Stefan Seskis – album cover, tray card photography
- Dean Karr – band photography
- T42Design – album design, lettering
- Lynda Kusnetz – creative director
- Slipknot – packing concept

Management

- Steve Richards – worldwide management for No Name Management
- Ross Robinson – A&R
- Monte Conner – A&R for Roadrunner Records
- Jeffrey Light – legal representation
- Dave Kirby – booking for The Agency Group
