= The Heretic Anthem =

"The Heretic Anthem" / "Heretic Song"
- Cover art for the "Heretic Song" single

Promotional single by Slipknot

from the album Iowa
- A-side: "Heretic Song"
- Released: May 15, 2001
- Recorded: 2001
- Studio: Sound City and Sound Image (Van Nuys, California)
- Genre: Death metal
- Length: 4:19
- Label: Roadrunner
- Songwriters: Paul Gray; Joey Jordison; Corey Taylor
- Producers: Slipknot; Ross Robinson

"The Heretic Anthem" (released as "Heretic Song" as a single) is a song by American heavy metal band Slipknot. The song was released as a promotional single from their second album Iowa. Revolver magazine praised the track and described that it "flirt[s] with full-on death metal in their extremity, both sonic and thematic." Kerrang! said the song was "A death-metal-influenced epic... A brutal, rampant and pissed-off dose of metal fury."

== Song meaning ==
The song was written about record labels who initially showed no interest in signing a recording contract with the band. The lyrics, "I bleed for this and I bleed for you/ Still you look in my face like I'm somebody new/ TOY – nobody wants anything I've got/ Which is fine, because you're made of/ Everything – I'm – NOT", reflect this attitude.

== Track listing ==
Promo single

No.	Title	Length
1.	"Heretic Song" (Rough Mix)	4:19

UK promo single

No.	Title	Length
1.	"Heretic Song" (Clean Version)	4:19

EU promo single

No.	Title	Length
1.	"The Heretic Anthem" (live)	4:45
2.	"The Heretic Anthem" (live video)	4:45
3.	"DVD Trailer" (video)	2:12

== Covers ==
- The American band Periphery covered the song in 2012 and released as a bonus track for the limited edition of Periphery II: This Time It's Personal.
- Deathcore band Spite covered the song and released it as a single in 2014
- Carnifex covered the song on their 2018 EP Bury Me in Blasphemy

== Personnel ==
=== Slipknot ===
- (#0) Sid Wilson – turntables
- (#1) Joey Jordison – drums
- (#2) Paul Gray – bass
- (#3) Chris Fehn – percussion, backing vocals
- (#4) Jim Root – guitar
- (#5) Craig Jones – samples, media
- (#6) Shawn Crahan – percussion, backing vocals
- (#7) Mick Thomson – guitar
- (#8) Corey Taylor – lead vocals

=== Production ===
- Ross Robinson – producer
- Mike Fraser – engineer
- Andy Wallace – mixing
- Steve Sisco – assistant engineer
- George Marino – mastering
- Steve Richards – executive producer
