= Wait and Bleed =

Single by Slipknot

from the album Slipknot
- Released: July 28, 1999
- Studio: Indigo Ranch (Malibu, California)
- Genre: Nu metal; rap metal
- Length: 2:27
- Label: Roadrunner
- Songwriters: Shawn Crahan; Chris Fehn; Paul Gray; Craig Jones; Joey Jordison; Corey Taylor; Mick Thomson; Sid Wilson
- Producer: Ross Robinson

Slipknot singles chronology
"Wait and Bleed" (1999)	"Spit It Out" (2000)

Music video
- "Wait and Bleed" on YouTube

Claymation music video
- "Wait and Bleed" on YouTube

"Wait and Bleed" is the debut single by American heavy metal band Slipknot, released as the lead single from their 1999 self-titled debut album. After being remixed to replace the screamed vocals in the verses with more melodic singing, it was released as the lead single from the album in July 1999, and peaked at No. 34 on Billboard's Mainstream Rock chart in February 2000. It remains one of the band's most popular songs.

== Background and writing ==
Joey Jordison recalled in an interview with Kerrang!: "I wrote the music for 'Wait and Bleed' on my own… I showed it to the guys at rehearsal, and then Corey (Taylor) wrote some lyrics really fast in our practice space… He took us to a new level immediately." Taylor recalls differently, however, saying that "Mick and Josh, our old guitar player, they were the ones who really started putting the guitar together. And then Joey grabbed it and was adding some stuff here and there. And in that hour we built that song and made it what it really was."

== Music and lyrics ==
Musically, "Wait and Bleed" has been described as "a nu-metal rumble that careens around like a particularly violent bout of bumper cars, between rough vocal yelps, a furious tempo, and corrugated riffage."

"The song's about that switch in your head that can go at any moment," noted Corey Taylor. "You go from being a civilized human being to someone who can commit terrible acts. I've always been fascinated by the fact we represent ourselves as civilized when, at any moment, we can become animals."

According to Ultimate Guitar, "Wait and Bleed" is about a man who keeps having repetitive black and white dreams about laying in a bathtub full of his own blood with his wrists slit. One day he wakes up and sees that his dream has become a reality, but he does not want to believe it and he tries to fall back asleep again.

== Release, awards and reception ==
"Wait and Bleed" earned Slipknot a first Grammy nomination in 2001 for Best Metal Performance, though it lost to Deftones' "Elite". The song won the Best Single award at the 2000 Kerrang! Awards. The song enjoyed a degree of commercial success, reaching No. 34 on the Mainstream Rock chart and No. 27 in the UK Singles Chart. It was also ranked No. 36 on VH1's "40 Greatest Metal Songs" list in 2006. In 2017, Annie Zaleski of Spin named it the eleventh best nu metal track of all time.

In 2020, Kerrang and Louder Sound ranked the song number four and number one, respectively, on their lists of the greatest Slipknot songs.

"It was just a basic song. We didn't know it was going to be that popular. The funny thing is the record label, especially new guys at the record label, were coming around when we started getting big, and they're like, 'Oh, the next record, you can write, like, three Wait And Bleeds.' And we're just like, 'You are an idiot.' Therefore, we don't do that. But obviously the band, believe it or not, we have so much control over what we do that we don't write anything for money, we don't write anything for popularity, we have to like it first. And it's just a song that we liked, and it just so happened that it got on the radio and got the attention that we didn't expect." – Chris Fehn

== Music videos ==
There are two videos for "Wait and Bleed". The first, directed by Thomas Mignone, features a live performance of the song, filmed during a performance on July 31, 1999, at the Ankeny Airfield in the band's hometown of Des Moines. The second, known as the "Claymation version", depicts all nine members as small, animated, doll-like creatures inside a laboratory inhabited by a man who is attempting to catch them. Eventually, the band cause the man to fall and be stung by dropping a jar of insects. As the band looks over the man, Chris Fehn's doll covers him in fuel and Shawn Crahan's doll sets him alight, killing him.

== Track listing ==
All songs credited to Slipknot.

CD single

1. "Wait and Bleed" (Terry Date Mix) – 2:34
2. "Spit It Out" (Overcaffeinated Hyper Version) – 2:28
3. "(sic)" (Molt-Injected Mix) – 3:28
- Includes "Wait and Bleed" live music video
- "(sic)" (Molt-Injected Mix) is missing on Netherlands release

EU promo single

1. "Wait & Bleed" (Radio Mix) – 2:34
2. "Spit It Out" (Overcaffeinated Hyper-Molt Mix) – 2:28
3. "(sic)" (Spaceship Console Mix) – 3:28
- "Wait & Bleed" (Radio Mix) does not have the final "and it waits for you!" scream unlike Terry Date mix
- "(sic)" (Spaceship Console Mix) is no different from Molt-Injected mix

US promo CD single

1. "Wait and Bleed" (Radio Mix) – 2:30
2. "Wait and Bleed" (LP Mix) – 2:27
3. "Call-Out Hook" – 0:12

UK promo CD single

1. "Wait & Bleed" (Radio Mix) – 2:30

== Personnel ==
=== Slipknot ===
All tracks produced by Slipknot

- (#0) Sid Wilson – turntables
- (#1) Joey Jordison – drums
- (#2) Paul Gray – bass
- (#3) Chris Fehn – percussion (credited but does not perform)
- (#4) Josh Brainard – guitar
- (#5) Craig Jones – samples, media
- (#6) Shawn Crahan – percussion
- (#7) Mick Thomson – guitar
- (#8) Corey Taylor – vocals

=== Additional personnel ===
- Ross Robinson – production, mixing
- Chuck Johnson – engineering, mixing, remix on track 2
- Rob Agnello – additional engineering
- Sean McMahon – mixing on track 2
- Terry Date – remix on track 1
- Ulrich Wild – remix on track 3
- Eddy Schreyer – mastering
- Thomas Mignone – direction on track 4

== Charts ==
Chart performance for "Wait and Bleed"
Chart (2000)	Peak position
Australia (ARIA)	46
Europe (Eurochart Hot 100)	98
Netherlands (Single Top 100)	52
Scottish Singles Sales (Official Charts)	25
UK Singles (Official Charts)	27
UK Rock & Metal (Official Charts)	1
US Mainstream Rock Airplay (Billboard)	34

== Certifications ==
Certifications for "Wait and Bleed"
Region	Certification	Certified units/sales
Canada (Music Canada)	2× Platinum	160,000^{‡}
New Zealand (RMNZ)	Platinum	30,000^{‡}
Portugal (AFP)	Gold	20,000^{‡}
United Kingdom (BPI)	Platinum	600,000^{‡}
United States (RIAA)	Platinum	1,000,000^{‡}
^{‡} Sales+streaming figures based on certification alone.
