= Jim Root =

American musician (born 1971)

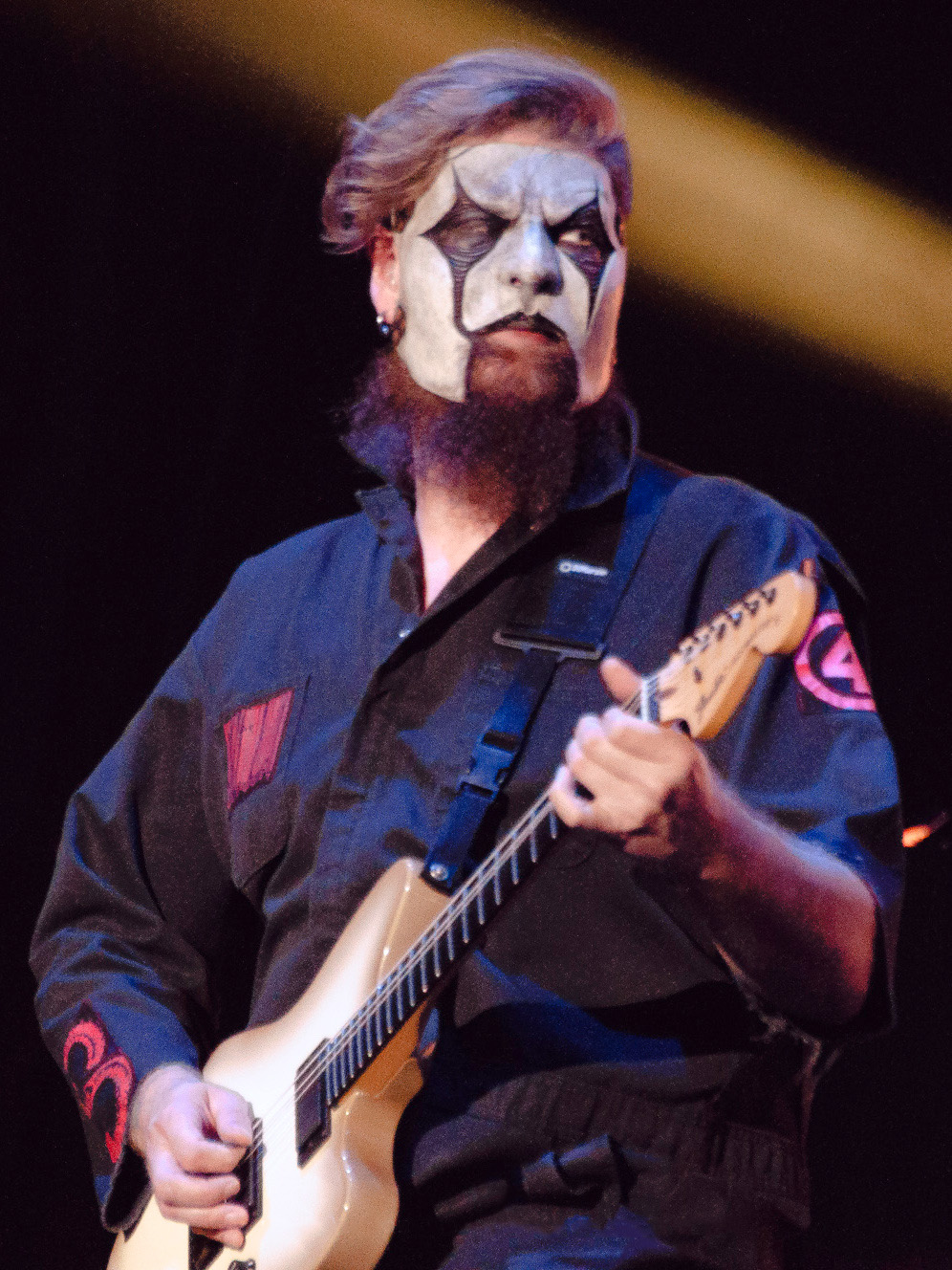
- Root performing with Slipknot in 2016

Background information
- Also known as: #4
- Born: James Donald Root; October 2, 1971 (age 54); Las Vegas, Nevada, U.S.
- Genres: Heavy metal; nu metal; groove metal; alternative metal; hard rock
- Occupations: Musician; songwriter
- Instrument: Guitar
- Years active: 1990–present
- Member of: Slipknot
- Formerly of: Stone Sour; Deadfront; Atomic Opera

James Donald Root (born October 2, 1971) is an American musician. He is one of two guitarists for nu metal band Slipknot, in which he is designated #4, as well as the former lead guitarist for rock band Stone Sour.

He is considered by a variety of journalists to be among the best and most important nu metal guitarists of all time.

== Life and career ==
Root began performing with the thrash metal band Atomic Opera from Iowa in the early 1990s (not to be confused with the hard rock band of the same name from Texas). Soon after they split up, he went on to perform in bands such as DeadFront and Stone Sour; he joined the latter in 1995, and returned to it along with vocalist Corey Taylor during its revival in 2002. Prior to joining Slipknot, he worked as a screenprinter, waiter, and busboy.

He joined Slipknot in January 1999, replacing their original guitarist, Josh Brainard, who left the band during the recording of their self-titled album, reportedly after having fulfilled his recording duties. He was approached by Shawn Crahan, Joey Jordison, and producer Ross Robinson to join, which he initially rejected but after speaking to a friend asking him to reconsider, Root called Crahan back asking if the offer was still on the table. The only songs Root recorded for during the album's sessions were for "Me Inside", which was already mostly completed in the earlier sessions, and a new song titled "Purity." Despite this, "Purity" has become a staple for most of the band's live performances.

Although originally filling in the spot of rhythm guitar in 1999, Root would later become the co-lead guitarist and, after the death of bassist Paul Gray and removal of drummer Joey Jordison, he became one of the band's main songwriters. Of Slipknot's nine member lineup which lasted between 1999 and 2010, Root was the last to join the band. Root typically performed lead guitar in Stone Sour, although he sometimes played rhythm. He has spoken of both bands' guitar style as being twin guitar: "In both bands, I fulfill both roles. In Slipknot, Mick [Thomson] has some solos, and in Stone Sour, Josh [Rand] has some solos." During the recording of Stone Sour's Audio Secrecy, he and Rand recorded their parts simultaneously.

Outside Slipknot and Stone Sour, Root has appeared on Slipknot turntablist Sid Wilson's DJ Starscream album The New Leader and John 5's The Devil Knows My Name, for the song "Black Widow of La Porte", and also appeared on the Roadrunner United project, performing the solo and harmony guitars on "Tired 'N Lonely" from the project's album The All-Star Sessions. He also appeared on Jonathan Davis and the SFA's cover of Lil Wayne's "Got Money".

On May 17, 2014, Stone Sour released an official statement saying that Root was no longer a member of the band. Moments before their statement, Root told a fan on Instagram of his departure, explaining "Not my decision. Not happy about it." In interviews, Root accused the band of being financially motivated and pursuing a more commercial musical direction, but also observed that he "wasn't really happy in that band anymore". Corey Taylor noted that the split initially put a strain on his and Root's relationship, which nonetheless was mended through channelling their frustrations into new Slipknot material.

For 13 years, Root was involved in a highly publicized relationship with Cristina Scabbia, the lead singer of Italian gothic metal band Lacuna Coil.

== Equipment ==
Untypically for a metal guitarist, Root is a long-time proponent of Fender guitars, most notably the Fender Telecaster. He credits John 5 for inspiring him to pick up the Telecaster as his guitar of choice.

In July 2007, Fender released the Jim Root Telecaster. Prior to his endorsement deal with Fender, Root had been seen using PRS, Jackson, Charvel, and Maverick electric guitars, and Guild and Martin acoustic guitars as well as a wide range of effect pedals and amplifiers. In a 2009 performance for Eurockeennes, and from 2010 to 2012, Jim used a Gibson Flying V.

In January 2010, a Jim Root Signature Fender Stratocaster was unveiled on the Fender website, similar to the one he has been seen using on stage, as of March 2009. In 2016, Fender released a sandblasted version of Root's Jazzmaster with red and black grain. This model is not available for purchase but can be seen used in several of Root's instructional videos on YouTube (as part of "The Sound and the Story") and has occasionally been seen live.

While Root primarily uses Orange Rockerverb heads live, he has been known to use a variety of amplifiers in the studio, including a modified Bogner Uberschall and Mesa Boogie Mark IIC, the later of which has appeared on 2004's Vol 3: The Subliminal Verses and 2019's We Are Not Your Kind.

In the music video for Unsainted and a performance on Jimmy Kimmel Live! Root was seen using EMG Retroactive pickups, with EMG's Instagram account suggesting that they are working on a signature set for him. This was later confirmed on the EMG Facebook page announcing that the set would debut at NAMM 2020.

On October 21, 2021, Root announced he was working on a signature model with Charvel guitars. His signature series was set to release in August 2022 for $1,499.99.

For gigs at smaller venues, and for use as a backup to his main Rockerverb setup, Root began using a Neural DSP Quad Cortex in 2024, despite previously saying he would never use digital amplifier modelers.

== Discography ==
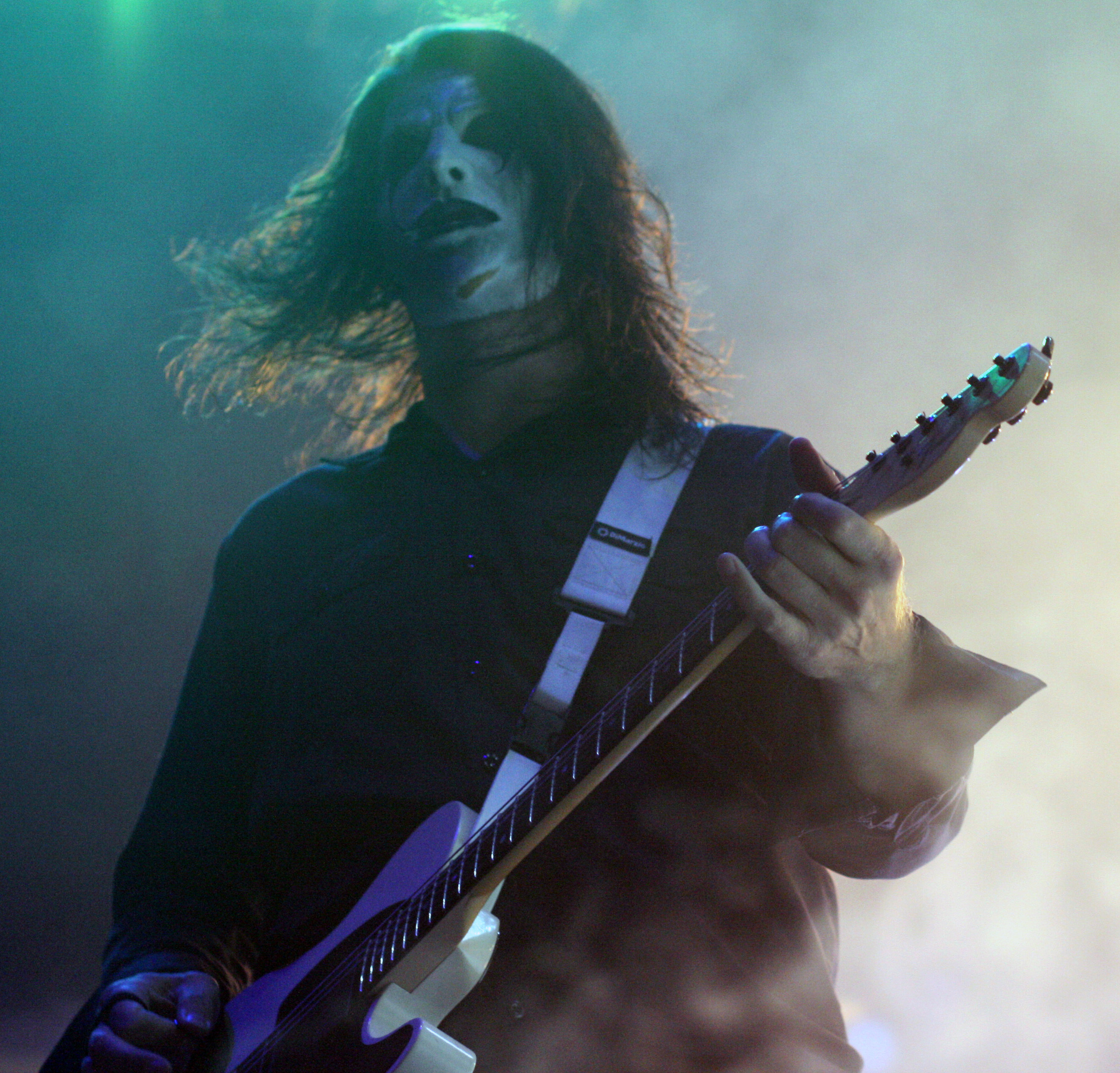
Root with Slipknot at the Mayhem Festival, 2008

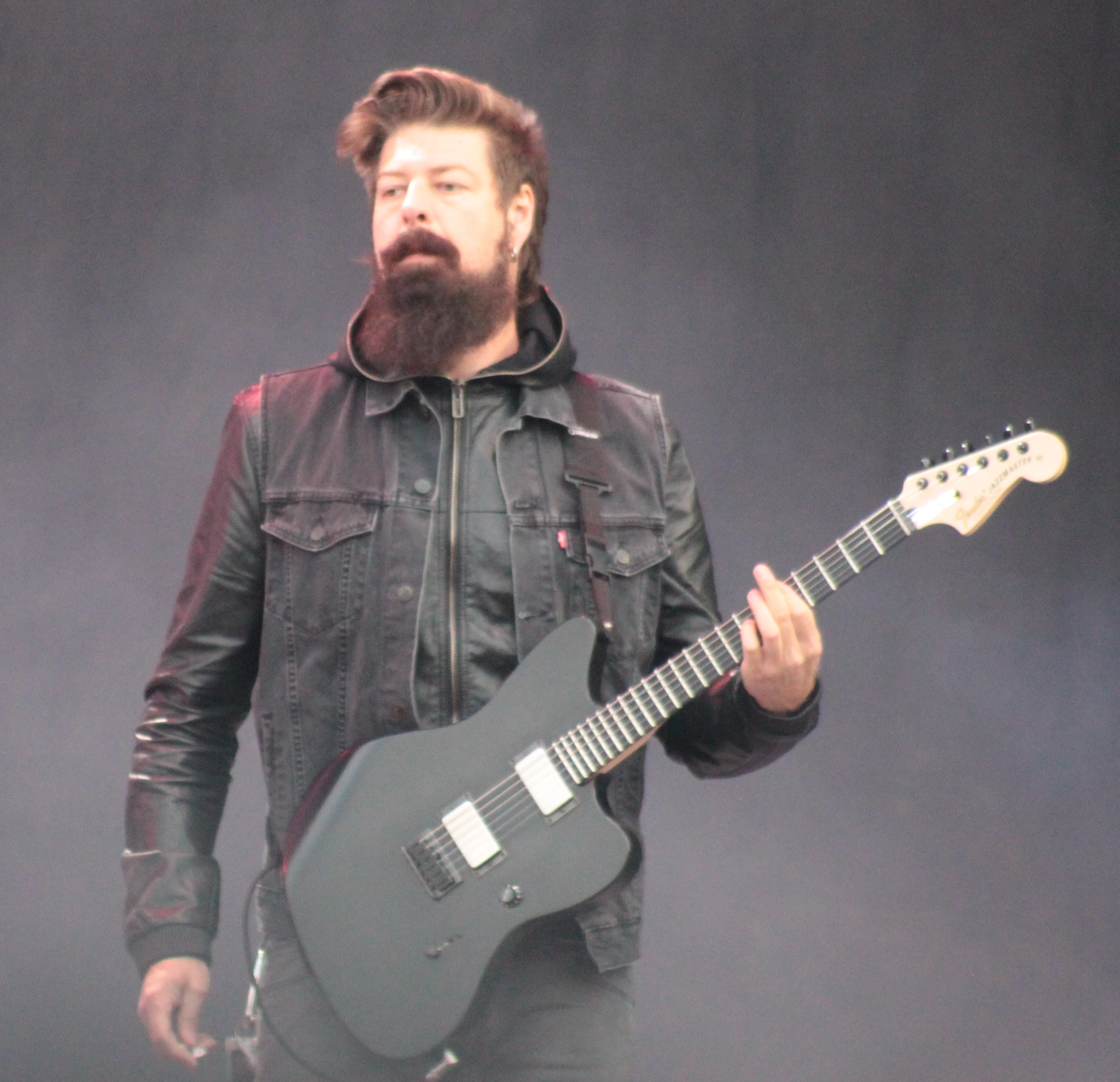
Root with Stone Sour in 2013

Atomic Opera

- 1990: The Judgement
- 1992: Disintegration Fold

Deadfront

- 1998: Nemesis

Look Outside Your Window

- 2026: Look Outside Your Window

Slipknot

- 1999: Slipknot ("Purity" only)
- 1999: Welcome to Our Neighborhood
- 2001: Iowa
- 2002: Disasterpieces
- 2004: Vol. 3: (The Subliminal Verses)
- 2005: 9.0 Live
- 2006: Voliminal: Inside the Nine
- 2008: All Hope Is Gone
- 2010: (sic)nesses
- 2012: Antennas to Hell
- 2014: .5: The Gray Chapter
- 2019: We Are Not Your Kind
- 2022: The End, So Far
- 2023: Live at MSG

Stone Sour

- 2002: Stone Sour
- 2006: Come What(ever) May
- 2007: Live in Moscow
- 2010: Audio Secrecy
- 2012: Live in Brighton
- 2012: House of Gold & Bones – Part 1
- 2013: House of Gold & Bones – Part 2

Roadrunner United

- 2005: The All-Stars Sessions

Other appearances

- 2006: The New Leader (DJ Starscream)
- 2007: The Devil Knows My Name (John 5)
- 2008: Got Money (Jonathan Davis and the SFA)
- 2008: Pay for It (The Son of a Clown Mix) (Mindless Self Indulgence)
- 2009: A Song for Chi (Fieldy)

== Filmography ==
- 1999: Welcome to Our Neighborhood
- 2002: Disasterpieces
- 2002: Rollerball
- 2006: Voliminal: Inside the Nine
- 2008: Nine: The Making of "All Hope Is Gone"
- 2009: Of the (sic): Your Nightmares, Our Dreams
- 2010: (sic)nesses
- 2011: Goat
- 2013: Jim Root: The Sound and the Story
- 2016: Jim Root: The Sound and the Story: .5 The Gray Chapter
- 2017: Day of the Gusano: Live in Mexico
- 2018: Loud Krazy Love

Preceded by None	Stone Sour guitarist 2000-2014	Succeeded by Christian Martucci

Preceded by Josh "Gnar" Brainard	Slipknot guitarist 1999-Present	Succeeded by None
