= Chris Fehn =

American musician (born 1973)

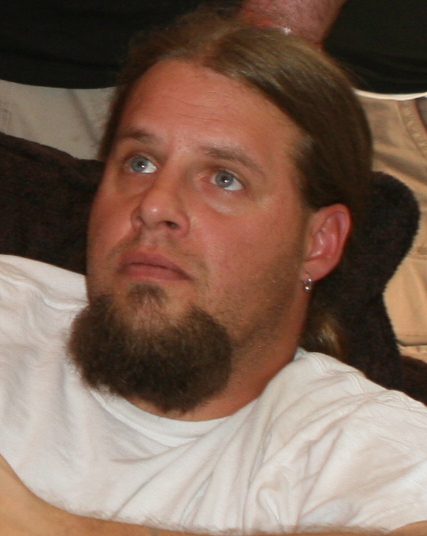
- Fehn in 2008

Background information
- Also known as: Mr. Zutzut: #3
- Born: February 24, 1973 (age 53)
- Genres: Alternative metal; nu metal; groove metal
- Occupation: Musician
- Instruments: Percussion; bass; drums
- Formerly of: Slipknot; Will Haven; Thunderbolt Gasoline; Shedd

Christopher Michael Fehn (born February 24, 1973) is an American musician. He was a percussionist and backing vocalist for the nu metal band Slipknot from 1998 to 2019, in which he was designated #3. He was also the bassist for Will Haven from 2010 to 2012.

== Career ==
=== Slipknot ===
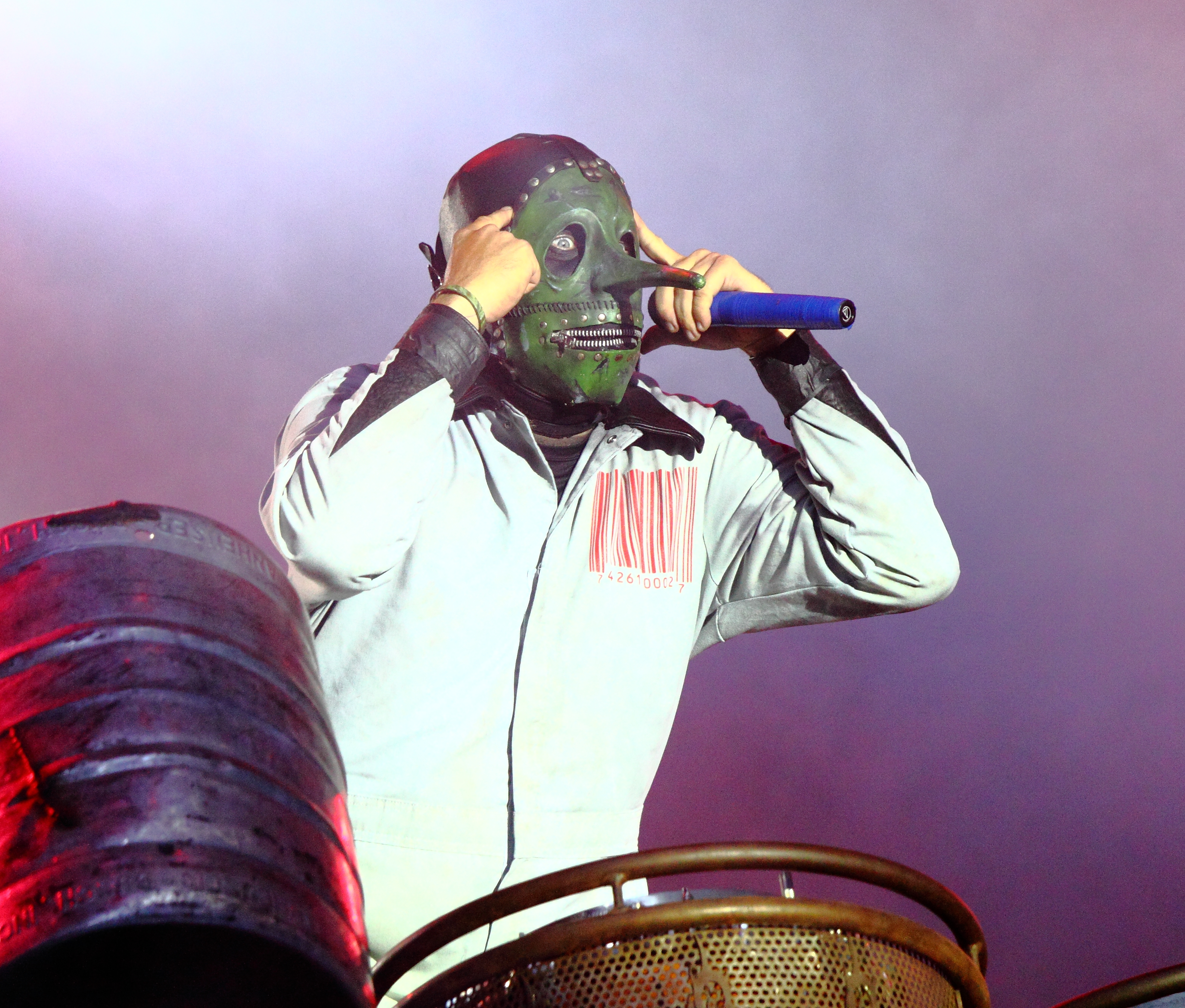
Fehn performing at Roskilde Festival with Slipknot, 2013

Fehn grew up in Ankeny, Iowa. Prior to joining Slipknot, he played as a kicker on the Wayne State College football team. Fehn joined the band around August (or September) 1998, replacing percussionist Brandon Darner.

As well as lending his percussion talents to the band, Fehn has also sung backing vocals on a number of songs Slipknot has both recorded and performed live. Fehn describes himself as a "big fan of the band" and says of Slipknot, "the world needed something like this."

In an interview with Face Culture, Fehn stated that the band members gave him a hard time during his early years with the group. He described that his time during the self-titled album era was his "hazing period."

Slipknot bassist Paul Gray stated in an interview that Fehn "often brings humor to the band," and that they "definitely need that guy." Fehn would wear a Pinocchio-style mask and would frequently stroke the nose as if he was masturbating. Prior to joining Slipknot in 1998, Fehn was close friends with Slipknot's percussionist Shawn Crahan. According to Fehn, he had originally asked Crahan if he could be drummer Joey Jordison's drum tech. Shortly after his request was made, Fehn was given an offer to play percussion in the band. Fehn was then given a rough demo that contained all of Slipknot's songs. Fehn has said that "Spit It Out" was the song that stood out to him the most. Fehn then tried out on percussion and was subsequently made part of Slipknot. Of the nine members, Fehn was the eighth to join the band.

His mask was featured in the movie Harold & Kumar Escape from Guantanamo Bay.

He was in the band Will Haven as bassist from 2010 to 2012.

On March 14, 2019, Fehn filed a lawsuit against Slipknot, citing payment being held back. Fehn specifically accused Corey Taylor and Shawn Crahan for what he felt was questionable business dealings.

On March 18, 2019, Fehn officially split with Slipknot following the filing of his lawsuit. However, a few days later, the message was removed from the website and according to Fehn's lawyer, the percussionist's employment status with the band had not changed since his initial filing.

== Personal life ==
In the early years of Slipknot before their signing with Roadrunner Records, Fehn was an electrician.

Fehn is of Norwegian ancestry.

Outside Slipknot, Fehn is a very keen golfer, and shown on an interview he did on the band's 2006 DVD, Voliminal: Inside the Nine, where he is interviewed at a golf course.

Fehn has two sons, born in 2012, and 2023.

Fehn has ornithophobia.

== Discography ==
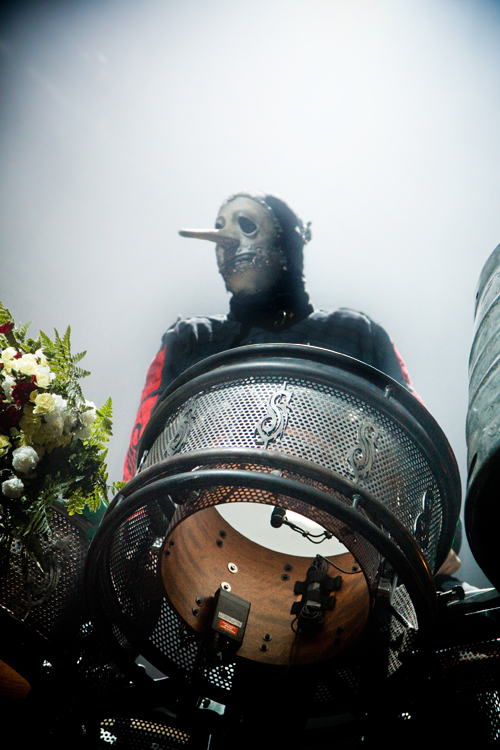
Fehn at Allstate Arena with Slipknot in 2009

=== with Slipknot ===
- Slipknot (1999)
- Iowa (2001)
- Vol. 3: (The Subliminal Verses) (2004)
- 9.0 Live (2005)
- All Hope Is Gone (2008)
- Antennas to Hell (2012)
- .5: The Gray Chapter (2014)
- Live at MSG (2023)

=== with Will Haven ===
- Voir Dire (2011)

=== Other appearances ===
- Phil Campbell – Old Lions Still Roar (2019) drums on "These Old Boots"

== Filmography ==
- 1999: Welcome to Our Neighborhood
- 2000: Slipknot: Generation Z
- 2002: Disasterpieces
- 2002: Rollerball
- 2003: Slipknot: Up to Our Necks
- 2006: Voliminal: Inside the Nine
- 2008: Nine: The Making of "All Hope Is Gone"
- 2009: Of the (sic): Your Nightmares, Our Dreams
- 2010: (sic)nesses
- 2013: Motionless in White – America (appears in the video as the freakshow host)
- 2016: Officer Downe
- 2017: Day of the Gusano: Live in Mexico

Preceded by Brandon Darner	Slipknot percussionist 1998–2019	Succeeded by Michael Pfaff
