= Craig Jones (musician) =

American musician (born 1972)

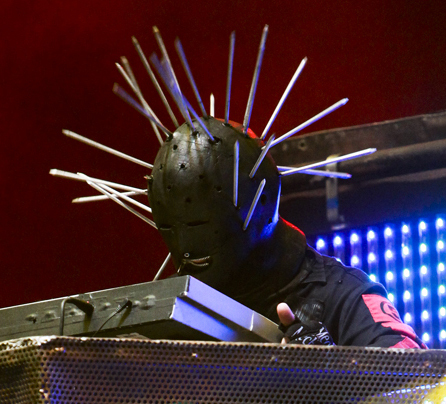
- Jones performing with Slipknot in 2009

Background information
- Also known as: 133 mhz; 133; #5; The Killer; The Quiet One; The Unabomber
- Born: Craig Alan Jones; February 11, 1972 (age 54); Iowa, U.S.
- Genres: Alternative metal; nu metal
- Occupation: Musician
- Instruments: Sampler; keyboards
- Years active: 1992–2023
- Formerly of: Slipknot, Modifidious

Craig Alan Jones (born February 11, 1972), also known as 133, is an American musician. He is the former sampler and keyboardist of the heavy metal band Slipknot, in which he was designated #5 amongst its nine member lineup. Jones joined the band in early 1996, shortly after the band had finished recording its demo album, Mate. Feed. Kill. Repeat.. Initially, he was brought in to replace Donnie Steele, one of the two original guitarists, though he moved on to sampling and keyboards. Following the departure of fellow bandmate and drummer Joey Jordison in 2013, Jones was the second-longest-serving member of Slipknot.

On June 7, 2023, Slipknot announced they parted ways with Jones, though the announcement was removed the same day.

== Career ==
Jones joined Slipknot in early 1996, replacing original guitarist Donnie Steele after the recording of the band's debut demo Mate. Feed. Kill. Repeat. He was enlisted to the band by drummer Joey Jordison, with whom Jones had previously worked (alongside guitarist Josh Brainard) in the band Modifidious. However, shortly after joining the band, the "electronics and computer genius" moved over to the role of sampler due to the increase in sound effects, background noises/programmed samples and media samples used in the band's music. Mick Thomson replaced him on guitar. Jordison claimed that Jones was happy with the change, noting that "he liked doing that anyway, coming up with all these noises and sounds". Jones' contribution to the band has been described by BBC Music as "provid[ing] samples, speeches and noises as a kind of audio garnish in the band's dark maelstrom".

Jones was given the nickname "133" as a reference to the processor speed of his computer, 133 MHz, which author Joel McIver claims "was considered the state of the art" at the time.

In September 2004, it was announced that Jones would not be performing with Slipknot for a short period of the band's European tour due to a "medical emergency". A statement on the band's official website explained that "Craig Jones #133 (#5) has been suffering incredible pain during the first week of our European tour and has been unable to eat or sleep properly. Therefore, a decision was made for him to return to the States for emergency dental surgery". Speaking about the situation, guitarist Jim Root explained that "We're filling his spot, we've got a picture of him in the dressing room and we miss him every day, [but] we couldn't cancel the tour".

It was announced on June 7, 2023, that Slipknot parted ways with Craig Jones.

== Mask ==
Upon joining the band as a guitarist, Jones initially wore women's pantyhose on his head when performing, which was said to give his face a "compressed, robber-like look". This was later changed to an astronaut space helmet with long nails hammered through it. The helmet was later replaced by a bondage mask, and a zipper was also added over the mouth area.

Along with those of Jordison, Root and Thomson, Jones' mask has been acknowledged by fans as having stayed very much consistent over the course of Slipknot's career. For the group's 2019 album We Are Not Your Kind, his mask was slightly modified, with the nails being replaced by screws and being longer at the top of the mask, achieving a mohawk effect.

== Personal life ==
Jones was often identified by the media as the most quiet and private member of Slipknot, earning him the nickname "The Quiet One". Vocalist Corey Taylor has commented on his demeanour by describing him as "the quietly scary type". Slipknot producer Ross Robinson has added that he "would try to get him to talk and he would just sit and stare at [him]". Loudwire's Graham Hartmann noted that he "almost never speaks" and "keeps people at a distance", theorizing that these qualities inspired the style of his mask. Ian Gittins of The Guardian described Jones as "patently a strange individual", as well as quoting the band's manager's dubbing of the sampler as "the Unabomber", a reference to Ted Kaczynski.

When asked early in his career about what job he might be working at if not in Slipknot, Jones responded that he'd likely be "driving forklifts in a warehouse all day long", although he has also joked that he would "probably be out killing people", which has earned him the nickname "The Killer". According to Robinson, the latter comment was the first the sampler made in an interview, and it inspired a number of complaints from readers of the publication to which it was made.

== Discography ==
=== With Slipknot ===
- Slipknot (1999)
- Iowa (2001)
- Vol. 3: (The Subliminal Verses) (2004)
- All Hope Is Gone (2008)
- .5: The Gray Chapter (2014)
- We Are Not Your Kind (2019)
- The End, So Far (2022)

=== Compilation albums ===
- Antennas to Hell (2012)

=== Video albums ===
- Welcome to Our Neighborhood (1999)
- Disasterpieces (2002)
- Voliminal: Inside the Nine (2006)
- Nine: The Making of "All Hope Is Gone" (2008)
- Of the (sic): Your Nightmares, Our Dreams (2009)
- (sic)nesses (2010)
- Goat (2011)
- Day of the Gusano: Live in Mexico (2017)

== Filmography ==
- Rollerball (2002)

Preceded by Donnie Steele	Slipknot guitarist 1996	Succeeded by Mick Thomson
Preceded by Anders Colsefni; Shawn Crahan	Slipknot sampler 1996–2023	Succeeded by none
