= The Nameless (song) =

2005 single by Slipknot

Single by Slipknot

from the album 9.0: Live
- Released: November 1, 2005
- Recorded: August 22, 2005
- Venue: House of Blues (Las Vegas)
- Length: 3:44
- Label: Roadrunner
- Songwriters: Shawn Crahan; Chris Fehn; Paul Gray; Craig Jones; Joey Jordison; Jim Root; Corey Taylor; Mick Thomson; Sid Wilson
- Producer: Joey Jordison

Slipknot singles chronology
"Before I Forget" (2005)	"The Nameless" (2005)	"The Blister Exists" (2006)

Music video
- "The Nameless" on YouTube

"The Nameless"

Song by Slipknot

from the album Vol. 3: (The Subliminal Verses)
- Released: May 25, 2004
- Length: 4:28
- Label: Roadrunner
- Songwriters: Shawn Crahan; Chris Fehn; Paul Gray; Craig Jones; Joey Jordison; Jim Root; Corey Taylor; Mick Thomson; Sid Wilson
- Producer: Rick Rubin

"The Nameless" is a song by American heavy metal band Slipknot from their third studio album, Vol. 3: (The Subliminal Verses). The song was also released a live single from their first live album, 9.0: Live. A music video was released for the single in late 2005 and also was featured on MTV's Rock Top 10 as number two.

== Musical structure ==
The song begins with a high-noted guitar riff, with mixed in samples, leading to the guitar notes getting lower, and lead vocalist Corey Taylor starting the lyrics with a scream. This eventually leads to low noted riffs with minor scales associated in. The song has a "basic minor-key riff," along with "thrash" riffs, and interludes that are much softer. The chorus is slow, emotional and epic. The song is in B minor, like many other Slipknot songs.

== Music video ==
Screenshot of "The Nameless" music video

The accompanying music video was directed by band member Shawn Crahan, who has also created and assisted with several of Slipknot's other videos.

The video depicts Slipknot performing live on their second headline tour The Subliminal Verses World Tour. It features various clips and shots of their fans during the concert. The video was directed by the band's co-founder and custom percussionist Shawn Crahan, and was featured on Voliminal: Inside the Nine, the band's third video album that was certified platinum by the RIAA. Many of the photos featured in 9.0: Live are seen in the video. At the end of the video, a caption says "Dedicated to all the Maggots [Slipknot fans] everywhere".

=== Promotion of 9.0: Live ===
Before the 9.0: Live's release, a sample from the live recording of "The Nameless" was made available on the Internet through the band's record label. A music video featuring the live recording of "The Nameless" was created to promote the album.

== Critical reception ==
Blender commented that "Relief from 'Prelude [3.0]' arrives quickly in the basic minor-key riffs and grooves of... 'The Nameless'..." Dan Silver from NME said "'The Nameless' intercuts thrash riffs with softly-strummed interludes". Robert Cherry of Rolling Stone said it "splices a cooing boy-band chorus onto a g-g-gunky speed metal verse". Yahoo!s Chris Heath said the song "confusingly stitches both extremes together – the ludicrously vicious and ridiculously placid – into one track that simply feels awkward, wrong even".

== Appearances on other albums ==
- "The Nameless" was featured in the album Promo only: Modern Rock Radio in 2005. The album is by various artists including System of a Down, OK Go, Fall Out Boy, and several others.
- It was also track number eight on Radioactive: Mainstream & Rock series in December 2005. The album features various artists that include many of the artists featured on Promo only: Modern Rock Radio.
- The song also appeared on The Scorched Earth Orchestra Performs Slipknot, an album produced by Noah Agruss and released on August 12, 2008. With nine other tracks, the tribute album released by Vitamin Records and includes covers of tracks from Slipknot's first three studio albums. The label's website enthuse that The Scorched Earth Orchestra "expand on Slipknot's marching-band-from-hell framework" with "booming percussion, in-your-face horns [and] string sections that rip at your flesh".

== Track listing ==
US Promo single
No.	Title	Lyrics	Arranger	Length
1.	"The Nameless" (Edit 1)	Corey Taylor	Slipknot	3:44
2.	"The Nameless" (Edit 2)	Corey Taylor	Slipknot	4:01

Netherlands Promo single
No.	Title	Lyrics	Arranger	Length
1.	"The Nameless" (Edit 1)	Corey Taylor	Slipknot	3:44
2.	"The Nameless" (Live)	Corey Taylor	Slipknot	4:44

Japan single
No.	Title	Lyrics	Arranger	Length
1.	"Prosthetics" (Live)	Slipknot	Slipknot	5:17
2.	"The Nameless" (Album version)	Corey Taylor	Slipknot	4:28
3.	"Before I Forget" (Molt-Injected mix)	Slipknot	Slipknot	4:40

Germany single
No.	Title	Lyrics	Arranger	Length
1.	"The Nameless" (Live)	Corey Taylor	Slipknot	3:44
2.	"The Nameless" (Enhanced video)	Corey Taylor	Slipknot	4:28

== Charts ==
Chart performance for "The Nameless"
Chart (2005)	Peak position
US Mainstream Rock (Billboard)	25
