= 9.0: Live =

Live album by Slipknot
- Released: November 1, 2005
- Recorded: 2004–2005
- Genre: Nu metal
- Length: 117:55
- Label: Roadrunner
- Producer: Slipknot

Slipknot chronology
Vol. 3: (The Subliminal Verses) (2004)	9.0: Live (2005)	All Hope Is Gone (2008)

Singles from 9.0: Live
- 1. "The Nameless" Released: November 1, 2005

9.0: Live is the first live album by American heavy metal band Slipknot. The band recorded the two-disc album during a 2004–05 world tour that promoted their third studio album Vol. 3: (The Subliminal Verses). Released on November 1, 2005, by Roadrunner Records, 9.0: Live features tracks from Slipknot's first three studio albums: Slipknot, Iowa, and Vol. 3: (The Subliminal Verses). Many of the included tracks are rarely played live; "Skin Ticket" from the album Iowa was its first live performance. 9.0: Live peaked in the top twenty in album sales for Austria and the United States, and was certified gold in the United States. Critical reception was generally positive, with Adrien Begrand of PopMatters calling it a "very worthy live album".

== Recording and production ==
While producing their second DVD Disasterpieces in 2002, the band members of Slipknot were inspired to produce a live album after noticing how well they performed when they knew they were being recorded. Two years later, in 2004, Slipknot promoted Vol. 3: (The Subliminal Verses) during a world tour which included 233 concerts across 34 countries in 28 months; music for the live album was recorded during the tour. The tracks on 9.0: Live were compiled from performances in Singapore, Tokyo, Osaka, Las Vegas, Phoenix, New York City, and Dallas.

Percussionist Shawn Crahan said the band made an effort to pay more attention to detail than usual during the tour, noting, "when you've got a microphone hanging onto your every note, you tend to give maybe 115 percent instead of 110 percent". The album begins with a staged vocal introduction which was recorded before a concert, informing the audience that the band would not be performing, in an effort to incite anger in the crowd. 9.0: Live includes tracks from the band's first three studio albums, and the banned track "Purity" which was removed from the band's debut album, Slipknot, due to copyright issues. It also contains tracks that are rarely played live, such as "Iowa" and "Get This", as well as the live debut of "Skin Ticket".

== Promotion ==
Before the album's release, a sample from the live recording of "The Nameless" was made available on the Internet through the band's record label. Slipknot attended a signing session at a Best Buy store in New York City the day of 9.0: Live's release, on November 1, 2005. A music video featuring the live recording of "The Nameless" was created to promote the album. Head of marketing at Roadrunner Records, Bob Johnsen, stated that the price of 9.0: Live was reduced in an effort to give "added value", resulting in the double-disc album being "two hours of music for the price of one". Johnsen continued, stating that as with most live albums, 9.0: Live targeted the "band's most hard-core fans. It's a complete immersion in the band". The album booklet includes 24 pages, most with pictures of band members.

== Reception ==
Professional ratings
Review scores
Source	Rating
AllMusic	4/5 stars
Blabbermouth.net	8/10
PopMatters	7/10
Rolling Stone	3/5 stars

Critical reception of 9.0: Live was generally positive. Reviewing for AllMusic, Johnny Loftus commented that the fans' relationship with Slipknot is "what unifies the performances" on the live album. He said that throughout the band's history, they have never compromised, and they had become "metal stars the real way, through relentless touring, embracing fan support, and penning some truly brutal songs". Rolling Stone's reviewer Christian Hoard wrote that the music featured on the album resembled a "new-school Motörhead", with its "scary-clown rap-metal bullshit getting steamrolled by big riffs and speed-punk beats". However, he noted the songs sounded similar to their recorded performances; Hoard called it the "songs' samey-ness". Adrien Begrand of PopMatters called 9.0: Live a "very worthy live album", and complimented the band for gaining success the "old-fashioned way, building a strong reputation as an extremely potent live act". Begrand noted the band's relationship with their "extremely devoted fans" as a strong point, and that the band's fans are "arguably the most fervently loyal bunch since the early days of Metallica two decades ago". However, he complained that it was distracting to have the band perform in a variety of undisclosed locations, rather than the one set throughout. Tom Day of MusicOMH wrote that the song "Before I Forget" is a "true gem and grinds out with a level of devastation that will make you green with envy if you weren't at these shows", and that drummer Joey Jordison took "centre stage" throughout the performance. Blair Fischer of the Chicago Tribune gave the album "three volume levels", writing, "The most amazing feat is that nine genetic defectives can congeal for such synchronous brain-damaged fury". Billboard reviewer Christa Titus wrote that Slipknot was "relentless in its delivery" of their live performances, calling the album "an overwhelming frenzy of sound and fury". Titus predicted the album would chart highly.

Some critics commented that the album is not as appealing to audiences who are unfamiliar with the band. Saul Austerlitz from The Boston Globe wrote that the album was "intended to cater primarily to rabid fans", commenting that those who are not fans of Slipknot will probably "find the experience of listening to both discs of 9.0: Live roughly comparable to being hit in the head repeatedly with a two-by-four two hours of sludgy, indistinguishable songs, punctuated by profane outbursts about how the idiot media [...] has ignored and abused them".

9.0: Live debuted at number 17 on the Billboard 200 charts in the United States, selling 42,000 copies in its first week. The album also premiered in the top 50 in five other countries. On December 9, 2005, the album was certified gold by the Recording Industry Association of America.

== Track listing ==
All songs credited to Slipknot and, as noted, were recorded live.

Disc one
No.	Title	Length
1.	"The Blister Exists" (Freeman Coliseum, San Antonio, TX, USA; April 1, 2005)	6:24
2.	"(sic)" (Freeman Coliseum, San Antonio, TX, USA; April 1, 2005)	3:52
3.	"Disasterpiece" (Nokia Theatre, Grand Prairie, TX, USA; April 2, 2005)	6:47
4.	"Before I Forget" (Glendale Arena, Glendale, Arizona, USA; April 6, 2005)	4:24
5.	"Left Behind" (Glendale Arena, Glendale, Arizona, USA; April 6, 2005)	3:44
6.	"Liberate" (Glendale Arena, Glendale, Arizona, USA; April 6, 2005)	3:48
7.	"Vermilion" (Glendale Arena, Glendale, Arizona, USA; April 6, 2005)	5:56
8.	"Pulse of the Maggots" (House of Blues, Las Vegas, USA; May 8, 2004)	5:06
9.	"Purity" (House of Blues, Las Vegas, USA; May 8, 2004)	5:12
10.	"Eyeless" (Fort Canning Park, Singapore, Singapore; August 16, 2005)	4:19
11.	"Drum Solo" (Fort Canning Park, Singapore, Singapore; August 16, 2005)	3:58
12.	"Eeyore" (Fort Canning Park, Singapore, Singapore; August 16, 2005)	2:16
Total length:		55:46

Disc two
No.	Title	Length
1.	"Three Nil" (House of Blues, Las Vegas, USA; May 8, 2004)	5:03
2.	"The Nameless" (House of Blues, Las Vegas, USA; August 22, 2005)	5:28
3.	"Skin Ticket" (House of Blues, Las Vegas, USA; August 22, 2005)	6:03
4.	"Everything Ends" (House of Blues, Las Vegas, USA; August 22, 2005)	5:03
5.	"The Heretic Anthem" (Glendale Arena, Glendale, Arizona, USA, April 6, 2005)	4:08
6.	"Iowa" (House of Blues, Las Vegas, USA; August 21, 2005)	6:37
7.	"Duality" (Continental Airlines Arena, East Rutherford, New Jersey, USA; March 6, 2005)	6:07
8.	"Spit It Out" (Continental Airlines Arena, East Rutherford, New Jersey, USA; March 6, 2005)	5:29
9.	"People = Shit" (Glendale Arena, Glendale, Arizona, USA; April 6, 2005)	5:53
10.	"Get This" (Glendale Arena, Glendale, Arizona, USA; April 6, 2005)	2:44
11.	"Wait and Bleed" (Glendale Arena, Glendale, Arizona, USA; April 6, 2005)	3:44
12.	"Surfacing" (Glendale Arena, Glendale, Arizona, USA; April 6, 2005)	5:50
Total length:		62:09

== Personnel ==
Aside from their real names, members of the band are referred to by numbers zero through eight.

Slipknot

- (#8) Corey Taylor – lead vocals
- (#7) Mick Thomson – guitars
- (#6) Shawn "Clown" Crahan – percussion, backing vocals
- (#5) Craig "133" Jones – samples, media, keyboards
- (#4) Jim Root – guitars
- (#3) Chris Fehn – percussion, backing vocals, co-lead vocals on "The Nameless"
- (#2) Paul Gray – bass, backing vocals
- (#1) Joey Jordison – drums
- (#0) Sid Wilson – turntables

Production

- Slipknot – production
- Joey Jordison – co-production
- Dave "Shirt" Nichols – recording
- Colin Richardson – mixing
- Matt Hyde – assistant mixing
- Ted Jensen – mastering

Artwork

- Slipknot – liner notes
- Shawn Crahan – art direction
- Michael Boland – design
- Shigeo Kikuchi – color image photography
- Eddie Sung – black and white images
- Ash Newell – back cover image

== Charts ==
Chart (2005)	Peak position
Australian Albums (ARIA)	26
Austrian Albums (Ö3 Austria)	18
Belgium Albums (Ultratop Flanders)	53
Belgium Albums (Ultratop Wallonia)	61
Canadian Albums (Nielsen SoundScan)	22
Dutch Albums (Album Top 100)	71
French Albums (SNEP)	41
German Albums (Offizielle Top 100)	24
Irish Albums (IRMA)	56
Italian Albums (FIMI)	68
Japanese Albums (Oricon)	23
Scottish Albums (OCC)	41
Swedish Albums (Sverigetopplistan)	40
Swiss Albums (Swiss Hitparade)	43
UK Albums (OCC)	53
US Billboard 200	17

== Certifications ==
Region	Certification	Certified units/sales
United States (RIAA)	Gold	500,000^{^}
^{^} Shipments figures based on certification alone.
