= The Subliminal Verses World Tour =

2004–05 concert tour by Slipknot

- World tour by Slipknot
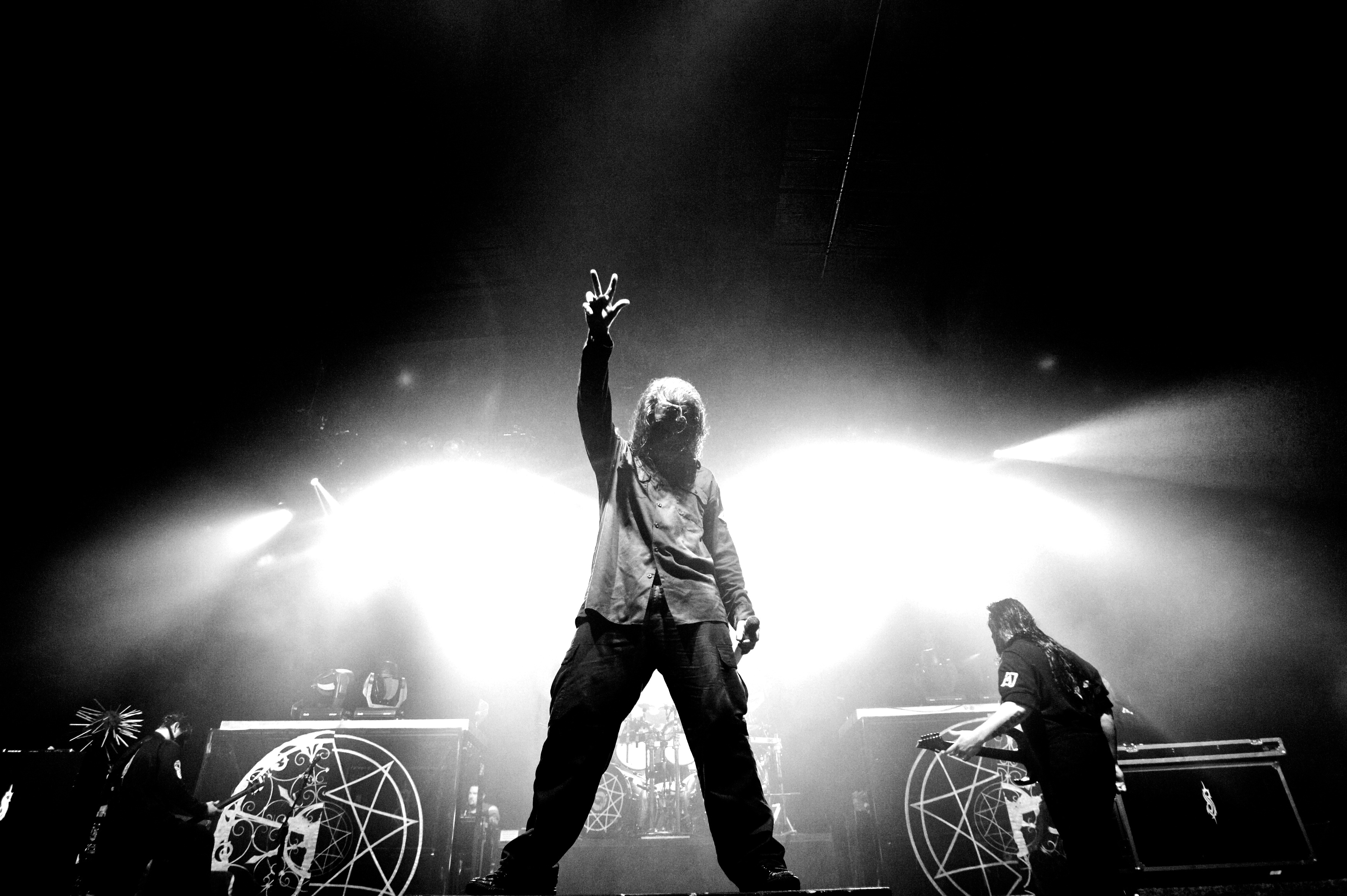
- Slipknot performing in Toronto (2005)
- Associated album: Vol. 3: (The Subliminal Verses); 9.0: Live
- Start date: March 30, 2004
- End date: November 15, 2005
- No. of shows: 233

Slipknot concert chronology
- Iowa World Tour (2001–2002); The Subliminal Verses World Tour (2004–2005) Jägermeister Music Tour (2004) Ozzfest Tour (2004); All Hope Is Gone World Tour (2008–2009)

The Subliminal Verses World Tour was a worldwide concert tour in 2004 and 2005 headlined by Slipknot in support of their third studio album Vol. 3: (The Subliminal Verses).

== Preparation ==
Before organizing the tour, Slipknot vocalist Corey Taylor commented that he was "probably the most vocal of the guys who really didn’t feel good coming back to Slipknot", and during the tour, he said that he was "basically eating my words, eating a lot of crow this time around. [... But] it's really good. [...] It's good to be humbled and know you’re in a band that's fantastic."

During the tour, the band's third studio album Vol. 3: (The Subliminal Verses) was approaching the platinum mark, and two of its tracks were nominated for the year's Grammy Awards ("Duality" for Best Hard Rock Performance and "Vermilion" for Best Heavy Metal Performance).

== Performers ==
As is typical of the band, Slipknot members are masked and costumed when performing on stage. They received support at various stages of the tour from Fear Factory, Chimaira, Hatebreed and Shadows Fall. Slipknot also played as support to Metallica and Slayer.

The band Lamb of God also performed on the tour. When the tour arrived in Los Angeles on April 9, 2005 to perform at The Forum, Lamb of God was banned from opening for Slipknot because the church that owned the venue did not appreciate the band's old name of Burn the Priest.

== Set list ==
2004
- "(sic)"
- "The Blister Exists"
- "Eyeless"
- "Three Nil"
- "Disasterpiece"
- "Duality"
- "Purity / Vermilion"
- "Pulse of the Maggots"
- "Iowa"
- "The Heretic Anthem"
- "Spit It Out"
- "Wait and Bleed"

-Encore-

- "People = Shit"
- "Surfacing"
Note: The following songs were played occasionally- "Left Behind", "Eeyore"
2005
- "Prelude 3.0"
- "The Blister Exists"
- "(sic)"
- "Disasterpiece"
- "Before I Forget"
- "Left Behind"
- "Liberate"
- "Vermilion"
- "Pulse of the Maggots"
- "The Nameless"
- "Iowa"
- "The Heretic Anthem"
- "Everything Ends"
- "Duality"
- "Spit It Out"
- "People = Shit"

-Encore-

- "Get This"
- "Wait and Bleed"
- "Surfacing"

Notes: The following songs were played occasionally- "Eyeless", "Three Nil".

"Skin Ticket" was played once at the House of Blues, Las Vegas.

== Tour dates ==
Date	City	Country	Venue
Asia With: Korn, Evanescence, Rancid and others
January 31, 2004	Osaka	Japan	~~Sonicmania Festival~~ (cancelled)
February 1, 2004	Tokyo	Japan	~~Sonicmania Festival~~ (cancelled)
February 3, 2004	Seoul	South Korea	~~Jamsil Arena~~ (cancelled)
Jägermeister Music Tour 2004 Supported by: Fear Factory and Chimaira
March 30, 2004	Hollywood	United States	Hard Rock Live
March 31, 2004	West Palm Beach	United States	Sound Advice Amphitheater
April 2, 2004	Birmingham	United States	Sloss Furnaces
April 3, 2004	Atlanta	United States	The Tabernacle
April 4, 2004	North Myrtle Beach	United States	House of Blues
April 6, 2004	Winston-Salem	United States	Millennium Center
April 8, 2004	Norfolk	United States	Norva Theatre
April 9, 2004	Washington, D.C.	United States	Nation
April 10, 2004	Worcester	United States	The Palladium
April 12, 2004	New York City	United States	Roseland Ballroom
April 13, 2004	Philadelphia	United States	Electric Factory
April 14, 2004	Rochester	United States	ESL Sports Center
April 16, 2004	Detroit	United States	Harpos
April 17, 2004	Cleveland	United States	Tower City Amphitheater
April 18, 2004	Columbus	United States	Promowest Pavilion
April 20, 2004	Grand Rapids	United States	The Orbit Room
April 22, 2004	Saint Paul	United States	Roy Wilkins Auditorium
April 23, 2004	Chicago	United States	Congress Theater
April 24, 2004	Milwaukee	United States	Eagles Auditorium
April 26, 2004	Kansas City	United States	Memorial Hall
April 27, 2004	Des Moines	United States	Val Air Ballroom
April 28, 2004	St. Louis	United States	The Pageant
April 30, 2004	Houston	United States	Verizon Wireless Theater
May 1, 2004	Grand Prairie	United States	NextStage at Grand Prairie
May 2, 2004	Oklahoma City	United States	Bricktown Events Center
May 4, 2004	Denver	United States	The Fillmore
May 5, 2004	Salt Lake City	United States	The Venue
May 7, 2004	Mesa	United States	Mesa Amphitheatre
May 8, 2004	Paradise	United States	House of Blues – Mandalay Bay
May 9, 2004	San Diego	United States	Soma San Diego
May 11, 2004	Los Angeles	United States	Universal Amphitheatre
May 13, 2004	San Francisco	United States	The Regency Center
May 14, 2004	Sacramento	United States	Sacramento Memorial Auditorium
May 14, 2004	Los Angeles	United States	AOL Sessions
May 17, 2004	Burbank	United States	Tonight Show With Jay Leno
May 21, 2004	New York City	United States	Fuse IMX TV Show
Metallica European Open Air Tour 2004 and Festival
May 24, 2004	London	England	Radio One Rockshow Sessions
May 24, 2004	London	England	London Astoria
May 26, 2004	Copenhagen	Denmark	Parken
May 28, 2004	Helsinki	Finland	Olympic Stadium
May 30, 2004	Gothenburg	Sweden	Ullevi
May 31, 2004	Chorzów	Poland	Stadion Slaski
June 2, 2004	Glasgow	Scotland	Glasgow Green, Download Scotland
June 4, 2004	Lisbon	Portugal	Parque Bella Vista Rock in Rio
June 6, 2004	Donington	England	Donington Park, Download
June 8, 2004	Ludwigshafen	Germany	Südweststadion
June 10, 2004	Gelsenkirchen	Germany	Arena Auf Schalke
June 11, 2004	Vienna	Austria	Wiener Neustadt Aerodrome '04
June 12, 2004	Budapest	Hungary	Sport Sziget
June 13, 2004	Munich	Germany	Olympic Stadium
June 16, 2004	Bremen	Germany	Weserstadion
June 18, 2004	Zürich	Switzerland	Letzegrund Stadium
June 19, 2004	Zaragoza	Spain	La Romareda Stadium
June 21, 2004	Amsterdam	Netherlands	Amsterdam Arena
June 23, 2004	Paris	France	Parcs des Princes
June 25, 2004	Dublin	Ireland	RDS Arena
June 26, 2004	Dessel	Belgium	Graspop Metal Meeting
June 27, 2004	Le Mans	France	Fury Festival
June 29, 2004	Padova	Italy	Padova Stadium
July 1, 2004	Prague	Czech Republic	T-Mobile Park
July 2, 2004	Roskilde	Denmark	Roskilde Festival
July 2, 2004	Leipzig	Germany	With Full Force Festival
July 4, 2004	Belfort	France	Eurockéennes de Belfort
July 6, 2004	Kristiansand	Norway	Quart Festival
Ozzfest 2004 With: Ozzy Osbourne, Judas Priest, Slayer and others
July 10, 2004	Hartford	United States	Meadows Music
July 11, 2004	Augusta	United States	Augusta Civic Center
July 12, 2004	Mansfield	United States	Tweeter Center
July 14, 2004	Wantagh	United States	Jones Beach Amphitheatre
July 16, 2004	Holmdel Township	United States	PNC Bank Arts Center
July 17, 2004	Glens Falls	United States	Glens Falls Civic Center
July 18, 2004	Bristow	United States	Nissan Pavilion
July 20, 2004	Columbus	United States	Germain Amphitheater
July 21, 2004	Peoria	United States	Peoria Civic Center
July 22, 2004	Antioch	United States	Starwood Amphitheatre
July 24, 2004	Greenwood Village	United States	Fiddler's Green Amphitheatre
July 27, 2004	Auburn	United States	White River Amphitheatre
July 28, 2004	St. Helens	United States	Columbia Meadows
July 29, 2004	Mountain View	United States	Shoreline Amphitheatre
July 30, 2004	Los Angeles	United States	Jimmy Kimmel Live!
July 31, 2004	San Bernardino	United States	Hyundai Pavilion
August 2, 2004	Tucson	United States	Tucson Convention Center
August 3, 2004	Albuquerque	United States	Journal Pavilion
August 5, 2004	Dallas	United States	Smirnoff Amphitheatre
August 6, 2004	Lubbock	United States	Canyon Amphitheatre
August 7, 2004	Selma	United States	Verizon Wireless Amphitheater
August 9, 2004	Little Rock	United States	Riverfest Amphitheatre
August 10, 2004	Bonner Springs	United States	Verizon Wireless Amphitheatre
August 12, 2004	Maryland Heights	United States	UMB Bank Pavilion
August 13, 2004	Cedar Rapids	United States	U.S. Cellular Center
August 14, 2004	East Troy	United States	Alpine Valley Music Theatre
August 17, 2004	Clarkston	United States	DTE Energy Music Theatre
August 18, 2004	Kanata	Canada	Corel Centre
August 19, 2004	Cuyahoga Falls	United States	Blossom Music Center
August 21, 2004	Tinley Park	United States	Tweeter Center Chicago
August 24, 2004	Noblesville	United States	Verizon Wireless Music Center
August 26, 2004	Camden	United States	Tweeter Center
August 27, 2004	Corfu	United States	Darien Lake Performing Arts Center
August 28, 2004	Burgettstown	United States	Star Lake
August 29, 2004	Virginia Beach	United States	Verizon Wireless Music Center
August 31, 2004	Raleigh	United States	Alltel Pavilion at Walnut Creek
September 1, 2004	North Charleston	United States	The Plex
September 2, 2004	Tampa	United States	Tampa Bay Amphitheatre
The Unholy Alliance Tour 2004 Co-headlining with: Slayer and supported by Hatebreed
September 22, 2004	Geneva	Switzerland	Arena
September 23, 2004	Milan	Italy	Mazda Palace
September 25, 2004	Dresden	Germany	Messehalle
September 26, 2004	Berlin	Germany	Arena
September 27, 2004	Munich	Germany	Zenith
September 29, 2004	Böblingen	Germany	Sporthalle
September 30, 2004	Düsseldorf	Germany	Philipshalle
October 1, 2004	Leuven	Belgium	Brabanthal
October 3, 2004	Glasgow	Scotland	SECC
October 5, 2004	Birmingham	England	National Indoor Arena
October 6, 2004	Manchester	England	Manchester Evening News Arena
October 8, 2004	Cardiff	Wales	Cardiff International Arena
October 9, 2004	London	England	Hammersmith Apollo
October 10, 2004	London	England	Hammersmith Apollo
October 13, 2004	Gothenburg	Sweden	Scandinavium
October 14, 2004	Stockholm	Sweden	Hovet
October 15, 2004	Oslo	Norway	Spektrum
October 17, 2004	Helsinki	Finland	Ice Hall
October 19, 2004	Copenhagen	Denmark	Valbyhallen
October 21, 2004	Rotterdam	Netherlands	Ahoy
October 23, 2004	Paris	France	Palais Omnisports de Paris-Bercy
October 30, 2004	Tokyo	Japan	Makuhari Messe
October 31, 2004	Tokyo	Japan	Makuhari Messe
November 1, 2004	Nagoya	Japan	Aichi Prefectural Gymnasium
November 2, 2004	Osaka	Japan	Osaka-jo Hall
November 4, 2004	Fukuoka	Japan	Zepp Fukuoka
November 7, 2004	Seoul	South Korea	Olympic Gymnastics Arena
November 10, 2004	Bangkok	Thailand	Activ Square
Canada 2005 With: Killswitch Engage, Unearth
January 7, 2005	Quebec City	Canada	Centre du Foire
January 8, 2005	Montreal	Canada	Jarry Indoor Tennis
January 9, 2005	Mississauga	Canada	International Centre
January 12, 2005	Saskatoon	Canada	Credit Union Centre
January 13, 2005	Calgary	Canada	Calgary Stampede Corral
January 14, 2005	Edmonton	Canada	Shaw Conference Centre
January 16, 2005	Vancouver	Canada	PNE Forum
Big Day Out 2005 With: System of a Down, Beastie Boys, Hatebreed and other
January 21, 2005	Auckland	New Zealand	Ericsson Stadium
January 23, 2005	Gold Coast	Australia	Gold Coast Parklands
January 24, 2005	Brisbane	Australia	Brisbane Convention Centre
January 26, 2005	Sydney	Australia	Sydney Showground
January 29, 2005	Sydney	Australia	Hordern Pavilion
January 30, 2005	Ascot Vale	Australia	RAS Showground
February 2, 2005	Melbourne	Australia	The Palace
February 4, 2005	Wayville	Australia	Adelaide Showgrounds
February 6, 2005	Claremont	Australia	Claremont Showground
The Subliminal Verses World Tour 2005 Supported by: Lamb of God, Shadows Fall
March 4, 2005	Hartford	United States	Meadows Music Theater
March 5, 2005	Philadelphia	United States	Wachovia Spectrum
March 6, 2005	East Rutherford	United States	Continental Airlines Arena
March 8, 2005	San Jose	United States	SAP Center
March 9, 2005	Cleveland	United States	CSU Convocation Center
March 11, 2005	Rosemont	United States	Allstate Arena
March 12, 2005	Detroit	United States	Cobo Arena
March 13, 2005	Indianapolis	United States	Conseco Fieldhouse
March 15, 2005	Lowell	United States	Paul E. Tsongas Arena
March 16, 2005	Fairfax	United States	Patriot Center
March 18, 2005	Hampton	United States	Hampton Coliseum
March 19, 2005	Atlanta	United States	HiFi Buys Amphitheater
March 20, 2005	Pensacola	United States	Pensacola Civic Center
March 22, 2005	West Palm Beach	United States	Sound Advice Amphitheater
March 23, 2005	Tampa	United States	USF Sun Dome
March 25, 2005	New Orleans	United States	UNO Lakefront Arena
March 26, 2005	Houston	United States	Reliant Arena
March 28, 2005	Oklahoma City	United States	Fairgrounds Arena
March 29, 2005	Valley Center	United States	Kansas Coliseum
March 31, 2005	Corpus Christi	United States	Concrete Street Amphitheatre
April 1, 2005	San Antonio	United States	Freeman Coliseum
April 2, 2005	Grand Prairie	United States	Nokia Live
April 4, 2005	Albuquerque	United States	Albuquerque Convention Center
April 5, 2005	El Paso	United States	El Paso County Coliseum
April 6, 2005	Glendale	United States	Glendale Arena
April 8, 2005	San Diego	United States	Cox Arena
April 9, 2005	Inglewood	United States	The Forum
April 10, 2005	Fresno	United States	Selland Arena
April 12, 2005	San Jose	United States	HP Pavilion at San Jose
April 13, 2005	Sacramento	United States	ARCO Arena
April 15, 2005	Portland	United States	Portland Memorial Coliseum
April 16, 2005	Tacoma	United States	Tacoma Dome
April 17, 2005	Spokane	United States	~~Star Theater~~ (cancelled)
April 19, 2005	West Valley City	United States	~~E-Center~~ (cancelled)
April 20, 2005	Denver	United States	Magness Arena
April 22, 2005	Kansas City	United States	City Market
April 23, 2005	Ames	United States	Hilton Coliseum
April 24, 2005	Saint Paul	United States	Xcel Energy Center
April 26, 2005	Ashwaubenon	United States	Resch Center
April 27, 2005	Springfield	United States	Prairie Capital Convention Center
April 29, 2005	Council Bluffs	United States	Mid-America Center
April 30, 2005	Madison	United States	Alliant Energy Center
May 27, 2005	Vienna	Austria	Aerodrome Festival
May 30, 2005	Athens	Greece	Lycabetus Theatre
June 2, 2005	Bologna	Italy	Flippaut Festival
June 3, 2005	Nürburgring	Germany	Rock Am Ring
June 4, 2005	Nuremberg	Germany	Rock im Park
June 6, 2005	Amsterdam	Netherlands	Paradiso
June 8, 2005	Glasgow	Scotland	Barrowlands
June 10, 2005	Dublin	Ireland	RDS Simmonscourt
June 12, 2005	Donington Park	England	Download Festival
June 13, 2005	London	England	Astoria
June 14, 2005	Copenhagen	Denmark	K.B. Hallen
June 15, 2005	Oslo	Norway	Rockefeller Music Hall
June 16, 2005	Hultsfred	Sweden	Hultsfred Festival
June 18, 2005	Seinajoki	Finland	Provinssirock
June 20, 2005	Warsaw	Poland	Klub Stodola
June 22, 2005	Lyon	France	Halle Tony Garnier
June 23, 2005	Nancy	France	Zenith
June 24, 2005	Bex	Switzerland	Bexrock Festival
June 25, 2005	Dessel	Belgium	Graspop Metal Meeting
August 13, 2005	Tokyo	Japan	Summer Sonic Festival: Chiba Marine Stadium
August 14, 2005	Osaka	Japan	Summer Sonic Festival: WTC Open Air Stadium
August 16, 2005	Singapore	Singapore	Fort Canning Park
August 20, 2005	San Bernardino	United States	Hyundai Pavilion at Glen Helen
August 21, 2005	Paradise	United States	House of Blues – Mandalay Bay
August 22, 2005	Paradise	United States	House of Blues – Mandalay Bay
South American Tour 2005 Supported by: As I Lay Dying, Koyi k utho, Candy 66 and Unearth
September 18, 2005	Bogotá	Colombia	Simón Bolívar Park
September 20, 2005	Caracas	Venezuela	Poliedro de Caracas
September 23, 2005	São Paulo	Brazil	Skol Arena
September 25, 2005	Rio de Janeiro	Brazil	Claro Hall
September 27, 2005	Santiago	Chile	Velodrome
September 29, 2005	Buenos Aires	Argentina	Obras Sanitarias
September 30, 2005	Buenos Aires	Argentina	Obras Sanitarias
Subliminal Verses Tour: The Final Volume 2005 Supported by: As I Lay Dying and Unearth Jim Root missed the whole last part of the tour due to a broken wrist. Mick Thomson was the only guitarist during this time
October 14, 2005	Cincinnati	United States	U.S. Bank Arena
October 15, 2005	Grand Rapids	United States	DeltaPlex Arena
October 16, 2005	Cleveland	United States	House of Blues
October 18, 2005	Chicago	United States	Congress Theater
October 19, 2005	Chicago	United States	Congress Theater
October 21, 2005	Moline	United States	The Mark
October 22, 2005	Kansas City	United States	Freaker's Ball
October 24, 2005	Detroit	United States	State Theatre
October 25, 2005	Toronto	Canada	Air Canada Centre
October 27, 2005	Philadelphia	United States	~~Electric Factory~~ (first date cancelled, second date rescheduled)
October 28, 2005	Philadelphia	United States	~~Electric Factory~~ (first date cancelled, second date rescheduled)
October 30, 2005	New York City	United States	~~Nokia Theater~~ (cancelled)
October 31, 2005	New York City	United States	~~Nokia Theater~~ (cancelled)
November 1, 2005	New York City	United States	~~Nokia Theater~~ (cancelled)
November 3, 2005	Lewiston	United States	~~Central Maine Civic Center~~ (cancelled)
November 4, 2005	Montreal	Canada	Bell Centre
November 5, 2005	Quebec City	Canada	Colisée Pepsi
November 7, 2005	Worcester	United States	The Palladium
November 8, 2005	Worcester	United States	~~The Palladium~~ (cancelled)
November 8, 2005	Philadelphia	United States	Electric Factory
November 9, 2005	Atlantic City	United States	House of Blues
November 11, 2005	Evansville	United States	Roberts Municipal Stadium
November 12, 2005	Rockford	United States	MetroCentre
November 13, 2005	Saint Paul	United States	Roy Wilkins Auditorium
November 15, 2005	Milwaukee	United States	Eagles Ballroom
