= (sic)nesses =

Video by Slipknot
- Released: September 28, 2010
- Recorded: June 13, 2009
- Length: 87:28 (concert only); 40:31 (audible visions of (sic)nesses)
- Label: Roadrunner
- Directors: Shawn Crahan; Ruary Macphie; John Probyn; P. R. Brown
- Producers: Neil Zaugg; Mike Kaufman

Slipknot chronology
Voliminal: Inside the Nine (2006)	(sic)nesses (2010)

(sic)nesses is the fourth video album by American heavy metal band Slipknot. It was released on September 28, 2010 by Roadrunner Records. The double-disc release features a recording of their headlining performance at the 2009 Download Festival, along with a 45-minute behind the scenes documentary created by percussionist Shawn Crahan, and the four music videos from All Hope Is Gone. It is the band's first release since the death of the band's former bassist Paul Gray and is dedicated in his memory. On September 22, 2010, (sic)nesses premiered in select theaters across the United States. Entrance to the screenings were free and it included free giveaways. Reception was generally positive, with Artistdirect rewarding the album a perfect five out of five stars, and Blabbermouth.net giving the album eight and a half out of ten stars. The album peaked at number one on four charts: the Australian Top 40 Music DVD Chart, the Finland Top 10 Music DVDs, the UK Top 10 Music DVD Chart, and the US Top Music Video Chart.

== Recording and production ==
(sic)nesses was recorded when Slipknot headlined the Download Festival in front of 80,000 fans on June 13, 2009. The show at Donington Park was filmed with 30 cameras. The 45-minute film audible visions of (sic)nesses features Slipknot during and in-between gigs on the All Hope Is Gone World Tour. Shawn Crahan stated that, "Going in and filming this, it just seemed like there was no way it could fail. It was going to be in the top five best shows of our careers, and that's basically what it was: we got off the stage and all nine of us felt the same thing, we knew that we destroyed 80,000 people. Watching it back just brings tears to my eyes".

The DVD was released as a dedication to the band's former bassist Paul Gray, who died of an accidental drug overdose on May 24, 2010. Roadrunner Records said the following about the DVD's release: "It makes perfect sense that the band...would release (sic)nesses...All Slipknot shows are memorable, but this one is particularly memorable, as the band blasted through hits from all of their Platinum albums. On stage is Slipknot in its most natural state and (sic)nesses will put you in the front row."

The live performance of "Psychosocial" was premiered on MSN in mid-September. The DVD premiered in a collection of theaters across the United States on September 22, 2010, prior to its commercial release. Screenings included Grauman's Chinese Theatre, Carmike Cinemas, Krikorian Theaters, Rave Motion Pictures, UltraStar Cinemas, Studio Movie Grill, Bow Tie, Santikos Theatres, Alamo Drafthouse Cinema, Emagine Entertainment, Cleveland Cinemas, Cinema Café and the Regent Theater. Crahan attended the New York event on September 27 as part of the promotion. Viewings were free and several prizes were given away randomly throughout the night at all three events. Crahan stated that "(sic)nesses was one of the single hardest pieces of art for us to complete, given the circumstances..." It was mixed at Miloco Studios in London, England, and mastered at Sterling Sound in New York.

== Reception ==
The album's reception was generally positive. The album's description on Roadrunnerrecords.com stated: "The performance was absolutely electric, in typical Slipknot fashion, especially since it came hot on the heels of one of the strongest years in Slipknot's illustrious career." Scott Alisoglu from Blabbermouth.net gave the album eight and a half out of ten stars. He called it the "ultimate tribute" to bassist Paul Gray. He also noted that things like display of controlled echos, the 80,000 person audience, their energetic performances of songs from their first album, and the "unforgettable anthems" like "Before I Forget" and "Psychosocial" came together to "remind naysayers and fans alike that Slipknot has a dearth of rivals when it comes to live performance". In its first week, the album sold 9,300 copies in the United States.

== Contents ==
The DVD's contents can be verified from the band's official website and the album's notes. A Blu-ray version was released on July 31, 2012.

=== Disc one ===
Short film

- Audible visions of (sic)nesses– a 40 minute film directed by M. Shawn Crahan
- "Paul Gray Tribute"

=== Disc two ===
Live performances recorded at the 2009 Download Festival

1. "742617000027"
2. "(sic)"
3. "Eyeless"
4. "Wait and Bleed"
5. "Get This"
6. "Before I Forget"
7. "Sulfur"
8. "The Blister Exists"
9. "Dead Memories"
10. "Left Behind"
11. "Disasterpiece"
12. "Vermilion"
13. "Everything Ends"
14. "Psychosocial"
15. "Duality"
16. "People=Shit"
17. "Surfacing"
18. "Spit It Out"

Music videos

1. "Psychosocial"
2. "Dead Memories"
3. "Sulfur"
4. "Snuff"

Making of

1. "Snuff"

== Personnel ==
Aside from their legal names, members of the band are referred to by numbers zero through eight. The following personnel can be verified by the album's notes.

Slipknot

- (#0) Sid Wilson – turntables
- (#1) Joey Jordison – drums
- (#2) Paul Gray – bass, backing vocals
- (#3) Chris Fehn – percussion, backing vocals
- (#4) Jim Root – guitars
- (#5) Craig Jones – samples, media, keyboards
- (#6) Shawn Crahan – percussion, backing vocals
- (#7) Mick Thomson – guitars
- (#8) Corey Taylor – vocals

Production team

- Monte Conner – A&R
- P.R. Brown – director of music videos, photography
- Shawn Crahan – co-director of "Snuff" and audible Vision of (sic)nesses, artwork, photography
- Ruary Macphie – director of Concert
- John Probyn – director of Download Festival
- Neil Zaugg – producer
- Mike Kaufman – concert producer
- Ted Jensen – concert audio mastering
- Colin Richardson – concert audio mixing
- Martyn "Ginge" Ford – concert audio mixing
- Michael Rossow – authoring
- Jarrad Hearman – assistant concert audio mixing
- Ryan Martin – DVD Audio Interface engineer
- Bobby Tongs – cinematography of audible visions of (sic)nesses, photography
- Scott Kaven – cinematography of audible visions of (sic)nesses
- Lora Richardson – co-ordination
- Cory Brennan – management
- Jaison John – management assistant
- Scott Kaven – DVD Design
- Michael Boland – Sleeve Design
- Andy Copping – Download Festival promoter
- John Jackson – booking
- Rick Roskin – booking

== Charts ==
Chart	Position
Australian Top 40 Music DVD Chart	1
Finland Top10 Music DVDs	1
German Music DVD Top-20	3
New Zealand Music DVD Chart	3
UK Top10 Music DVD Chart	1
US Top Music Video Chart	1

== Certifications ==
Region	Certification	Certified units/sales
Australia (ARIA)	Platinum	15,000^{^}
United States (RIAA)	Platinum	100,000^{^}
^{^} Shipments figures based on certification alone.
