= Behind the Player: Paul Gray =

Behind The Player: Paul Gray

Video by Paul Gray
- Released: November 1, 2008
- Length: 72 mins
- Label: IMV
- Director: Leon Melas
- Producer: Ken Mayer & Sean E DeMott

Behind The Player: Paul Gray is an instructional video by Slipknot's late bassist, Paul Gray. Released on November 1, 2008 through IMV the DVD features a brief overview of Gray's musical history, in-depth lessons on how to play bass for two Slipknot songs, as well as other bonus material. Gray gives a walk through of the bass sections for the tracks "Duality" and "Surfacing"; there is also a jam session which features Stone Sour drummer Roy Mayorga and a video tab for both tracks.

== Contents ==
Behind The Player

Gray talks about his background in music including his history as a guitar player and a bassist, how he met the other members of Slipknot, his musical influences and his bass setup.

"Duality"

- Lesson
- Jam
- Video tab

"Surfacing"

- Lesson
- Jam
- Video tab

Special features

- Voliminal: Inside the Nine trailer
- Disasterpieces trailer
- Little Kids Rock promotional video

== Personnel ==
- Paul Gray - lesson leader
- Roy Mayorga - special guest drummer
- Slipknot - music
- Ken Mayer - producer
- Sean E DeMott - producer
- Leon Melas - director
- Rick Donaleshen - executive producer
- Ken Barrows - director of photography
- Tim Harkins - sound engineer
- Jeff Morose - editor
- Matt Chidgey - mixer
- Cedrick Courtois - mixer
- Thayer DeMay - graphics, transcription
- Mike Chateneuf - camera
- Keith McNulty - camera
- Chris Shaw - camera
- Doug Cragoe - camera
- Tyler Bourns - technical director
- John Parker - gaffer
- Matt Pick - assistant director
- Laine Proctor - production assistant
- McNulty Nielson - lighting, grip
- Shawn Crahan - photography, video
- Neil Zlozower - photography
- Gene Kirkland - photography
- Arthur Seay - photography
- Roxanne Robinson - photography
- Dean Karr - photography
- James Clynes - photography
- Roadrunner Records - video
- Daryl “B.Tongs” Arnberger - video
- Arthur Seay - video
- Bill Fold - video
- Joe Lester - video
- James Clynes - video
