= Vol. 3: (The Subliminal Verses) =

Studio album by Slipknot
- Released: May 25, 2004
- Recorded: July 2003 – January 2004
- Studios: The Mansion in Laurel Canyon, Los Angeles, California; Akademie Mathematique of Philosophical Sound Research and Sound City in Los Angeles
- Genres: Nu metal; alternative metal
- Length: 60:09
- Label: Roadrunner
- Producer: Rick Rubin

Slipknot chronology
Iowa (2001)	''Vol. 3: (The Subliminal Verses)'' (2004)	9.0: Live (2005)

Slipknot studio album chronology
Iowa (2001)	Vol. 3: (The Subliminal Verses) (2004)	All Hope Is Gone (2008)

Singles from Vol. 3: (The Subliminal Verses)
- 1. "Duality" Released: May 4, 2004; 2. "Vermilion" Released: October 5, 2004; 3. "Before I Forget" Released: March 8, 2005; 4. "The Blister Exists" Released: January 24, 2006

Alternative cover
- Special edition cover

Vol. 3: (The Subliminal Verses) is the third studio album by American heavy metal band Slipknot, released on May 25, 2004, by Roadrunner Records. A special edition, containing a bonus disc, was released on April 12, 2005. It is the band's only album produced by Rick Rubin. Following the band's tour to promote its second album in 2002, speculation regarding the future began. Some band members had already been involved in side projects including Murderdolls, To My Surprise, and the reformation of Stone Sour. In 2003, Slipknot moved into The Mansion to work on the album. Initially, the band was unproductive; lead vocalist Corey Taylor was drinking heavily. Nevertheless, the band managed to write more than enough material for a new album. Regarded as a swan song of the late 1990s to early 2000s era of nu metal, Vol. 3 is credited as Slipknot's first to incorporate more traditional, melodic song structures, guitar solos and acoustic instruments.

The album received generally positive reviews. Slipknot was praised by AllMusic for its "dedication to making it a Slipknot album", while Q added that the album was "a triumph". The album peaked within the top ten in album sales across eleven countries, and went Platinum in the United States. The band also received the Grammy Award for Best Metal Performance for the song "Before I Forget". At the end of 2009, "Before I Forget" was listed as "AOL's Top Metal Song of the Decade". Roadrunner Records have listed the music video for "Duality" as the best music video in Roadrunner history.

In 2025, Rae Lemeshow-Barooshian of Loudwire included the album in her list of "the top 50 nu-metal albums of all time", ranking it thirteenth.

== Recording ==
"The first album was a lot of fun. The second album felt like we were saying, 'Fuck you, we're dying here.' And then the third record was the healing process." – Shawn Crahan

Slipknot recorded Vol. 3: The Subliminal Verses with producer Rick Rubin at The Mansion in Los Angeles in 2003. There had been speculation regarding the possibility of a third album and the band's future, owing to members working on other musical projects. After the album was completed, the band said these side projects "saved the band" and "helped [them] break out of the box [they] were in". Coming back together and working out their differences hindered the writing process initially. In 2008, drummer Joey Jordison said, "We didn't talk to each other for three months. We just sat there wasting money in the fucking Houdini mansion." Percussionist Shawn Crahan stated, "Eventually we got sick of waiting for shit to happen. We got together, had a few beers and wrote a really artsy, fucked up song called 'Happy Ending'."

In a 2003 interview, Jordison explained that despite the initial problems more than enough material was written for the album and added that "it's better to have stuff to pick from than to settle for shit", in contrast to how Slipknot settled too soon with fewer songs on previous albums. Lead vocalist Corey Taylor admitted in an interview that he drank heavily throughout their time in the mansion, saying "I would drink from the moment I got up until the moment I passed out." He explained that; "everything I did while I was drinking sounded like shit", while expressing how unhappy he was with the choice of vocal takes which ended up on the album. During this time, percussionist Crahan worked on Voliminal: Inside the Nine, a video documenting the creation process of the album and the touring which would follow.

In a Q&A for his book You're Making Me Hate You, Taylor stated that the first verse and chorus of the track "Circle" was written and recorded during the Iowa tour in 2001, and that it was the same take that ended up on the album.

Band members were divided over their experience of working with producer Rubin; some doubted his commitment to Slipknot as he split his time between many artists at once. In 2008, Taylor said he met Rubin only four times during the entire recording of Vol. 3… and that Rubin barely showed up to the studio: "We were being charged horrendous amounts of money. And for me, if you're going to produce something, you're fucking there. I don't care who you are." He added: "He is overrated, he is overpaid, and I will never work with him again." Conversely, guitarist Jim Root said in that same interview, "A lot of the guys in the band say Rick was unavailable. And yeah, he takes on a lot of projects at one time, but he also does things that are beneficial. He would listen to what we'd done, then have us retrack things that needed work. He's kind of like Big Brother up on the hill. Even though he wasn't there physically every day, he was. [Vol. 3 is] my favorite record we've done."

"Vol.3… was really hard for me. I was in such a dark and depressing place. But about halfway through I got my shit together. That's when I started the battle against my drinking and my crappy behaviour… ['Pulse of the Maggots'] was the anthem we'd been missing. It was originally called 'Triggers Yearn' and I was going in a whole different direction with it. Then Joey said he'd got a name for the song… but no lyrics. From then on, the song became more about the fans than it was about us. Without the fans, we'd be a bunch of jerks from Iowa, picking fights with each other in our basements." – Corey Taylor

== Music and lyrics ==
Before the release of Vol. 3, band members had promised a more experimental album; drummer Jordison said that "it's almost as if Slayer was tapping on Radiohead". For the first time in Slipknot's career, songs such as "Circle" and "Vermilion Pt. 2" were led by an acoustic rather than an electric guitar. According to Todd Burns of Stylus, songs such as "Pulse of the Maggots" and "Before I Forget" incorporate a "pounding metal" style. AllMusic wrote that tracks, such as "The Blister Exists", "Three Nil", and "Opium of the People", combine the two extremes of their recognizable metal edge with melody, and the most apparent shifts being in Taylor's vocal style, with relatively few songs relying solely on screamed vocals in comparison to their earlier work. Entertainment Weekly wrote that the album "[bounced] between over-powering speed-metal and haunting acoustic rock".

"Vermilion"
"Vermilion" makes use of guitar solos and melodic song structures which were absent from the band's previous albums.

Vol. 3: The Subliminal Verses is Slipknot's first album that does not warrant a Parental Advisory label, mainly because the lyrics of Vol. 3, compared to other Slipknot albums, are much less explicit in terms of profanity and obscure dark themes. While the standard edition does not feature the warning label, the special edition does due to the heavy profanity found in its bonus content. In a 2008 interview, guitarist Mick Thomson explained that vocalist Corey Taylor made a point of avoiding the use of profanity in response to claims that he relied on use of it. Only two instances of profanity occur on the album, which are the use of the word "bitched" in "Duality" and "bastards" which appears in the intro monologue for "Pulse of the Maggots".

According to AllMusic, the lyrics of Vol. 3: (The Subliminal Verses) include metaphors and touch on themes that include anger, disaffection, and psychosis. Taylor's diversity in his vocal delivery was praised; Burns considered tracks like "Vermilion Pt. 2" to have "stately vocal harmonies". Taylor's performance on the closing track "Danger – Keep Away" was specifically praised; Stylus called it the most "depressing and emotional" track on the album. Burns concluded that overall "the riffs have lost none of their impact, but it seems like finally the group also wants you to appreciate their vocal and lyrical impact."

== Artwork ==
The cover of the album features the "maggot mask" designed by Shawn Crahan. The name of the mask is a reference to the name given to fans by the band. The mask was made of stitched leather, with a zipper around the mouth area, and copies can be obtained as part of the band's merchandise. It is featured in the music video for the album's second single "Vermilion", in which the band appears whenever the protagonist wears the mask.

== Promotion ==
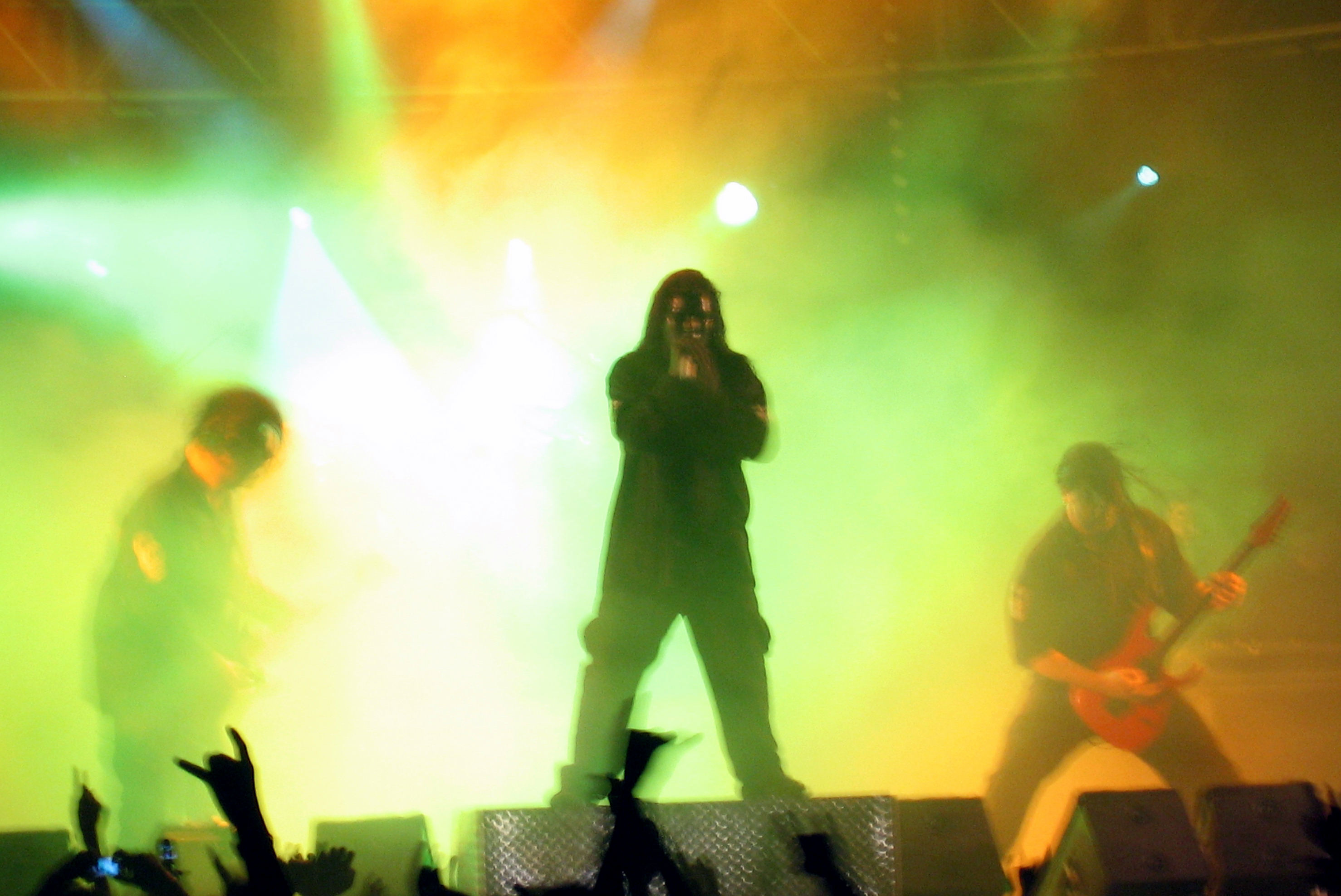
Slipknot performing in 2005 as part of The Subliminal Verses World Tour

Prior to the release of the album, the band released "Pulse of the Maggots" in its entirety as a free downloadable track on the now defunct SK Radio website, it was available for one day only on March 30, 2004. This also marked the beginning of Slipknot's touring cycle, The Subliminal Verses World Tour, starting with their appearance on the Jägermeister Music Tour. On May 4, 2004, "Duality" was released as their first official single. Vol. 3: (The Subliminal Verses) was finally released on May 25, 2004, to coincide with the release of the album "Duality" was released on a special edition 7-inch red vinyl. Alongside the normal edition of the album Roadrunner Records also released a limited edition CD that could connect to the Slipknot web site and obtain new songs and other promotional material, but as of 2009 the link on the CD has stopped working. Other singles from the album included "Vermilion", "Before I Forget" and "The Blister Exists". On April 12, 2005, a special edition version of the album, containing a bonus disc, was released.

== Critical reception ==
Professional ratings
Aggregate scores
Source	Rating
Metacritic	70/100
Review scores
Source	Rating
AllMusic	4/5 stars
Blender	3/5 stars
Entertainment Weekly	A−
NME	8/10
The Observer	4/5 stars
Playlouder	4/5 stars
Q	3.5/5 stars
Rolling Stone	3/5 stars
Spin	B
Sputnikmusic	4/5

According to the review aggregator Metacritic, Vol. 3: (The Subliminal Verses) received "generally favorable reviews" based on a weighted average score of 70 out of 100 from 12 critic scores. Johnny Loftus of AllMusic called the album "not just another flashy alt-metal billboard", praising the band's "dedication to making it a Slipknot album". Todd Burns of Stylus wrote that people who accuse the band of having "softened" are "mistaking softness for maturation". Burns went on to call the album "the best pop inflected metal album since System of a Down's Toxicity". Sean Richardson of Entertainment Weekly gave the album an A− and wrote that it is a "deranged hippie update" of Slayer's "masterpiece" Reign in Blood, which was also produced by Rubin. Q hailed Vol. 3: The Subliminal Verses as "a triumph". John Robb of PlayLouder complimented Slipknot's unexpected rise to become "one of the biggest groups in the world", dubbing "Before I Forget" a "classic [Slipknot] anthem". Robb added that the album is better than Iowa, citing its "differing textures". Rolling Stone gave the album a rating of 3 out of 5, stating the album presented "newer extremes" for the band, "which in Slipknot's case means tunefulness and traditional song structures".

A review from the BBC praised the album, declaring that there "is no finer metal band on the planet". It cited the group's integration of "hyperactive bass drums, complex, compelling riffs and ridiculously fast fretwork" with more melodic styles and described Vermilion as "the key track ... an emotional, melodramatic, utterly convincing rollercoaster ride".

Alternative Press criticized the album, writing that it "plays out like a tepid, second-rate version of Iowa, which pretty much makes it a third-rate anything else." Yahoo!'s Chris Heath also reviewed the album negatively, writing that "The Nameless" combines "the ludicrously vicious and ridiculously placid" and that by doing so makes the track feel "awkward". Heath added, "the themes are predictably absurd ... yet mildly comical given the inclusion of such disparate styles stationed side by side."

Vol. 3: The Subliminal Verses peaked at position number two on the US Billboard 200, following selling 242,683 copies in its first week. The album also charted and peaked at number two on the Australian Recording Industry Association, and Canadian sales charts. The album was certified Platinum in the United States on February 21, 2005. In 2006, the band won their first Grammy for Best Metal Performance with "Before I Forget". In 2009, Metal Hammer called it one of the "Albums of the Decade". It was also rated 31st in UK magazine Kerrang!'s "The 50 Best Albums of the 21st Century" reader poll. In 2005, the album was ranked number 396 in Rock Hard magazine's book The 500 Greatest Rock & Metal Albums of All Time.

== Track listing ==
All tracks written by Corey Taylor, Mick Thomson, Shawn Crahan, Craig Jones, Jim Root, Chris Fehn, Paul Gray, Joey Jordison and Sid Wilson.

No.	Title	Length
1.	"Prelude 3.0"	3:57
2.	"The Blister Exists"	5:19
3.	"Three Nil"	4:48
4.	"Duality"	4:12
5.	"Opium of the People"	3:12
6.	"Circle"	4:22
7.	"Welcome"	3:15
8.	"Vermilion"	5:16
9.	"Pulse of the Maggots"	4:19
10.	"Before I Forget"	4:38
11.	"Vermilion Pt. 2"	3:44
12.	"The Nameless"	4:28
13.	"The Virus of Life"	5:25
14.	"Danger – Keep Away"	3:13
Total length:		60:09

Japanese edition bonus track
No.	Title	Length
15.	"Scream"	4:31
Total length:		64:40

Japanese limited edition bonus DVD
No.	Title	Length
1.	"Duality" (music video)
2.	"Vermilion" (music video)

Australian tour edition bonus disc
No.	Title	Length
1.	"Don't Get Close"	3:47
2.	"Scream"	4:31
3.	"Vermilion" (single mix)	5:25
4.	"Danger – Keep Away" (full-length version)	7:55
5.	"Disasterpiece" (live)	5:25
6.	"New Abortion" (live)	4:01
7.	"People = Shit" (live)	3:54
Total length:		34:58

Special edition bonus disc
No.	Title	Length
1.	"Don't Get Close"	3:47
2.	"Scream"	4:31
3.	"Vermilion" (Terry Date mix)	5:25
4.	"Danger – Keep Away" (full-length version)	7:55
5.	"The Blister Exists" (live)	5:21
6.	"Three Nil" (live)	4:57
7.	"Disasterpiece" (live)	5:25
8.	"People = Shit" (live)	3:54
Total length:		41:15

Vinyl release - side one
No.	Title	Length
1.	"Prelude 3.0"	3:57
2.	"The Blister Exists"	5:19
3.	"Three Nil"	4:48
Total length:		15:04

Vinyl release - side two
No.	Title	Length
1.	"Duality"	4:12
2.	"Opium of the People"	3:12
3.	"Circle"	4:22
4.	"Welcome"	3:15
Total length:		15:01

Vinyl release - side three
No.	Title	Length
1.	"Vermilion"	5:16
2.	"Pulse of the Maggots"	4:19
3.	"Before I Forget"	4:38
Total length:		14:13

Vinyl release - side four
No.	Title	Length
1.	"Vermilion Pt. 2"	3:44
2.	"The Nameless"	4:28
3.	"The Virus of Life"	5:25
4.	"Danger - Keep Away"	3:13
Total length:		16:50

== Personnel ==
Aside from their real names, members of the band are referred to by numbers zero through eight.

=== Slipknot ===
- (#8) Corey Taylor – vocals
- (#7) Mick Thomson – guitars
- (#6) Shawn Crahan – percussion, backing vocals
- (#5) Craig Jones – samplers, keyboards
- (#4) Jim Root – guitars
- (#3) Chris Fehn – percussion, backing vocals
- (#2) Paul Gray – bass, backing vocals
- (#1) Joey Jordison – drums
- (#0) Sid Wilson – turntables

=== Design ===
- Shawn Crahan – art direction, photography
- Michael Boland – design for The Boland Design CO.
- Neil Zlozower – band photography

=== Production ===
- Rick Rubin – production
- Greg Fidelman – recording, mixing
- Phillip Broussard – assistant engineering
- Miles Wilson – assistant engineering
- Dan Monti – assistant engineering
- Joey Jordison – mixing
- Ted Jensen – mastering

== Charts ==
=== Weekly charts ===
Weekly chart performance for Vol. 3: (The Subliminal Verses)
Chart (2004)	Peak position
Australian Albums (ARIA)	2
Austrian Albums (Ö3 Austria)	5
Belgian Albums (Ultratop Flanders)	6
Belgian Albums (Ultratop Wallonia)	12
Canadian Albums (Billboard)	2
Danish Albums (Hitlisten)	7
Dutch Albums (Album Top 100)	14
Finnish Albums (Suomen virallinen lista)	2
French Albums (SNEP)	6
German Albums (Offizielle Top 100)	2
Hungarian Albums (MAHASZ)	29
Irish Albums (IRMA)	5
Italian Albums (FIMI)	14
Japanese Albums (Oricon)	2
New Zealand Albums (RMNZ)	3
Norwegian Albums (VG-lista)	15
Polish Albums (ZPAV)	24
Portuguese Albums (AFP)	13
Scottish Albums (Official Charts)	3
Spanish Albums (Promusicae)	4
Swedish Albums (Sverigetopplistan)	2
Swiss Albums (Schweizer Hitparade)	8
UK Albums (Official Charts)	5
UK Rock & Metal Albums (Official Charts)	1
US Billboard 200	2

=== Year-end charts ===
2004 year-end chart performance for Vol. 3: (The Subliminal Verses)
Chart (2004)	Position
Belgian Albums (Ultratop Flanders)	82
German Albums (Offizielle Top 100)	50
Swedish Albums (Sverigetopplistan)	100
UK Albums (OCC)	150
US Billboard 200	77

2005 year-end chart performance for Vol. 3: (The Subliminal Verses)
Chart (2005)	Position
US Billboard 200	191

== Certifications ==
Certifications for Vol. 3: (The Subliminal Verses)
Region	Certification	Certified units/sales
Australia (ARIA)	Platinum	70,000^{^}
Canada (Music Canada)	2× Platinum	200,000^{‡}
Denmark (IFPI Danmark)	Platinum	20,000^{‡}
Germany (BVMI)	Gold	100,000^{^}
Japan (RIAJ)	Gold	100,000^{^}
New Zealand (RMNZ)	Platinum	15,000^{‡}
Norway (IFPI Norway)	Gold	10,000^{‡}
Poland (ZPAV)	Gold	10,000^{‡}
United Kingdom (BPI)	Platinum	300,000^{‡}
United States (RIAA)	Platinum	1,000,000^{^}
^{^} Shipments figures based on certification alone.^{‡} Sales+streaming figures based on certification alone.
