= Ibanez MTM =

Guitar model created by Mick Thomson and distributed by Ibanez

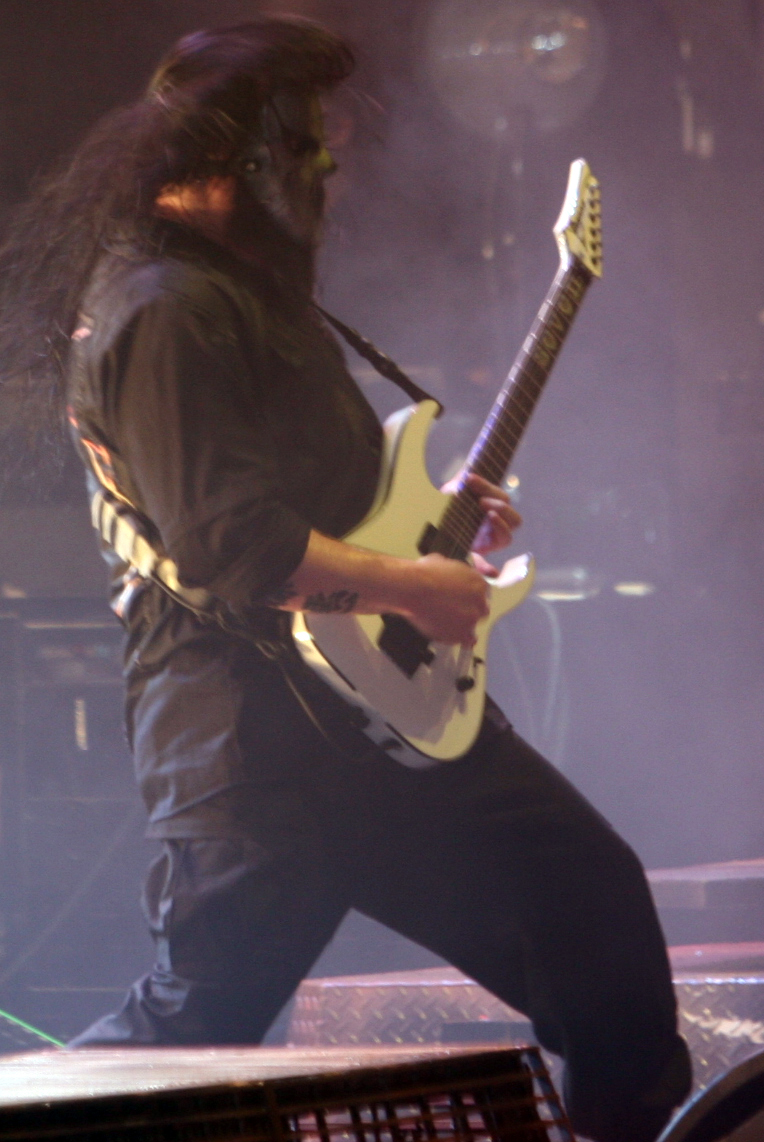
- Mick Thomson playing a RG shaped MTM guitar, in 2008
- Manufacturer: Ibanez
- Period: 2006 — 2016

Construction
- Body type: Solid
- Neck joint: Neck-thru, Bolt-on
- Scale: 25.5

Woods
- Body: Mahogany
- Neck: Maple and Walnut
- Fretboard: Ebony, Rosewood

Hardware
- Bridge: Fixed
- Pickup(s): H-H

Colors available
- White, Black, Red

The Ibanez MTM series was a series of signature guitars created by Slipknot's Mick Thomson, and produced by Ibanez. Some of the MTMs had the Ibanez RG shape and some had the Ibanez Glaive shape. They have two humbucking pickups (H-H configuration), and the fixed Edge FX bridge, which is based on Ibanez Edge tremolo but fixed, providing more tuning stability than a standard hard-tail. Contrary to popular belief, the MTM series guitars do not have a tremolo bar or system. They came factory tuned to Drop B (B, F#, B, E, G#, C# [low to high]), a very low tuning that Slipknot used frequently. The MTM series was discontinued in 2016, when Mick Thomson switched to Jackson Guitars.

== Models ==
=== RG shape (2006–2011) (2014–2016) ===
MTM1
The MTM1 is constructed with the neck-through method, has a mahogany body, and a five-piece maple/walnut neck. The neck is the wizard II neck and the newer generations of the MTM1 do not have the thumbstop behind the headstock. When the MTM1 was first released, it came out of the factory with active EMG pickups: the 81 and 60. The second generation MTM1s came with Seymour Duncan AHB-1 Blackouts and came in two colors: black with white binding, or the traditional blood red with black binding. The third generation MTM1s were released with a few modifications from their predecessors. They featured a volute behind the headstock, the AHB-1 Blackouts were changed to Thomson's signature EMTY Blackouts, and the output jack was mounted on the side of the guitar, like that of an Ibanez JEM. The MTM1 is the more expensive model. The MTM1 also featured the "seven" inlay across the first five frets.

MTM2
The Ibanez MTM2 is the more affordable sister guitar of the MTM1; it has a mahogany body, bolt-on five-piece maple and walnut neck, locking nut, EDGE III Fixed bridge, and Duncan designed active pickups (earlier models shipped with Ibanez V7 and V8 pickups). The MTM2 was offered in black with white binding, and later white with black binding. The "seven" inlays were removed, and it is now written on the truss rod cover.

MTM20
Similar to the MTM2, the MTM20 has a mahogany body, five-piece maple and walnut bolt-on neck, locking nut, FX Edge III bridge, and the Duncan Designed active pickups. However the 'seven' inlays normally featured on higher-end models was present. The MTM20 comes only in white with black binding. The MTM20 also featured a volute on the headstock.

=== Glaive shape (2012–2014) ===
For 2012, Ibanez released new MTM models based on tests Mick had been using for the various tours since All Hope Is Gone. Based on Ibanez' Glaive shape, there are again two models, a high-grade expensive model, and a medium-grade model.

MTM100
The higher grade MTM100 comes only in black finish. It features the new Seymour Duncan EMTY active pickups. The five-piece Wizard III maple/walnut neck-through is squeezed between mahogany wings. The FX Edge III fixed bridge returns from the previous MTMs. This top-of-the-line version returns the "seven" inlay at the first five frets.

MTM10
The MTM10, the lower grade of the new two, comes only in blood red finish. It also drops the "seven" inlay. Like the MTM2, it features a bolt-on three-piece maple/mahogany Wizard III neck. As for the pickups, the EMTYs are dropped in favor of a less expensive model, the Duncan HB-105MT active humbuckers in neck, and bridge positions.
