= Vermilion (song) =

2004 single by Slipknot

Single by Slipknot

from the album Vol. 3: (The Subliminal Verses)
- A-side: "Vermilion"
- B-side: "Vermilion Pt. 2"; "Scream"
- Released: October 5, 2004
- Genre: Alternative metal
- Length: 5:16 (album version); 4:17 (single mix)
- Label: Roadrunner
- Songwriters: Shawn Crahan; Chris Fehn; Paul Gray; Craig Jones; Joey Jordison; Jim Root; Corey Taylor; Mick Thomson; Sid Wilson
- Producer: Rick Rubin

Slipknot singles chronology
"Duality" (2004)	"Vermilion" (2004)	"Before I Forget" (2005)

Music video
- "Vermillion" on YouTube

"Vermilion" is a song by American heavy metal band Slipknot. It was released as the second single from their third album, Vol. 3: (The Subliminal Verses). When the band plays the song live, they switch from their ordinary masks to "death masks"; each an actual cast of each member's face. However, during the All Hope Is Gone tour, only Craig Jones and Paul Gray wore their death masks for the song.

== Background ==
"That song was on a demo that Paul [Gray, bassist] and Joey [Jordison, drummer] put together. For some reason, as soon as I heard it, all I could see was the colour red. I love the idea of creating a world from the standpoint of a stalker. I was trying to recreate that dark urgency and desperate need. Anyone who's ever had that jealous rage knows what that feeling is." – Corey Taylor

"I wrote most of this, then Paul put the middle section together. When I write, I'm always thinking of [singer] Corey's place in the song. That chemistry between me, Paul and Corey has always been interesting." – Joey Jordison

== "Vermilion Pt. 2" ==
"Vermilion Pt. 2"

Promotional single by Slipknot

from the album Vol. 3: (The Subliminal Verses)
- Released: October 5, 2004
- Length: 3:44
- Label: Roadrunner
- Songwriters: Shawn Crahan; Chris Fehn; Paul Gray; Craig Jones; Joey Jordison; Jim Root; Corey Taylor; Mick Thomson; Sid Wilson
- Producer: Rick Rubin

Slipknot singles chronology
"Vermilion" (2004)	"Vermilion Pt. 2" (2004)	"Before I Forget" (2005)

Music video
- "Vermillion Pt. 2" on YouTube

"Vermilion Pt. 2" is the continuation of the story in Part 1. It features two acoustic guitars, a cello, a piano and Corey Taylor's baritone-styled vocals. The melody and the overriding theme run through both versions, making them integral to each other. It features on the Slipknot DVD, Voliminal: Inside the Nine and was performed by Taylor and Jim Root on radio station KISS-FM. The cover for "Pt. 2" consists of the "Vermilion" single cover, with a red and yellow tint, as opposed to the pink and gray tint of Pt. 1. A remix – "Vermilion Pt. 2 (Bloodstone mix)" – appears on the Underworld: Evolution soundtrack and the special edition of All Hope Is Gone.

"The differences (between the two tracks) are subtle — 'Vermilion Pt. 1' is about the enrapturing, the buildup, the anticipation and the neurosis," says Taylor. "'Part 2' is the aftermath, the pieces that have to be picked up later, and maybe the guilt of having lived through it".

== Music videos ==
Both songs have music videos. "Pt. 1" was directed by Tony Petrossian and percussionist Shawn Crahan and "Pt. 2" was directed by Marc Klasfeld. Both videos were shot in Los Angeles in late August 2004.

"Pt. 1" shows a girl living a tortured life in a crowded city. She walks in contortions and twists as people walk by in a blur, not noticing her pain. The only time she gets noticed is when she wears a Maggot Mask (specially designed for fans of the band) that makes the members of the band appear and dance with the girl. The first time she puts on the mask, the members appear in front of her and put on a white mask that enables their true faces to be seen for a couple of seconds. Then the band dance with her. A caterpillar is seen growing in the video; at the end scene it turns into a butterfly. The video ends with the girl screaming and tearing her hair out in misery.

"Pt. 2" shows the same girl; this time in a field peacefully sleeping. The wind begins to lift her and sway her back and forth. Eventually, the viewer realizes the girl is dead; however, she appears more peaceful than in the first video.

The music video is available on the CD single, and the DVD Voliminal: Inside the Nine, released in 2006.

== Track listing ==
EU/JP CD single

No.	Title	Length
1.	"Vermilion" (Single Mix)	4:16
2.	"Scream"	4:32
3.	"Danger – Keep Away" (Full-Length version)	7:53

- includes music video "Vermilion"

EU cardboard sleeve CD single / 7" vinyl

No.	Title	Length
1.	"Vermilion" (Single Mix)	4:14
2.	"Scream"	4:30

EU 2nd CD single

No.	Title	Length
1.	"Vermilion" (Single Mix)	3:59
2.	"Scream"	4:30
3.	"Vermilion" (Full-Length Single Mix)	5:17

US Euro Radio Edit Promo CD

No.	Title	Length
1.	"Vermilion" (Euro Radio Edit)	3:59

NE Promo CD

No.	Title	Length
1.	"Vermilion" (Single Mix)	3:59
2.	"Vermilion" (Full-Length Single Mix)	5:17

US Full-Length Single Mix Promo CD

No.	Title	Length
1.	"Vermilion" (Full-Length Single Mix)	5:17

US Promo CD

No.	Title	Length
1.	"Vermilion" (Edit)
2.	"Vermilion" (Album Version)
3.	"Vermilion pt.2"

Vermilion Pt. 2 Promo CD

No.	Title	Length
1.	"Vermilion Pt. 2"	3:44

== Charts ==
Chart performance for "Vermilion"
Chart (2004)	Peak position
Germany (GfK)	74
Scottish Singles Sales (Official Charts)	33
Spain (Promusicae)	16
UK Singles (Official Charts)	31
UK Rock & Metal (Official Charts)	2
US Alternative Airplay (Billboard)	17
US Mainstream Rock (Billboard)	14

== Certifications ==
Certifications for "Vermilion"
Region	Certification	Certified units/sales
New Zealand (RMNZ)	Gold	15,000^{‡}
^{‡} Sales+streaming figures based on certification alone.

== Release history ==
Release dates and formats for "Vermilion"
Region	Date	Label	Format	Catalog
Worldwide release	October 5, 2004	Roadrunner	CD single	RR 2907-3
Worldwide release	October 5, 2004	Roadrunner	CD single	RR 3977-0
