= Voliminal: Inside the Nine =

Video by Slipknot
- Released: December 5, 2006
- Recorded: 2003–2005
- Genres: Heavy metal; nu metal; alternative metal
- Length: 84:44 (movie only)
- Label: Roadrunner
- Director: Shawn Crahan
- Producer: Neil Zaugg

Slipknot chronology
Disasterpieces (2002)	Voliminal: Inside the Nine (2006)	(sic)nesses (2010)

Voliminal: Inside the Nine is the third video album by American heavy metal band Slipknot. Released December 5, 2006 by Roadrunner Records, the 2-disc DVD set features an 84-minute movie created by band member Shawn "Clown" Crahan. The set also includes live performances, music videos from songs on the band's third studio album, Vol. 3: (The Subliminal Verses), and the first unmasked interviews with all of the band members. The movie featured footage recorded from the recording of Vol. 3: (The Subliminal Verses) through the end of the tour in support of the album spanning a total of 28 months. The DVD was promoted on various websites for the weeks leading up to its limited theatrical release. Critical reception of the album was mixed. Dawn wrote that the album has "a raw sound," calling it "an audible treat for thrash and speed metal fans". Billboard wrote to "save your cash for the band's next tour." Voliminal was certified gold, platinum, and double platinum in Australia, the United States, and Canada respectively.

== Conception and recording ==
The initial idea for the DVD came to percussionist Shawn Crahan three weeks before the band entered The Mansion in 2003, where they would work on their third studio album, Vol. 3: (The Subliminal Verses). Crahan received help from the band's record label, Roadrunner, which supplied them with tapes, camera cleaning equipment and funds to hire people to operate the cameras when Crahan himself could not. Recording began when Slipknot entered The Mansion and continued until they had finished touring in 2005, reportedly covering 28 months of the band's time together. Crahan's intentions were to capture as many different Slipknot situations as he could, so when the opportunity to produce a DVD came, he would be in a position to begin work immediately. When the footage was being shot, Crahan began making little tests of the footage and revealed them to his fellow bandmates, judging their reactions to help him establish areas of interest from them. The whole recording process produced over 300 60-minute tapes of footage.

== Production and promotion ==
Similarly to the editing process of their previous DVD Disasterpieces, Crahan watched and analysed all the footage recorded for the DVD; however, in contrast to Disasterpieces, this DVD intended to show a previously unseen side to the band. During an interview in 2006, guitarist Mick Thomson explained that, with the DVD, the band intended to "bring something new". He went on to add "[there's] more backstage stuff, getting to see more inside stuff as opposed to just a concert performance." Crahan explained how he wanted to allow the viewer in on more of their time instead of just their performance, recalling a moment when the band were in Australia. He included the footage in the film, explaining, "So I go down to Australia and I go ‘Jesus, there’s bats in the air.’ I’m going to film it and share it with you because it’s part of our lives together. But most bands and people don’t want to share that side of it and I think that’s wrong." Throughout the movie, whenever the band members appear unmasked, their faces are blurred, whereas on the second disc, during the interviews, they are completely revealed. When questioned on the subject during an interview on The Sauce in 2007, Crahan explained that when the band perform, the masks are always a part of their show and footage of them unmasked is blurred to represent this, further adding: "We chose to blur it because, it's really an intrusion. [...] That's our safe place and I kind of broke the veil a little bit by grabbing a camera and trying to show everybody those kinds of things that go on."

Prior to the release of the DVD, a promotional website was launched which featured two short teaser videos. Also, for the five weeks prior to its release, five short teaser videos were released through the Roadrunner Records website respectively. The DVD was released on December 5, 2006, and was premiered in 22 separate theatres across the United States. Following the release of the DVD, a music video for the song "The Blister Exists" was released, the video featured footage from Voliminal: Inside the Nine and was of the same style as the movie.

The DVD is rated R16 in New Zealand for graphic violence, sexual references and offensive language.

== Reception ==
Professional ratings
Review scores
Source	Rating
Allmovie	(favorable) link
Billboard	(unfavorable) link
Blogcritics	(mixed) link
Dawn	(favorable) link
Film School Rejects	(mixed) link
Kerrang!	3/5 stars
TuneLab Music	link

Critical reception for Voliminal was mixed. The newspaper Dawn called the DVD "an audible treat for thrash and speed metal fans", he went on to compliment drummer Joey Jordison, stating that he "structures his beats and percussions in a very traditional thrash set-up, almost as well as (dare I say it) the great Dave Lombardo of Slayer fame". Ultimate Guitar called the DVD "behind-the-scene action in an unorthodox format, complete with choppy editing and absolutely no specific chronology". They would go on to state though the DVD "only gives partial attention to the music", "The best moment in the 2-disc collection comes during a chat with Corey Taylor, who shares his feelings about everything from his less-than-perfect relationship with his father to the obstacles that the band faced in its early days". TuneLab wrote "Slipknot takes a unique approach to their latest film, as they turn what could have been a mundane video of live footage and band antics into a rather peculiar and extremely interesting movie". The "scatterbrained and choppy" style of Voliminal "[will cause] the viewer to feel like he or she is "outside looking in", rather than being truly involved with the band's happenings". Reviewing for Blogcritics, Chris Beaumont wrote "[he] was enthralled and bored by the documentary". He went on to state, "the best part is watching them perform", despite the audio being "near unlistenable", "these guys know their way around the stage...this shows the whole package". Reviewing for Billboard, Christa Titus criticized the DVD, writing that it "randomly [strings] footage from concerts and the usual backstage antics with images of pigeons and overflowing toilets, then tossing in whatever visual effects struck M. Shawn Crahan's fancy while he edited it." She concluded "Save your cash for the band's next tour...that's where you'll get your money's worth". Film School Rejects's Cole Abaius wrote of the DVD, "[Except fans], probably no one else will purchase or enjoy this DVD". He added that with no narration, "the images are left to speak for themselves", only "some just don’t speak loudly enough". Despite the mixed reviews, Voliminal was certified gold in Australia, platinum in the United States, and double platinum in Canada. The album peaked at the fifth spot on Billboard's Music Video charts, and remained on the chart for 10 weeks.

== Contents ==
The first disc of Voliminal: Inside The Nine is an 84-minute movie constructed of a mixture of live performance, backstage and studio footage. The film was shot on handheld digital cameras and features rapid edits between footage which follows no chronological order. The film contains ten "rabbit holes", nine of which feature additional footage for each member of the band.

Interviews

The second disc includes interviews with all nine members of the band, which are the first formal interviews of Slipknot to be released without their masks, excluding members' appearances outside of Slipknot.

The Concert

- "(sic)" (The Eurockeenes Festival 2004)
- "The Blister Exists" (WFF 2004)
- "Eyeless" (WFF 2004)
- "Vermilion" (TMF Awards 2004)
- "Duality" (Summer Sonic 2005)
- "The Heretic Anthem" (Summer Sonic 2005)
- "Pulse of the Maggots" (Summer Sonic 2005)
- "Before I Forget" (Summer Sonic 2005)
- "People = Shit" (Summer Sonic 2005)

Music videos

- "Duality"
- "Vermilion"
- "Vermilion Pt. 2"
- "Before I Forget"
- "The Nameless"

== Personnel ==
Aside from their real names, members of the band are referred to by numbers zero through eight.

Slipknot

- (#0) Sid Wilson – turntables
- (#1) Joey Jordison – drums, mixing
- (#2) Paul Gray – bass, backing vocals
- (#3) Chris Fehn – percussion, backing vocals
- (#4) Jim Root – guitars
- (#5) Craig Jones – samples, media
- (#6) Shawn Crahan – percussion, backing vocals, editing
- (#7) Mick Thomson – guitars
- (#8) Corey Taylor – vocals

Production team

- Neil Zaugg – producer, editor
- Corey Brennan – management
- Scott Kaven – visual effects, fly on the wall
- Michael Boland – package design
- Monte Conner – A&R
- David Rath – project coordinator
- Ben Kim – menu design
- Chuck Close – authoring
- Tommy Dalton – foley, damage control audio
- Jean-Luc Cohen – sound design
- Tom Hutten – audio mastering
- Paul Hickey – director of photography
- Bobby Tongs – videography
- George Christ – videography
- Jon Van Allen – videography
- Michael Ericson – videography
- Steve Faust – gaffer
- Cory Doss – grip
- Dale Cowdin – audio
- Jennifer Chiodo – makeup

== Certifications ==
Region	Certification	Certified units/sales
Australia (ARIA)	Platinum	15,000^{^}
Canada (Music Canada)	2× Platinum	20,000^{^}
United States (RIAA)	Platinum	100,000^{^}
^{^} Shipments figures based on certification alone.
