= Duality (song) =

Single by Slipknot

from the album Vol. 3: (The Subliminal Verses)
- B-side: "Don't Get Close"
- Released: May 4, 2004
- Genre: Nu metal; alternative metal
- Length: 4:12 (album version); 3:33 (radio edit)
- Label: Roadrunner
- Songwriters: Shawn Crahan; Chris Fehn; Paul Gray; Craig Jones; Joey Jordison; Jim Root; Corey Taylor; Mick Thomson; Sid Wilson
- Producer: Rick Rubin

Slipknot singles chronology
"My Plague" (2002)	"Duality" (2004)	"Vermilion" (2004)

Music video
- "Duality" on YouTube

"Duality" is a song by American heavy metal band Slipknot. It was released on May 4, 2004, as the first single from the band's third album, Vol. 3: (The Subliminal Verses). A music video was made for the song, which was listed as Roadrunner's greatest video of all time.

== Musical structure ==
The album version of "Duality" is four minutes and twelve seconds long, and the radio edited version is three minutes and thirty-three seconds long. The song opens with lead vocalist Corey Taylor softly saying "I push my fingers into my...", leading up to guitarist Mick Thomson playing a riff accompanied by Craig Jones' keyboards while Taylor finishes the sentence with "...eyes", in a much more intense voice. The song is played in drop B tuning (to which most of Slipknot's songs are tuned) and features a nu metal style.

Unlike many previous Slipknot singles, "Duality", like most of the songs on Vol. 3, does not have strong profanity. Thomson explained in a 2008 interview that vocalist Taylor was relying on explicit content in the lyrics, and wanted to try something "different". This was echoed by Jim Root in a 2011 interview. AllMusic said that "Duality"'s lyrics "aren't unique" to Slipknot but described it as "otherwise strong". Stylus Magazine said "Duality" had a "grindcore riff". Q wrote that the song "blow[s] the competition away".

== Release and reception ==
"Duality" was originally released as a CD single on May 4, 2004. On May 25, 2004, the single was released on 7-inch red vinyl to coincide with the release of the album. There is also a 7-inch picture disc release which includes the same track listing.

"Duality" reached band records of number five and six in the Hot Mainstream Rock Tracks and Hot Modern Rock Tracks charts (although on the former chart, the record has since been broken by "Dead Memories" and eventually "Snuff"). In the UK Singles Chart, the song reached number 15. The song also charted on the Bubbling Under Hot 100 chart at number six (their second highest-charting song on the chart, behind "Psychosocial"). To promote the single, the band also made an appearance on The Tonight Show with Jay Leno on May 17, 2004.

In the 2004 Metal Edge Readers' Choice Awards, the song was voted "Song of the Year" and "Music Video of the Year". In 2020, Kerrang and Louder Sound ranked the song number five and number three, respectively, on their lists of the greatest Slipknot songs. Jack Osbourne ranked the song number two on his list of "101 Adrenaline Rock Songs", with "Smells Like Teen Spirit" by Nirvana beating it to the number one spot.

== Music video ==
The music video, directed by Mark Klasfeld and Tony Petrossian, cost between $300,000 and $500,000 and was recorded on March 27, 2004. It was shot in West Des Moines, Iowa, at a fan's house that was due for renovation, and features the band performing inside the house surrounded by dozens of fans both inside and outside the house, which gets destroyed in the process as the fans crash through the windows and walls.

The video starts with a large crowd of fans running towards the camera which is clearly behind a window. As the song switches in intensity the video cuts to shots inside the house of the band performing in very close quarters with the fans. The video constantly switches between clips of the band performing and fans destroying the house and the surrounding environment. At one point in the video, when lead singer Corey Taylor sings the lyrics, "You cannot kill what you did not create", the words are seen painted on the garage door behind the crowd of fans. Prior to a coda section, Corey seemingly calms the crowd with an outstretched arm, which is followed with him pacing through the crowd repeating the lyrics "All I've got, all I've got is insane". An even larger crowd standing outdoors observes the performance. Once the chorus begins again the crowd immediately continues to destroy their surroundings.

Shawn Crahan recalls that the band "asked our real fans to be in the video and people came from all over", adding that "it meant so much to us. We weren't really supposed to destroy that house – but we did it anyway. Another plus for that song is that I get to beat the fuck out of my keg. What else could you want?"

In the aftermath, the family asked the band to replace an extensive list of objects and fittings that were damaged or destroyed during the shoot.

The music video is also available on the CD single and the DVD Voliminal: Inside the Nine, released in 2006.

== Track listing ==
All songs written by Slipknot.

CD single

No.	Title	Length
1.	"Duality" (Single version)	3:33
2.	"Don't Get Close"	3:45
3.	"Disasterpiece" (Live)	5:23

- include music video "Duality" on some versions

7" vinyl / EU cardboard sleeve CD single

No.	Title	Length
1.	"Duality" (Single version)	3:33
2.	"Don't Get Close"	3:45

US promo CD

No.	Title	Length
1.	"Duality" (Edit)	3:33
2.	"Duality" (Album version)	4:12

EU promo CD

No.	Title	Length
1.	"Duality" (Edit)	3:33

== Charts ==
=== Weekly charts ===
Weekly chart performance for "Duality"
Chart (2004)	Peak position
Belgium (Ultratop 50 Flanders)	7
Belgium (Ultratop 50 Wallonia)	37
France (SNEP)	74
Germany (GfK)	38
Hungary (Single Top 40)	6
Ireland (IRMA)	43
Italy (FIMI)	27
Netherlands (Single Top 100)	63
Scottish Singles Sales (Official Charts)	16
Sweden (Sverigetopplistan)	35
Switzerland (Schweizer Hitparade)	87
UK Singles (Official Charts)	15
UK Rock & Metal (Official Charts)	1
US Bubbling Under Hot 100 (Billboard)	6
US Alternative Airplay (Billboard)	6
US Mainstream Rock (Billboard)	5

=== Year-end charts ===
Year-end chart performance for "Duality"
Chart (2004)	Position
US Mainstream Rock Tracks (Billboard)	11

== Certifications ==
Certifications for "Duality"
Region	Certification	Certified units/sales
Austria (IFPI Austria)	Platinum	30,000^{*}
Canada (Music Canada)	3× Platinum	240,000^{‡}
Denmark (IFPI Danmark)	Gold	45,000^{‡}
Germany (BVMI)	Gold	300,000^{‡}
Italy (FIMI)	Gold	50,000^{‡}
New Zealand (RMNZ)	3× Platinum	90,000^{‡}
Portugal (AFP)	Platinum	40,000^{‡}
Spain (Promusicae)	Gold	30,000^{‡}
United Kingdom (BPI)	2× Platinum	1,200,000^{‡}
^{*} Sales figures based on certification alone.^{‡} Sales+streaming figures based on certification alone.

== Release history ==
Release dates and formats for "Duality"
Year	Type	Label	Catalog	Ref
2004	12-inch	Roadrunner	3988-7	
2004	7-inch	Roadrunner	13984-7	
2004	LP	Roadrunner	RR 3988	
2004	CD	Roadrunner	3988-0	
2004	CD	Universal	6139883	
