= Before I Forget (song) =

Single by Slipknot

from the album Vol. 3: (The Subliminal Verses)
- Released: 2005
- Genre: Nu metal
- Length: 4:38 (album version); 4:20 (radio edit); 3:37 (single mix)
- Label: Roadrunner
- Songwriters: Shawn Crahan; Chris Fehn; Paul Gray; Craig Jones; Joey Jordison; Jim Root; Corey Taylor; Mick Thomson; Sid Wilson
- Producer: Rick Rubin

Slipknot singles chronology
"Vermilion" (2004)	"Before I Forget" (2005)	"The Nameless" (2005)

Alternative cover

Music video
- "Before I Forget" on YouTube

"Before I Forget" is a song by American heavy metal band Slipknot. It was released as the third single from the band's third studio album, Vol. 3: (The Subliminal Verses) (2004). The song won a Grammy Award for Best Metal Performance in 2006.

"Before I Forget" borrows elements from a much older Slipknot song "Carve", recorded before their self-titled album. The earliest version was in 1996 with Anders Colsefni on vocals. "Carve" was for the SR Demo 1997, referred to by fans as Crowz.

"It's about standing your ground and deciding to be a good person, no matter what people say," recalled singer Corey Taylor. "[Producer] Rick Rubin was convinced the chorus wouldn't work. I told him he was crazy. Lo and behold, it's one of our biggest songs and we won a Grammy for it."

== Reception and awards ==
"Before I Forget" is widely regarded as one of the band's best songs. In 2020, Kerrang and Louder Sound ranked the song number seven and number six, respectively, on their lists of the greatest Slipknot songs.

After being nominated six times, the band won the 2006 Grammy Award for Best Metal Performance. It was the second track from the album to be nominated: "Vermilion" was nominated in 2005 for the same award.

== Music video ==
The video for "Before I Forget" shows Slipknot performing the song unmasked and in casual clothes (all with black shirts), as opposed to their usual coveralls. The video makes use of strategic camera techniques in which the members' faces are never totally shown (in some instances, however, some of the band members' eyes are shown up close), thus keeping with the band's running theme of anonymity at the time. Their masks are shown next to them as they perform. At the end of the music video, the band immediately stops playing the song as it ends and they all walk away.

The music video for "Before I Forget" was directed by Tony Petrossian and was voted as the "Most Rocking Video" by the Scuzz audience in the Top 100 Most Rocking Videos 2007.

This music video also helped to garner the band its first and only Grammy Award win for "Best Metal Performance" in 2006.

=== Equipment ===
- Jim Root's Black Charvel Custom San Dimas
- Mick Thomson's Blood Red Ibanez MTM1
- Paul Gray's Warwick Streamer Stage 1 LH
- Joey Jordison's custom Pearl drum kit

== Track listing ==
7" vinyl part one

No.	Title	Length
1.	"Before I Forget" (Single Mix)	3:37
2.	"The Blister Exists" (Live)	5:19

7" vinyl part two

No.	Title	Length
1.	"Before I Forget" (Full-Length Single Mix)	4:23
2.	"Three Nil" (Live)	4:55

US promo CD

No.	Title	Length
1.	"Before I Forget" (Single Mix)	3:37
2.	"Before I Forget" (Full-Length Single Mix)	4:23

EU promo CD

No.	Title	Length
1.	"Before I Forget" (Single Mix)	3:37

Digital download

No.	Title	Length
1.	"Before I Forget" (Live)	4:26

== Charts ==
=== Weekly charts ===
Weekly chart performance for "Before I Forget"
Chart (2005–2007)	Peak position
Scottish Singles Sales (Official Charts)	31
UK Singles (Official Charts)	35
UK Rock & Metal (Official Charts)	3
US Alternative Airplay (Billboard)	32
US Mainstream Rock (Billboard)	11

=== Year-end charts ===
Year-end chart performance for "Before I Forget"
Chart (2005)	Position
US Mainstream Rock Tracks (Billboard)	26

== Certifications ==
Certifications for "Before I Forget"
Region	Certification	Certified units/sales
Canada (Music Canada)	3× Platinum	240,000^{‡}
New Zealand (RMNZ)	Platinum	30,000^{‡}
Portugal (AFP)	Gold	20,000^{‡}
United Kingdom (BPI)	Platinum	600,000^{‡}
United States (RIAA)	Platinum	1,000,000^{‡}
^{‡} Sales+streaming figures based on certification alone.
