= Mick Thomson =

American musician (born 1973)

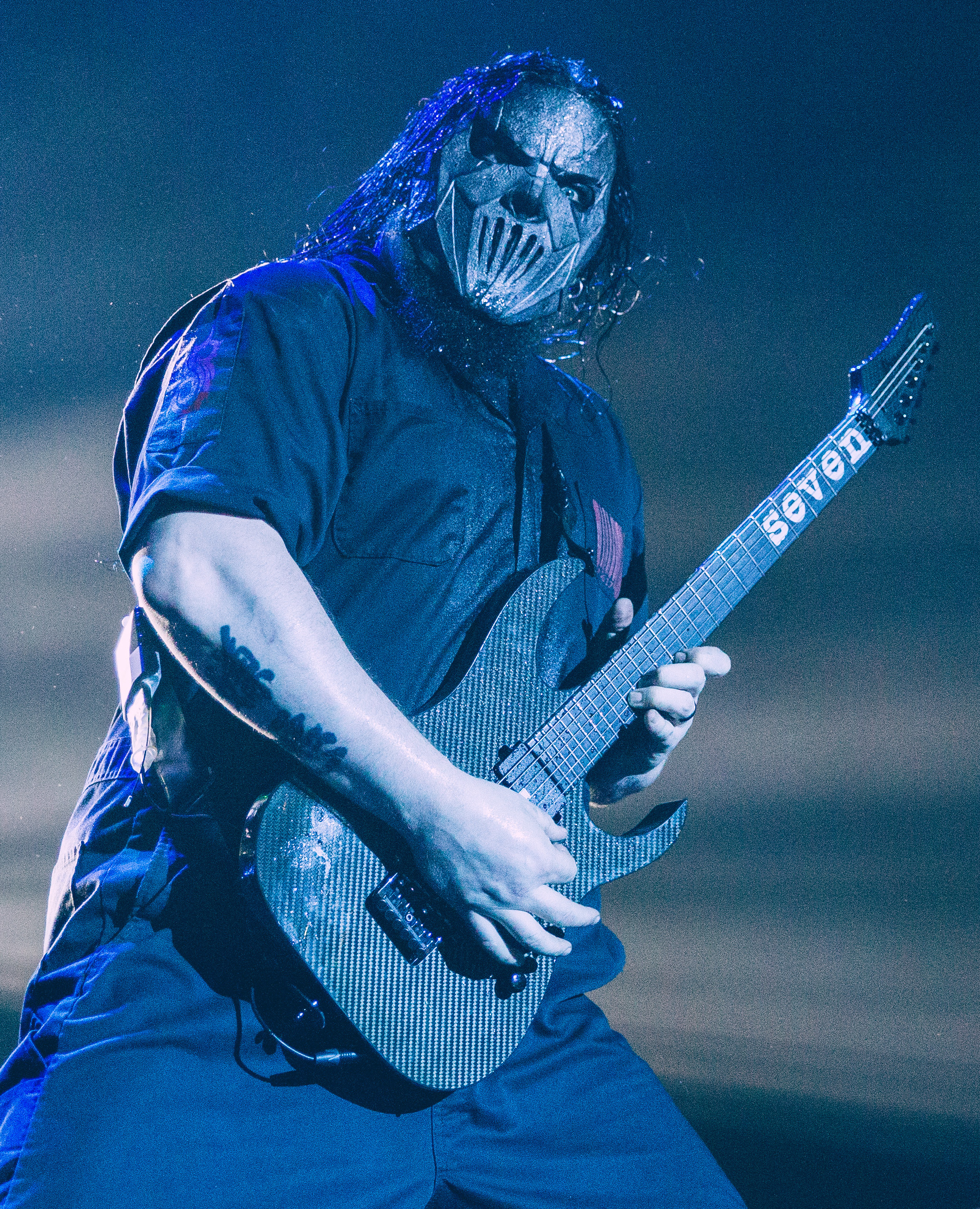
- Thomson performing with Slipknot in 2016

Background information
- Also known as: #7
- Born: Mickael Gordon Thomson; November 3, 1973 (age 52)
- Origin: Des Moines, Iowa, U.S.
- Genres: Heavy metal; nu metal; death metal; groove metal; alternative metal; hard rock
- Occupation: Musician
- Instrument: Guitar
- Years active: 1993–present
- Member of: Slipknot
- Formerly of: Body Pit

Mickael Gordon "Mick" Thomson (born November 3, 1973) is an American musician. He is one of two guitarists for the heavy metal band Slipknot, in which he is designated #7. Thomson, who originally met founding Slipknot members Anders Colsefni, Donnie Steele and Paul Gray through their mutual involvement in death metal band Body Pit, joined Slipknot in early 1996. Following the departure of bandmates drummer Joey Jordison in 2013 and sampler Craig Jones in 2023, Thomson is now the second longest-serving member of Slipknot.

== Early life ==
Thomson grew up having a "fascination with death metal bands", including Internal Bleeding and Morbid Angel, although he has also named the Beatles as one of his major musical influences. He began his career playing lead guitar in a number of local bands in his hometown of Des Moines, Iowa, most notably death metal outfit Body Pit, formed in 1993. Original Slipknot members Anders Colsefni (lead vocals), Donnie Steele (rhythm guitar) and Paul Gray (bass) were all fellow members of Body Pit during this period. In addition to performing in the band, Thomson gave guitar lessons to local students at Ye Olde Guitar Shop on 70th Street in Des Moines.

== Career ==
Thomson joined Slipknot in the summer of 1996, replacing Craig Jones on guitar after he became the band's full-time sampler. The first Slipknot album on which Thomson performed was the 1999 self-titled debut. Speaking about the process of recording the album, he recalled in an interview for Revolver magazine that "It was a nightmarish hell to do that fucking record", primarily due to the group's lack of money, poor quality of food, and other band members' bad habits.

Upon joining the band, Thomson wore a hockey mask which he bought from a store, compared by author Joel McIver to that worn by Hannibal Lecter in the film The Silence of the Lambs. The guitarist's mask would remain much the same throughout his career, with only minor changes made for each album cycle, which he claimed was because he "pretty much nailed it ... for being able to get across how I am". Speaking in 2008, Thomson played down the amount of consideration which went into the mask's design and meaning, proclaiming that "I had my original latex hockey mask way back and then my leather one and I was using those designs and it morphed into what it is now. There isn't something crazy creative about it." Thomson also chose #7 in the band, claiming that it was his "lucky number".

Outside of Slipknot, Thomson has collaborated with several other bands. Along with bandmate Paul Gray, he was expected to appear on a Death tribute album organized by James Murphy. In 2007, he performed the second guitar solo on Malevolent Creation's "Deliver My Enemy", released on Doomsday X. Speaking about his appearance on the song, which was engineered in part by Slipknot DJ Sid Wilson, Thomson claimed that he was "proud beyond words to have been asked to be part of this recording". In 2011, he performed guest lead guitar on Necrophagia's album Deathtrip 69. Thomson is also featured in the music video for "No Pity on the Ants" by thrash metal band Lupara, directed by Frankie Nasso and released in 2007.

== Equipment ==
During the early 2000's and before signing with Ibanez, Thomson played signature model B.C. Rich guitars – mainly the Warlock, but also sporting the Rich Bich on occasion. His personal Warlock was a USA made Custom, with mahogany body, maple neck, and ebony fretboard. It sported the old style B.C. Rich "R" logo, and could be seen with either a gloss black finish with white binding, or red with contrasting black binding. It had custom "HATE" inlays at the fifth through second fretboard positions and "MICK" 12th fret inlay. There were no other fretboard markers. It had a hardtail bridge, dual EMG humbuckers in the bridge and neck position, and three-way pickup selector wired to a volume control. There was also an NJ Warlock Signature Series offered for retail sale. Visually, this version differed from his custom model in that it had a rosewood fretboard, the B.C. Rich script logo imprint on the headstock and "Mick #7" signature reproduced on the backside of the headstock, as well as a "Signature Series" 12th fret inlay.

Thomson is known for playing Ibanez MTM guitars both in the studio and on tour, all of which are handmade by the company's artist shop luthier Tak Hosono. The guitars feature Seymour Duncan EMTY Blackout pickups and d'Addario EXL117 strings. He began working with the company in 2003, during the recording process for Slipknot's third studio album Vol. 3: (The Subliminal Verses). His effects pedals include a Maxon OD820, a Death by Audio Fuzz War, an MXR Carbon Copy Delay, an Electro-Harmonix Bassballs Envelope Filter and a custom fuzz pedal made by his guitar technician Kevin Allen.

In July 2016, Jackson Guitars announced that Thomson had joined their artist roster. Speaking about joining the company, Thomson proclaimed that he was "immensely proud to be a part of the Jackson family", praising his custom Double Rhoads and Soloist models as "incredible". Thomson currently has three signature Jackson soloists, a limited edition USA, a standard USA, and an import, all featuring a reverse headstock, mahogany body, neck through graphite reinforced maple neck, locking nut, single volume and three position blade switch, and his signature Seymour Duncan EMTY Blackout pickups. The limited USA model comes with a fixed mounted Floyd Rose pro bridge, while the standard USA and the import come with a similar Jackson designed hardtail bridge with finetuners.

In March 2023, Thomson announced his latest endorsement with ESP Guitars and Fishman pickups.

== Personal life ==
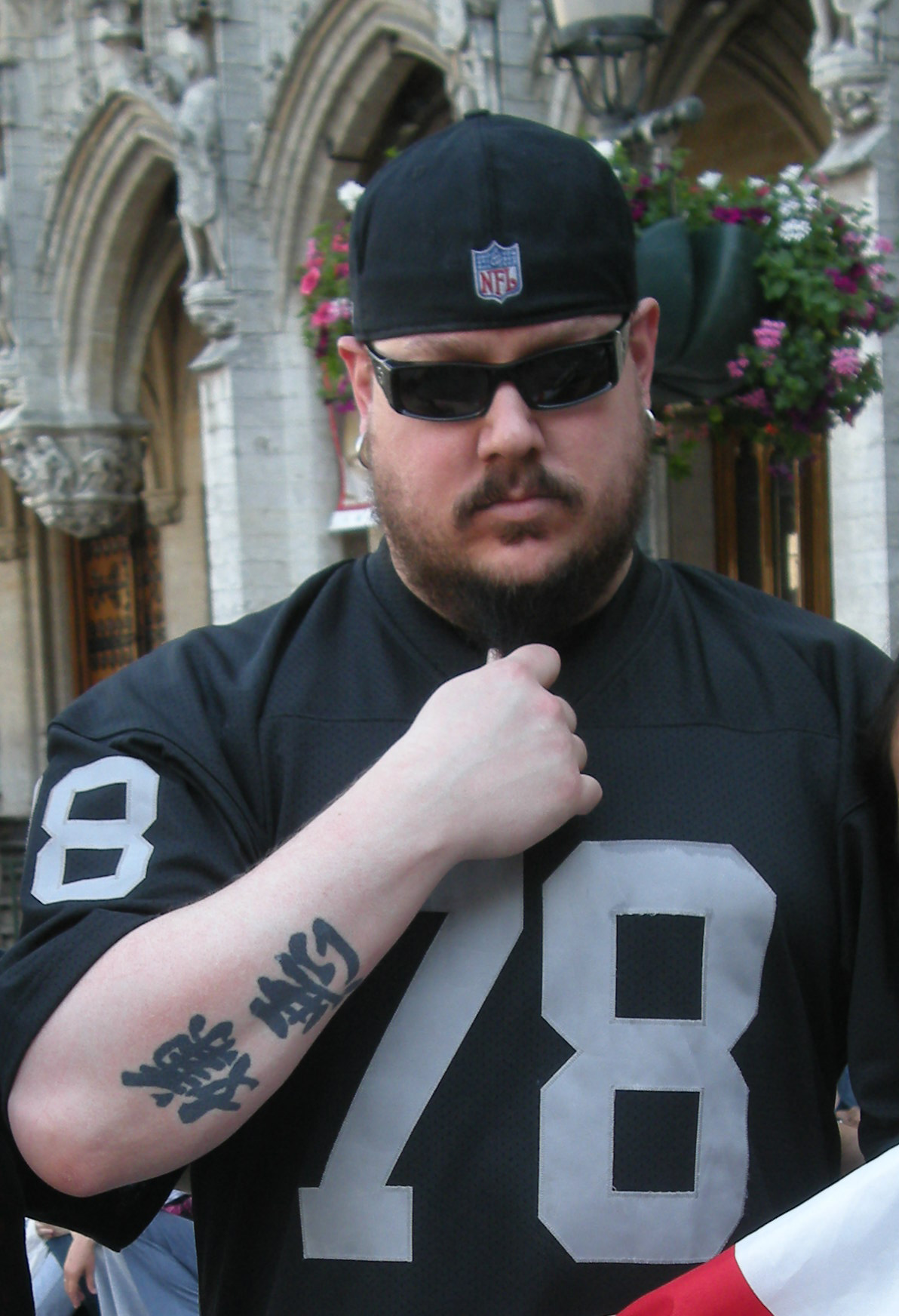
Thomson unmasked in 2011

Outside of performing with Slipknot, Thomson is known to keep a relatively low profile. Speaking on the band's 2006 video release Voliminal: Inside the Nine, he explained that "I like my quiet time; I like to be left the fuck alone", while pointing out that he "loves" being a part of the band. In an interview with Jon Wiederhorn for Revolver magazine about the making of Iowa, the guitarist explained that "On days off, you'd never see me out of my hotel room ... I'd rather be alone than be around a bunch of people that I don't care about, don't care about me or are fuckin' full of shit".

Thomson married his girlfriend Stacy Riley on October 5, 2012. He has a number of tattoos, including the word 'seven' on his left arm (reflecting his number in Slipknot), and the word 'hate' in Japanese writing on his right arm. Thomson is famously a devoted fan of the Las Vegas Raiders football team.

On March 11, 2015, Thomson was injured during a knife fight with his brother Andrew outside a house in his hometown of Clive, Iowa. It was reported by The Des Moines Register that both men were drunk at the time, and that the Slipknot guitarist suffered "serious but not life-threatening" injuries after being stabbed in the back of the head. Both Mick and Andrew were later charged with "disorderly conduct by fighting", after an investigation determined that both were responsible for the incident. Mick and Andrew were both hospitalised after the fight, but Slipknot vocalist Corey Taylor tweeted on the day of the incident to assure fans that Thomson would recover.

== Discography ==
=== with Slipknot ===
==== Studio albums ====
- Slipknot (1999)
- Iowa (2001)
- Vol. 3: (The Subliminal Verses) (2004)
- All Hope Is Gone (2008)
- .5: The Gray Chapter (2014)
- We Are Not Your Kind (2019)
- The End, So Far (2022)

=== with Malevolent Creation ===
==== Studio albums ====
- Doomsday X (2007) – "Deliver My Enemy"

=== with Necrophagia ===
==== Studio albums ====
- Deathtrip 69 (2011) – guest lead guitar parts

== Filmography ==
- 1999: Welcome to Our Neighborhood
- 2002: Disasterpieces
- 2002: Rollerball
- 2006: Voliminal: Inside the Nine
- 2008: Nine: The Making of "All Hope Is Gone"
- 2009: Of the (sic): Your Nightmares, Our Dreams
- 2010: (sic)nesses
- 2011: Goat
- 2017: Day of the Gusano: Live in Mexico

Preceded by Craig Jones	Slipknot guitarist 1996–present	Succeeded by none
