= Joey Jordison =

American musician (1975–2021)

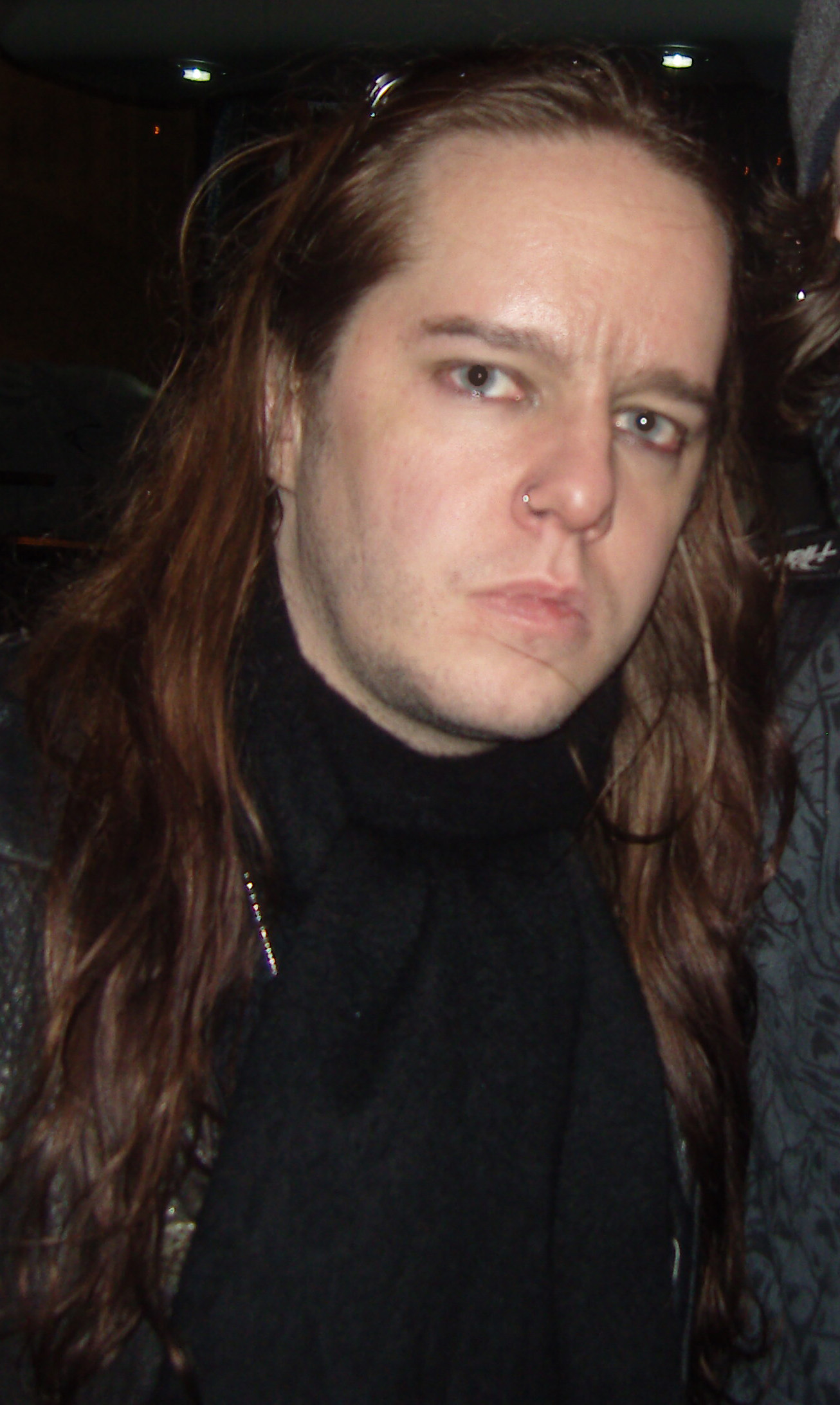
- Jordison in 2008

Background information
- Also known as: #1
- Born: Nathan Jonas Jordison; April 26, 1975; Des Moines, Iowa, U.S.
- Died: July 26, 2021 (aged 46) Waukee, Iowa, U.S.
- Genres: Alternative metal; horror punk; extreme metal; nu metal
- Occupations: Musician; songwriter
- Instruments: Drums; percussion; guitar; bass; keyboards; piano; vocals
- Years active: 1991–2021
- Formerly of: Vimic; Sinsaenum; Slipknot; Murderdolls; Scar the Martyr; Anal Blast
- Website: Official website; Tribute website by Jordison's family

Nathan Jonas "Joey" Jordison (April 26, 1975 – July 26, 2021) was an American musician. He was the original drummer of the heavy metal band Slipknot, in which he was designated #1, and the drummer and rhythm guitarist for the horror punk supergroup Murderdolls.

Jordison played in Slipknot from when it was founded in 1995 until December 2013. He was also the drummer and founder of Scar the Martyr, which formed in 2013 and disbanded in 2016. At the time of his death, Jordison was playing in the blackened death metal supergroup Sinsaenum.

With Slipknot, Jordison performed on the band's first four studio albums, and produced the 2005 live album 9.0: Live. Jordison performed with various other acts (including Rob Zombie, Metallica, Korn, and Ministry) and did session work.

== Early life ==
Jordison was born in Des Moines, Iowa, on April 26, 1975, to Steve and Jackie Jordison. He had two younger sisters. He grew up in a rural area outside of Waukee. He played guitar until receiving his first drum kit as a gift from his parents at age eight, and started his first band while in elementary school. Jordison was initially self-taught, but then worked with an instructor who taught him R&B and jazz techniques, to which he attributed his musical diversity and skill later in life.

Jordison's parents divorced when he was young. The children stayed with their mother. He formed the band Modifidious, in which he played drums. He later described them as "total speed-metal thrash". The band helped Jordison break new ground, playing live as support to local bands including Atomic Opera, featuring Jim Root, and Heads on the Wall, featuring Shawn Crahan. After many lineup changes (including Craig Jones and Josh Brainard) the band released two demos in 1993: Visceral and Mud Fuchia.

After leaving school, Jordison was hired by a local music store called Musicland. In March 1994, after a recommendation from his new friend, he got a job at a Sinclair garage in Urbandale. Jordison worked the night shift. In early 1995, Modifidious disbanded because of a shift in interest from thrash metal to death metal in America. Following this Jordison joined a local band called the Rejects as a guitarist, with whom he only played a couple of shows. Jordison was also involved in a band with future bandmate Paul Gray and vocalist Don Decker, named Anal Blast. Gray also attempted to recruit him for another band, Body Pit, but he declined the invitation to remain in the Rejects. During the forming period of Slipknot, Paul recruited Joey to join a punk rock band called the Have Nots in the Spring of 1996. Joey would leave the Have Nots in February 1997 to "focus on Slipknot" but instead reformed the Rejects, which would play Des Moines up until Slipknot left to record their 1999 self-titled debut album, which Paul played in after the Have Nots broke up.

== Career ==
=== Slipknot ===
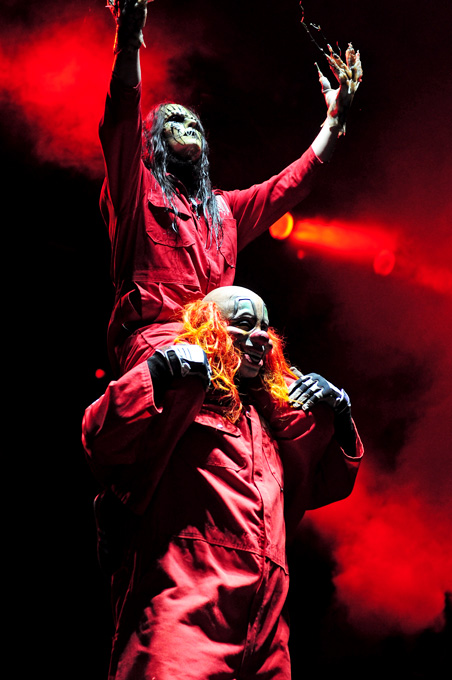
Jordison (top) with Slipknot in 2012

In September 1995, Paul Gray approached Jordison while he was working, offering him a position in a new project called the Pale Ones. Intrigued and at a point where he was "lost", Jordison attended rehearsals at Anders Colsefni's basement and immediately wanted to be part of this new band. Speaking of this moment he said, "I remember trying so hard not to smile, so I didn't look like I wanted to join, I remained poker-faced, but I thought they ruled." A lot of Slipknot's early development was discussed by band members while Jordison worked night shifts at Sinclair's garage. Of the eventual nine members, Joey was the third to join the band. Slipknot would become pioneers to the new wave of American heavy metal. Jordison was accompanied by two custom percussionists, giving their music a feel that Rolling Stone touted as "suffocating".

Each member of Slipknot is assigned a number; Joey was assigned "#1". Joey produced one album with Slipknot, the 2005 live album 9.0: Live. In August 2008, Jordison broke his ankle and Slipknot had to cancel some of its English tour dates. On August 22, 2009, Jordison was taken to the emergency room for a burst appendix, less than an hour before he was to take the stage for Auburn, Washington's KISW Pain in the Grass concert. As a result, Slipknot canceled following shows in August and September, to give Jordison time to recover.

On December 12, 2013, Slipknot announced through their official website that Jordison had left the band, citing personal reasons for his departure. In response, Jordison released a statement insisting that he had in fact been fired from the band and stated that Slipknot "has been my life for the last 18 years, and I would never abandon it, or my fans".

After years of both sides being silent and evasive as to the reasons for his leaving the band, Jordison revealed in June 2016 that he suffered from transverse myelitis, a neurological disease that cost him the ability to play the drums toward the end of his time with Slipknot.

=== Murderdolls ===
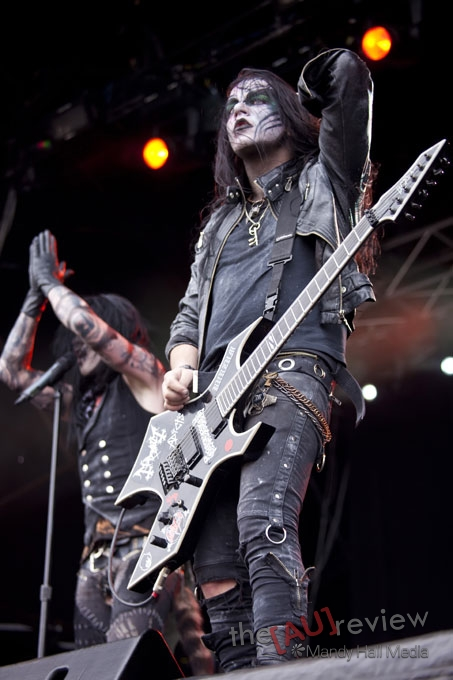
Jordison playing guitar with Murderdolls, Melbourne, 2011

While touring Ozzfest in 2001 to support Slipknot's studio album Iowa, Jordison met Tripp Eisen, then of Static-X; the two discussed forming a side project. In 2002, Jordison revived his band The Rejects, renaming them the Murderdolls. Jordison became the Murderdolls' guitarist, and he recruited Wednesday 13 of Frankenstein Drag Queens from Planet 13 to play bass. Wednesday eventually became a vocalist, while drummer Ben Graves and bassist Eric Griffin completed the band's lineup. Murderdolls signed with Roadrunner Records and released an EP entitled Right to Remain Violent in 2002. The band returned in August 2002 with their debut album Beyond the Valley of the Murderdolls. The band uses horror films, including Friday the 13th and Night of the Living Dead, as an inspiration for their lyrics. On October 30, 2002, the Murderdolls made an appearance on an episode of Dawson's Creek entitled "Living Dead Girl". The band reunited in 2010 with only Jordison and Wednesday 13 remaining from the original line-up. The band released their second studio album Women & Children Last on August 31, 2010. The band embarked on the extensive Women & Children Last World Tour performing shows alongside many notable acts such as Guns N' Roses and performing around the world. The tour was plagued with many problems including the cancellation of many shows and repeated incidents of Jordison storming off stage, most notably in Bordeaux, France (attributed to extreme tinnitus) and Perth, Western Australia. The tour finished on April 24, 2011. This was considered to be the band's last outing as Wednesday 13 confirmed the band's split in an interview in 2013.

=== Scar the Martyr ===
In April 2013 details emerged of a new band featuring Jordison, Jed Simon and Kris Norris. Little else was released except that Jordison had performed most instruments in this project and that Chris Vrenna and an unknown vocalist were to complete keyboard and vocal work, respectively. On June 21 the band was named Scar the Martyr and the vocalist named as Henry Derek. On May 5, 2016, Jordison announced that the project had been disbanded.

=== Vimic ===
On May 5, 2016, Jordison announced in an interview on Sirius XM that he had launched a new band called Vimic. In an interview with Wall of Sound in 2018, Jordison explained Vimic was "still 100% active". The album Open Your Omen was recorded around 2014, but wasn't released until 2025, after Jordison's death.

=== Sinsaenum ===
On May 20, 2016, Jordison announced a new extreme metal band Sinsaenum, dual fronted by vocalist Attila Csihar (of Mayhem and Sunn O)))) along with keyboardist Sean Zitarsky (of Chimaira and Dååth). The band also included Jordison on drum duties, DragonForce bassist Frédéric Leclercq on guitar, Stéphane Buriez from Loudblast on guitar, and Heimoth from the band Seth on bass. They announced the launch of their debut album Echoes of the Tortured on July 29, and released their first single "Army Of Chaos" on earMUSIC's YouTube channel. The second album, called Repulsion for Humanity, was released on August 10, 2018.

=== Other projects ===
==== Remixing and performances ====
In 2001, Jordison worked on a remix of "The Fight Song" by Marilyn Manson. Jordison also appeared in the music video for Manson's cover of "Tainted Love". Later in the year, Manson revealed that Jordison had been working with him on his album The Golden Age of Grotesque. Jordison had in fact worked on guitars but the track did not appear on the album. In 2004, Jordison appeared on OTEP's album House of Secrets, drumming on six tracks for the album. In 2008, Jordison appeared on Puscifer's album "V" is for Viagra. The Remixes, with a remix of the track "Drunk With Power". In 2010, Jordison recorded four additional songs with Rob Zombie for the re-release of his latest album Hellbilly Deluxe 2.

==== On tour ====
Jordison performed with other bands, solely as a touring member. While preparing for the Download Festival in 2004, Metallica drummer Lars Ulrich was hospitalized for an unknown illness. Metallica's vocalist James Hetfield searched amongst other bands performing at the festival to find a replacement for Ulrich; Jordison, Flemming Larsen (Ulrich's drum technician) and Dave Lombardo of Slayer volunteered. Jordison performed on 8 of the 13 songs that made up the set and was called the band's "hero of the day". In late 2004, Jordison performed with Satyricon on their tour of the United States when drummer Frost was refused entry into the country. The tour was cut short after guitarists Steinar Gundersen and Arnt Gronbech—who were also only touring members—were charged with sexually assaulting a fan in Toronto. In 2006, Jordison joined Ministry for their "MasterBaTour 2006", which consisted of sixty dates across the United States and Canada. He also appeared in the music video for their single "Lies Lies Lies". Korn recruited Jordison in 2007 to join them on tour when drummer David Silveria went on hiatus from the band. He also appeared in the music video for their single "Evolution". While touring with Korn, Jordison became the first musician to perform on five occasions at the Download Festival in England. Jordison also toured with Rob Zombie after Tommy Clufetos withdrew from the band in 2010.

==== Producing ====
In August 2004, Jordison became involved in Roadrunner United, a celebration of Roadrunner Records' 25th anniversary. As one of four "team captains" who wrote and produced material for the album, Jordison said of the experience, "I thought it was a great idea and was really excited about it, because it was a chance to work with a lot of artists that I really respected while I was growing up." In 2007, 3 Inches of Blood recruited Jordison to produce their album Fire Up the Blades. Jordison was a fan of the band and when he heard that Roadrunner wanted to have some demos produced he said; "I was the first one to jump at it, I'm like; 'I want this fucking band'." From these demos the label commissioned a record. Vocalist Jamie Hooper said of Jordison, "he's an amazing producer".

== Influences ==
Jordison was known for playing technical drum parts, many of which drew influence from thrash metal and would incorporate blast beats and fills played at high tempos. Despite this, Drumeo stated that Jordison would simplify his drum parts in certain sections of songs to "elevate" other parts in the instrumentation.

Jordison cited Neil Peart of Rush, Keith Moon of the Who, John Bonham of Led Zeppelin, Peter Criss of Kiss, Gene Krupa, and Buddy Rich as his main influences. He said, "I grew up listening to Mötley Crüe's Too Fast for Love and Shout at the Devil." He also cited Lars Ulrich (of Metallica), Charlie Benante (of Anthrax), Vinnie Paul (of Pantera), and Dave Lombardo (formerly of Slayer) as other influence on his drumming. Jordison also held Dale Crover of Melvins in high esteem.

== Equipment ==
Jordison used Pearl drums, hardware, rack system, pedals and percussion, Paiste cymbals, Remo Drumheads, Promark drumsticks, ddrum triggers and Roland electronics.

== Illness and death ==
In a 2016 Metal Hammer interview, Jordison talked about suffering from acute transverse myelitis. Its symptoms started in 2010 while touring with Murderdolls, but the disease was diagnosed long after. This progressed to the loss of the use of his left leg. The neurological disease temporarily cost him the use of his legs. He recovered with the aid of medical help and physical therapy, with his trainer Caleb.

Jordison died in his sleep on July 26, 2021, at the age of 46. A cause of death was not announced.

== Awards and recognition ==
In August 2010, Jordison was voted the best drummer of the previous 25 years by readers of Rhythm magazine, ahead of drummers such as Mike Portnoy, Neil Peart, and Phil Collins. When asked to comment on the poll, Jordison said: "I'm at a loss for words. This is beyond unbelievable. Something like this reminds me every day why I continue to do this."

In September 2013, Jordison was named the world's greatest metal drummer by readers of Loudwire.

In 2016, Jordison was honored with The Golden God Award at the Metal Hammer Golden Gods Awards.

Following Jordison’s death in 2021, tributes were shared by several musicians including Mike Portnoy, Alex Skolnick of Testament, Fred Durst of Limp Bizkit, Dave Lombardo, Lars Ulrich, Ben Thatcher of Royal Blood, and multiple others. Stewart Copeland said the "sadly departed" Jordison was one of the best younger drummers he'd ever seen, adding "Joey Jordison [was] doing things with his feet that I aspire to with my hands.

In 2022, Slipknot dedicated their seventh studio album The End, So Far in memory of Jordison.

== Discography ==
=== with Modifidious ===
- Drown (1993)
- Submitting to Detriment (1993)
- Visceral (1993)
- Mud Fuchia (1994)
- Sprawl (1994)

=== with the Have Nots ===
- Forgetting Yesterday and Beating You with Kindness (1996)

=== with Slipknot ===
- Mate. Feed. Kill. Repeat. (1996, demo)
- Slipknot demo (1998)
- Slipknot (1999)
- Welcome to Our Neighborhood (1999, video)
- Iowa (2001)
- Disasterpieces (2002, video)
- Vol. 3: (The Subliminal Verses) (2004)
- 9.0 Live (2005, live album)
- Voliminal: Inside the Nine (2006, video)
- All Hope Is Gone (2008)
- (sic)nesses (2010, video)
- Antennas to Hell (2012, compilation album)

=== with Murderdolls ===
- Right to Remain Violent (EP) (2002)
- Beyond the Valley of the Murderdolls (2002)
- Women and Children Last (2010)

=== with Roadrunner United ===
- The All-Star Sessions (2005)
- The Concert (2008)

=== with the Rejects ===
- Love Songs for People Who Hate (2012)
- Strung Out, Pissed Off and Ready To Die (2014)

=== with Scar the Martyr ===
- Revolver EP (2013)
- Metal Hammer EP (2013)
- Scar the Martyr (2013)

=== with Sinsaenum ===
- Sinsaenum (EP) (2016)
- A Taste of Sin (EP) (2016)
- Echoes of the Tortured (2016)
- Ashes (EP) (2017)
- Repulsion for Humanity (2018)

=== with Vimic ===
- Open your Omen (recorded 2016-released 2025)

=== As featured artist ===
Year	Artist	Album	Track(s)	Position	Ref
2001	Marilyn Manson	The Fight Song (Single)	"The Fight Song" (Slipknot Remix)	Remixing	
2003	Deicide	The Best of Deicide	—	Liner notes	
2004	Otep	House of Secrets	"Warhead", "Buried Alive", "Sepsis", "Hooks & Splinters", "Nein", "Self-Made"	Drums	
2005	Necrophagia	Harvest Ritual Volume I	"Stitch Her Further"	Vocals, lyrics	
2007	3 Inches Of Blood	Fire Up the Blades	—	Production, arrangement, writing, percussion	
2008	Puscifer	"V" Is for Viagra. The Remixes	"Drunk With Power" (Hungover And Hostile In Hannover Mix)	Remixing	
2010	Rob Zombie	Hellbilly Deluxe 2 (Reissue)	"Devil's Hole Girls and the Big Revolution", "Everything Is Boring", "Michael"	Drums	
2013	Ministry	Enjoy The Quiet - Live At Wacken 2012 (Live)	Bonus Disc: Wacken 2006	Drums	
"—" denotes a recording that did not chart or was not released in that territory.

== Filmography ==
Year	Film	Character	Director	Ref
1999	Welcome to Our Neighborhood	Self	Thomas Mignone	
2001	We Sold Our Souls for Rock 'n Roll	Self	Penelope Spheeris	
2002	Rollerball	Self	John McTiernan	
2002	Dawson's Creek ("Living Dead Girl" episode)	Self	Les Sheldon	
2002	Disasterpieces	Self	Matthew Amos	
2005	Metal: A Headbanger's Journey	Self	Sam Dunn	
2006	Voliminal: Inside the Nine	Self	Shawn Crahan	
2008	Roadrunner United: The Concert DVD	Self	Todd Bell and Nicholas Kleczewski	
2009	Of the (sic): Your Nightmares, Our Dreams	Self	Shawn Crahan	
2010	(sic)nesses	Self	Shawn Crahan	
2011	GOAT	Self	Shawn Crahan	

== Bibliography ==
- Arnopp, Jason (2001). Slipknot: Inside the Sickness, Behind the Masks. Ebury. ISBN 0-09-187933-7.

Preceded by Shawn "Clown" Crahan	Slipknot drummer 1995–2013	Succeeded by Jay Weinberg
