= Paul Gray (American musician) =

American bassist (1972–2010)

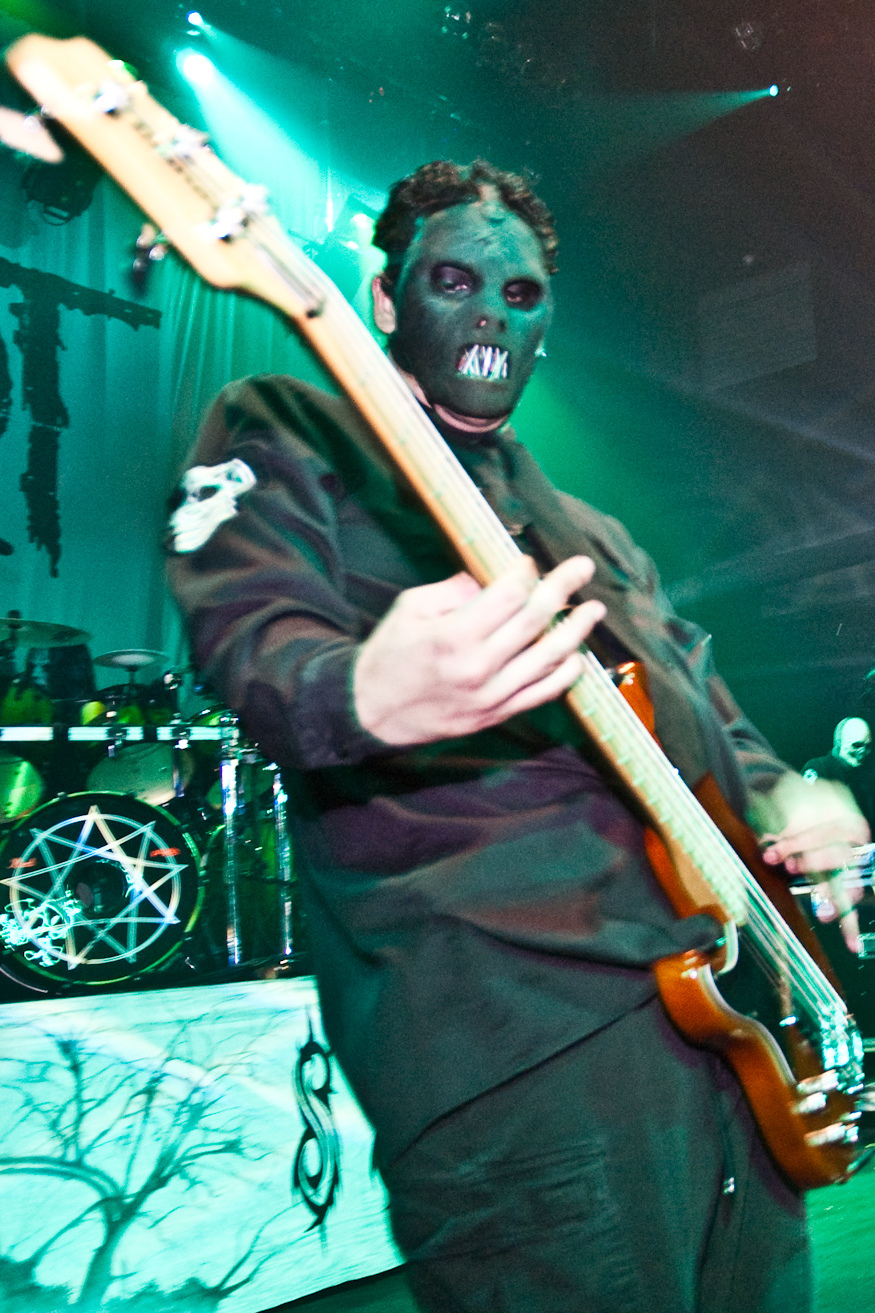
- Gray performing with Slipknot in 2005

Background information
- Also known as: #2; The Pig
- Born: Paul Dedrick Gray; April 8, 1972; Los Angeles, California, U.S.
- Origin: Des Moines, Iowa, U.S.
- Died: May 24, 2010 (aged 38) Urbandale, Iowa, U.S.
- Genres: Heavy metal; nu metal; alternative metal; death metal
- Occupation: Musician
- Instrument: Bass
- Years active: 1991–2010
- Formerly of: Slipknot; Anal Blast; Vexx; Body Pit; Inveigh Catharsis; The Have Nots; Reggie and the Full Effect; Hail!

Paul Dedrick Gray (April 8, 1972 – May 24, 2010), also known as the Pig, was an American musician who was the bassist, backing vocalist, and co-founder of the nu metal band Slipknot, in which he was designated #2.

== Early life and career ==
Paul Dedrick Gray was born in Los Angeles, California. Later his family relocated to Des Moines, Iowa. He played guitar but switched to bass after he relocated to Iowa. In his youth, Gray performed in bands such as Sudden Infant Death Syndrome, Anal Blast, Vexx, Body Pit, The Have Nots and Inveigh Catharsis.

At the time of his death, he was one of three original members of Slipknot remaining in the band, and the only one who had maintained his original role in the band due to Clown's switch from main drums to percussion during the early days. He was one of the two members not born in Iowa (the other is Jim Root, who was born in Las Vegas). In 2010, Slipknot released the Download 2009 performance on DVD in memory of Gray.

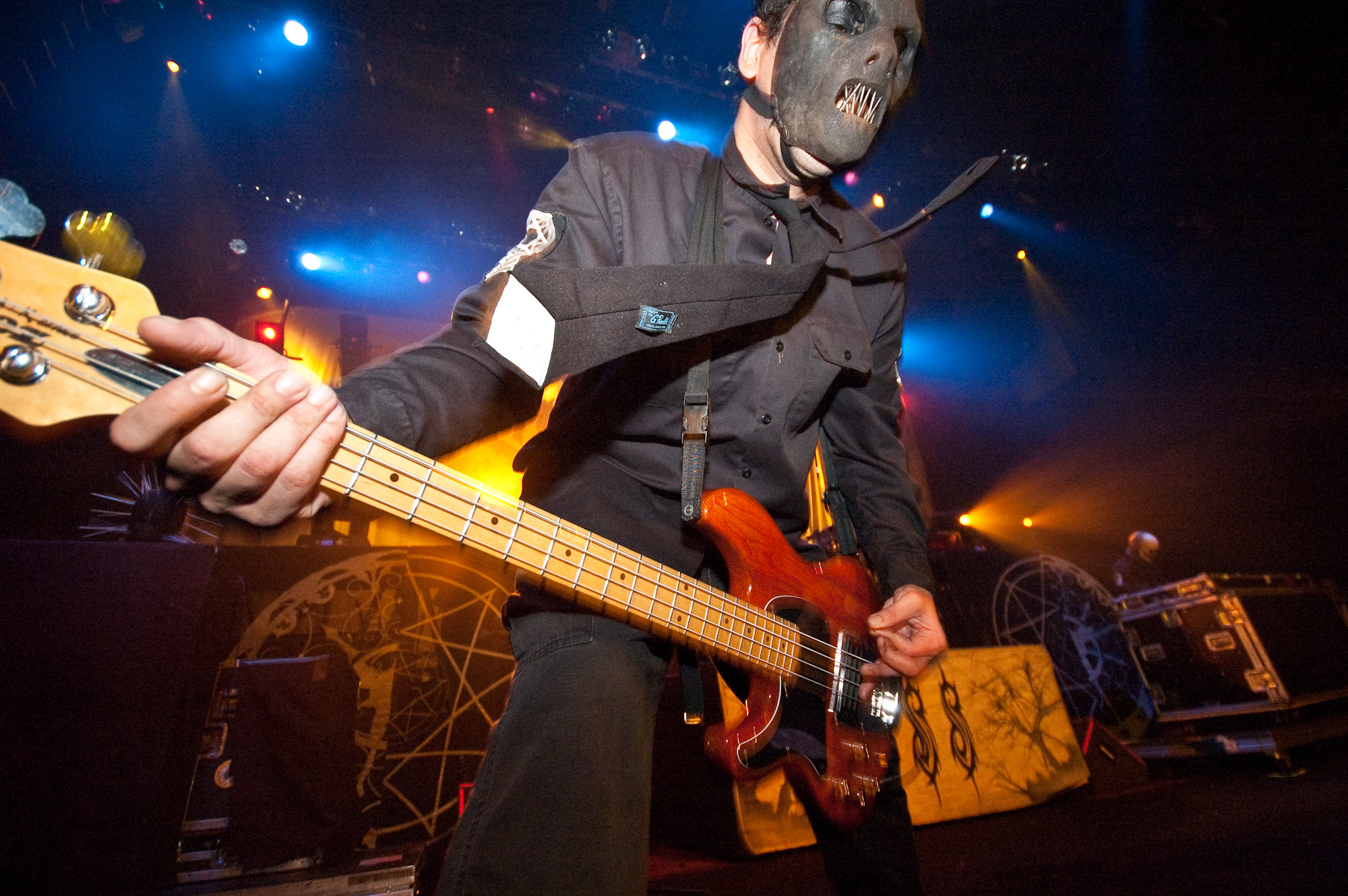
Gray with Slipknot in 2005

Besides Slipknot, Gray filled in as bassist for Unida during their 2003 tour, appeared on the album Worse Than a Fairy Tale by the band Drop Dead, Gorgeous, toured briefly with Reggie and the Full Effect and appeared on the Roadrunner United project, performing bass on "The Enemy" and "Baptized in the Redemption" from the project's album The All-Star Sessions.

An award was named after Paul titled "Paul Gray: Best Bassist of the Year", as a tribute to Paul. Slipknot presented the award to Nikki Sixx, of Mötley Crüe and Sixx A.M.

== Death ==
On May 24, 2010, The Des Moines Register reported that Gray was found dead in Room 431 at the TownePlace Suites in Urbandale, Iowa at about 10:50 a.m. local time. He was 38 years old.

In a 911 call, obtained by TMZ, one of the hotel's proprietors said that a hypodermic syringe was found next to Gray's bed and many pills were apparently scattered across the room.

On June 21, 2010, the autopsy results showed that Gray had died of an overdose of morphine and fentanyl, and that he had also developed "substantial heart disease". The autopsy also revealed traces of the anti-anxiety medicine Xanax in his system.

=== Aftermath ===
On the day after Gray's death, May 25, 2010, the band, without their masks, held a formal press conference in Des Moines, Iowa. They did not take any questions from the media. The band, along with Gray's brother, Tony, and wife, Brenna, paid tribute to him.

He was kind of the person in the band that really wanted everybody in the band to always get along and just concentrate on the band. He was a really great friend and just a great person. He's going to be sadly missed, and the world is going to be a different place without him.

— Shawn Crahan

The only way I can sum up Paul Gray – is "love". Everything he did, he did for everyone around him. Whether he knew you or not. And that's what he's left behind for us – his absolute love. I will miss him with every fiber of my heart. As will everybody at this table; and everyone who knew him. He was the best of us.

— Corey Taylor

A private funeral was held on May 28, 2010. Gray was interred at Highland Memory Gardens Cemetery in Des Moines, Iowa. On November 8, 2010, items that decorated Gray's grave, including a Buddha statue and gargoyle statue, were stolen. The band responded to this event with a post on their MySpace and Facebook page, asking the robbers to return the stolen items and appealing for information from the public.

On July 30, Paul Gray was posthumously awarded the Kerrang! "Services to Metal" award, which was collected by his Slipknot bandmate Corey Taylor on his behalf.

In one concert, Korn dedicated a performance of "Did My Time" to Gray.

Slipknot's former guitarist Donnie Steele filled in on bass guitar for Gray on Slipknot's 2011 Summer tour. Slipknot shows during this time featured Paul's jumpsuit and self-titled album era pig mask on a stand, along with a bass guitar standing next to it. Fans honored Gray with a two-minute silence during the band's headline set at Sonisphere Festival, Knebworth.

Corey Taylor also got a tattoo of Gray and his number on the back of his left leg, which was documented in the television series NY Ink, during the second episode of season one.

=== Trial against physician ===
In September 2012, Gray's physician Daniel Baldi was charged with involuntary manslaughter relating to Gray's death, as well as the deaths of at least seven others. He was accused of continually writing high-dose prescription narcotics to Gray from December 27, 2005 until his death, despite knowing Gray's history of drug addiction and abuse. The doctor appeared in court on September 27, 2012 to face the charges, to which he pleaded not guilty. On May 1, 2014, jurors found Daniel Baldi not guilty on all seven counts of involuntary manslaughter following two days of deliberation. Gray's wife Brenna had testified during the two-week-long trial that Baldi prescribed the anti-anxiety drug Xanax to her husband, despite knowing he was addicted to the prescription medicine.

In January 2018, the family received an out of court settlement from a civil lawsuit they had filed against Baldi and his former employers. Two months later, the Iowa Board of Pharmacy permanently banned Baldi from being able to prescribe, administer, or dispense controlled substances for the treatment of chronic pain.

== Personal life ==
Gray and his wife Brenna have a daughter, who was born on August 17, 2010, a few months after his death in May.

== Discography ==
=== with Vexx ===
- Shadow of Reality (1991)

=== with Anal Blast ===
- Demo Tape (1991)
- Pussy Blood Pentagram (1994)

=== with Inveigh Catharsis ===
- Inveigh Catharsis (1992)

=== with Body Pit ===
- Basement Demo (1994)

=== With the Have Nots ===
- Forgetting Yesterday and Beating You With Kindness (1996)

=== with Slipknot ===
==== Studio albums ====
- Slipknot (1999)
- Iowa (2001)
- Vol. 3: (The Subliminal Verses) (2004)
- All Hope Is Gone (2008)

==== Other media ====
- Mate. Feed. Kill. Repeat (1996 album)
- Welcome to Our Neighborhood (1999 video album)
- Disasterpieces (2002 video album)
- 9.0: Live (2005 live album)
- Voliminal: Inside the Nine (2006 live album)
- Nine: The Making of "All Hope Is Gone" (2008)
- Behind the Player: Paul Gray (2008)
- Of the (sic): Your Nightmares, Our Dreams (2009)
- (sic)nesses (2010 video album)
- Antennas to Hell (compilation album 2012)
- Live at MSG (2023 live album)

=== Guest appearances ===
- The All-Star Sessions (Roadrunner United) (2005)
- Worse Than a Fairy Tale (Drop Dead, Gorgeous) (2007)
- The Concert (Roadrunner United) (2008)
- Last Stop: Crappy Town (Reggie and the Full Effect) (2008)
- Sid (posthumous) (2011)

== Filmography ==
- 2002: Rollerball

== See also ==
- Purdue Pharma

Slipknot bassist 1995–2010	Succeeded by Donnie Steele
