= List of Slipknot band members =

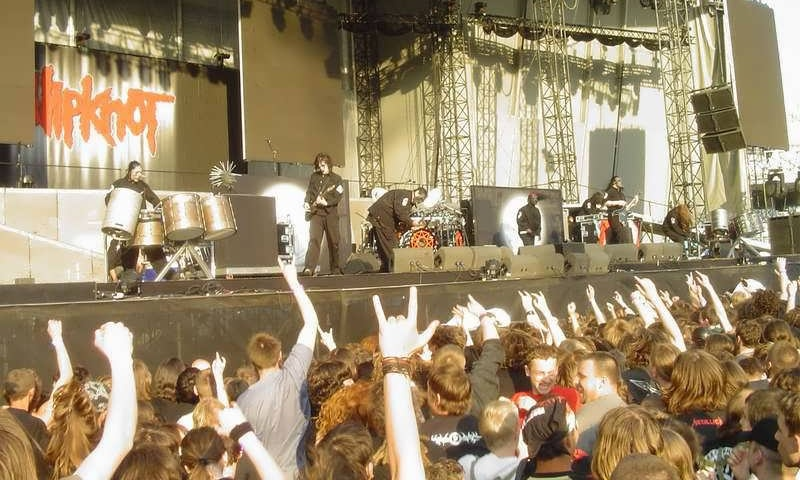
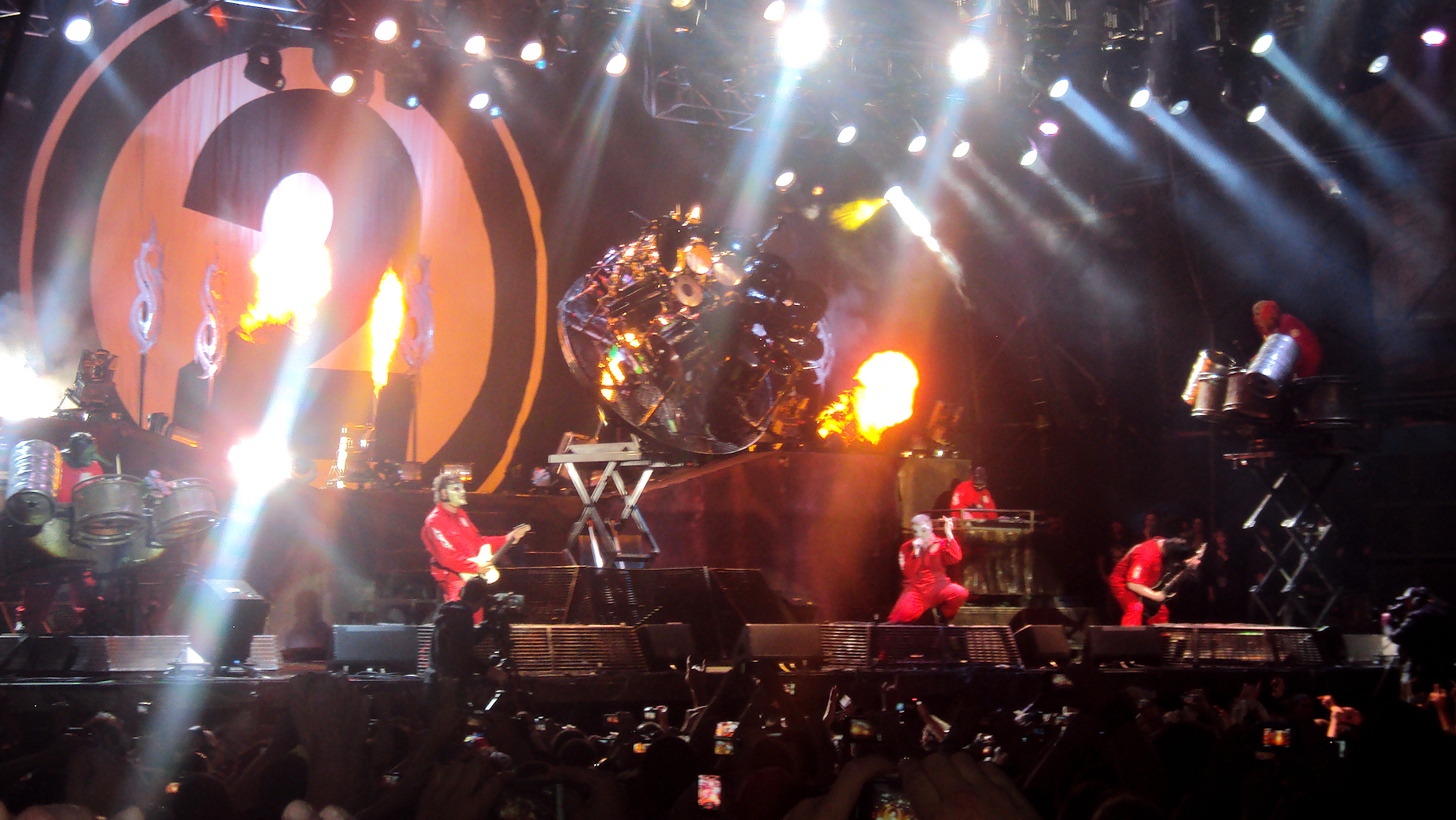
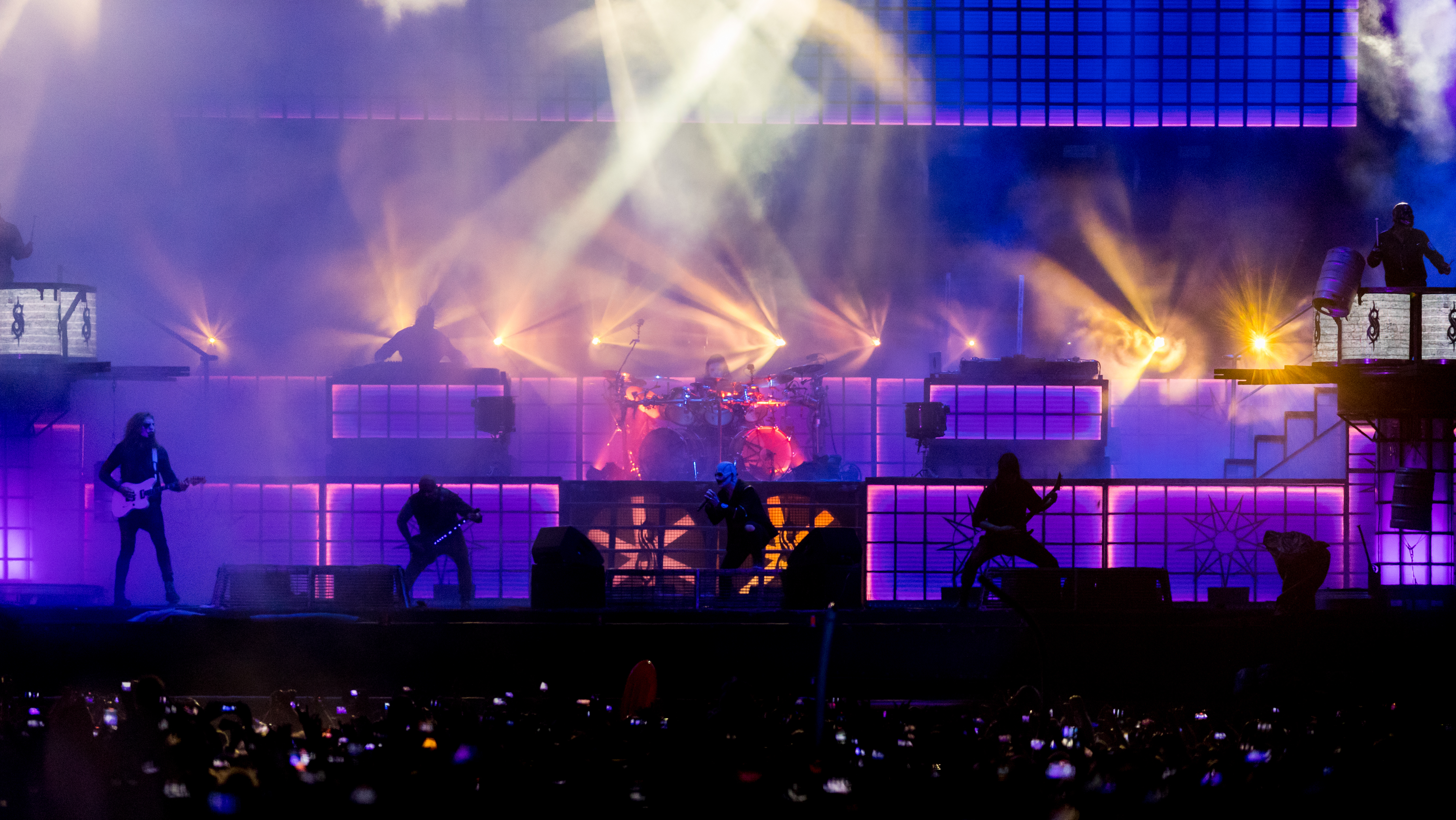
Three line-ups of Slipknot 2005, 2012 and 2022.

Slipknot is an American alternative metal band, founded in 1995 by percussionist Shawn Crahan, bassist Paul Gray and vocalist Anders Colsefni. The band currently consists of Crahan alongside guitarist Mick Thomson (since 1996), vocalist Corey Taylor (since 1997), guitarist Jim Root (since 1999), bassist Alessandro Venturella (since 2014), percussionist/keyboardist Michael Pfaff (since 2019), an unknown touring musician who plays samples, keyboards and percussion (since 2023) and drummer Eloy Casagrande (since 2024).

== History ==
Members of Slipknot had played together in various metal bands since 1991. In January 1995, Colsefni, Crahan and Gray decided to form a new band. They were soon joined by guitarist Donnie Steele and drummer Joey Jordison, with Jordison also inviting rhythm guitarist Josh Brainard. In late 1995, the group changed their name to Slipknot. In February 1996, after recording their debut album Mate. Feed. Kill. Repeat., Steele left the band over disagreements over lyrical content. Craig Jones joined as Steele's replacement, although he soon moved to samples, media and keyboards. Mick Thomson joined as Jones' replacement on guitar.

In early 1997 Corey Taylor joined as lead vocalist, and Colsefni moved to backing vocals, although he would depart by September 1997. Greg Welts joined as Colsefni's replacement. In early 1998, DJ Sid Wilson also joined the band, bringing the number of members to nine. Welts was fired in July 1998, shortly before the band signed a record deal. Brandon Darner was Welts' touring replacement although he departed soon after and was replaced by Chris Fehn. Brainard left during Christmas 1998, his replacement was Jim Root who joined the following year. This line-up would stay together for over 10 years.

In May 2010, Paul Gray died. In March 2011, former guitarist Donnie Steele rejoined as his touring replacement. In December 2013, Jordison was fired from the band. In October 2014, the band began touring with a new drummer and bassist, replacing Jordison and Steele respectively. These musicians were later revealed to be Jay Weinberg and Alessandro Venturella respectively.

In March 2019, Chris Fehn filed a lawsuit against the band due to withheld payments. He was fired from the band later that month. He was replaced by a musician that was later revealed to be Michael Pfaff. Craig Jones parted ways with the band in June 2023, he was replaced the same day by a musician whose identity has not been revealed, although they are rumoured to be either Zac Baird (ex-Korn), Nathan Church (ex-Downthesun) or Jeff Karnowski (ex-Dirty Little Rabbits). The band also parted ways with Weinberg that November. Eloy Casagrande joined as drummer the following year, leaving Sepultura to do so.

On July 31, 2026, TMZ reported that Wilson was permanently removed from Slipknot. On August 14, 2026, Slipknot announced that they had parted ways with Wilson; the post was deleted shortly thereafter.

== Members ==
=== Current members ===
Image	No./Int.	Name	Years active	Instruments	Release contributions
	#6	Shawn "Clown" Crahan	1995–present	drums (1995); percussion; backing and occasional lead vocals (1995–present)	all releases
	#7	Mick Thomson	1996–present	guitar	all releases except Mate. Feed. Kill. Repeat. (1996)
	#8	Corey Taylor	1997–present	lead vocals	all releases except Mate. Feed. Kill. Repeat. (1996)
	#4	Jim Root	1999–present	guitar; bass (studio 2011–2014)	all releases except Mate. Feed. Kill. Repeat. (1996)
	V	Alessandro "Vman" Venturella	2015–present (touring 2014–2015)	bass; keyboards; (studio 2018–2019)	all releases since .5: The Gray Chapter (2014), except Live at MSG (2023)
		Michael "Tortilla Man" Pfaff	2022–present (touring 2019–2022)	percussion; backing vocals; keyboards (2022–present)	all releases since The End, So Far (2022), except Live at MSG (2023)
		Eloy Casagrande	2024–present	drums	Arsenal (2026)

=== Former members ===
Image	No./Int.	Name	Years active	Instruments	Release contributions
	#2	Paul Gray	1995–2010 (until his death)	bass; backing vocals	all releases from Mate. Feed. Kill. Repeat. (1996) to All Hope Is Gone (2008); Live at MSG (2023)
		Anders Colsefni	1995–1997	lead vocals (1995–1997); backing vocals (1997); percussion	Mate. Feed. Kill. Repeat. (1996)
		Donnie Steele	1995–1996; 2011–2014 (touring/session)	guitar (1995–1996); bass (2011–2014)	Mate. Feed. Kill. Repeat. (1996); .5: The Gray Chapter (2014)
	#1	Joey Jordison	1995–2013 (died 2021)	drums	all releases from Mate. Feed. Kill. Repeat. (1996) to All Hope Is Gone (2008); Live at MSG (2023)
	#4	Josh "Gnar" Brainard	1995–1998	guitar; backing vocals; percussion (1995–1996)	Mate. Feed. Kill. Repeat. (1996); Slipknot (1999)
	#5	Craig "133" Jones	1996–2023	guitar (1996); samplers; media (1996–2023); keyboards (2003–2023)	all releases from Mate. Feed. Kill. Repeat. (1996) to Live at MSG (2023)
	#3	Greg "Cuddles" Welts	1997–1998	percussion; backing vocals	Slipknot (1999)
	#0	Sid Wilson	1998–2026	turntables; keyboards (2008–2026)	all releases from Slipknot (1999) to Adderall (2023)
	#3	Chris Fehn	1998–2019	percussion; backing vocals	all releases from Iowa (2001) to .5: The Gray Chapter (2014); All Out Life (2018); Live at MSG (2023)
	J	Jay Weinberg	2015–2023 (touring 2014–2015)	drums	all releases from .5: The Gray Chapter (2014) to Adderall (2023)

=== Touring musicians ===
Image	Name	Years active	Instruments	Notes
	Brandon Darner	1998	percussion; backing vocals	for one show on August 15, 1998.
	Mark Morton	2005	bass	fill in for Paul Gray at The Subliminal Verses North American leg.
	Phil Sgrosso	2012	guitar	fill in for Jim Root at Mayhem Festival.
	Nick Hipa	2012	guitar	fill in for Jim Root at Mayhem Festival.
	Unknown musician	2023–present	samples; media; keyboards; percussion	

== Line-ups ==
Period	Members	Releases
September 1995 (The Pale Ones)	Shawn Crahan – drums; Paul Gray – bass, backing vocals; Anders Colsefni – lead vocals; Donnie Steele – guitar	none – rehearsals only
September – October 1995 (The Pale Ones)	Shawn Crahan – percussion, backing vocals; Paul Gray – bass, backing vocals; Anders Colsefni – lead vocals, percussion; Donnie Steele – guitar; Joey Jordison – drums	none – rehearsals only
October 1995 – February 1996 (The Pale Ones, Meld for November debut show, Slipknot from c. December 1995)	Shawn Crahan – percussion, backing vocals; Paul Gray – bass, backing vocals; Anders Colsefni – lead vocals, percussion; Donnie Steele – guitar; Joey Jordison – drums; Josh Brainard – guitar, backing vocals, percussion	Mate. Feed. Kill. Repeat. (1996)
February – July 1996 (Slipknot, Pygsystem for two shows in June)	Shawn Crahan – percussion, backing vocals; Paul Gray – bass, backing vocals; Anders Colsefni – lead vocals, percussion; Joey Jordison – drums; Josh Brainard – guitar, backing vocals, percussion; Craig Jones – guitar	Mate. Feed. Kill. Repeat. (1996)
July 1996 – early 1997	Shawn Crahan – percussion, backing vocals; Paul Gray – bass, backing vocals; Anders Colsefni – lead vocals, percussion; Joey Jordison – drums; Josh Brainard – guitar, backing vocals; Craig Jones – samples, media; Mick Thomson – guitar	Mate. Feed. Kill. Repeat. (1996)
Early – September 1997	Shawn Crahan – percussion, backing vocals; Paul Gray – bass, backing vocals; Anders Colsefni – percussion, backing vocals; Joey Jordison – drums; Josh Brainard – guitar, backing vocals; Craig Jones – samples, media; Mick Thomson – guitar; Corey Taylor – lead vocals	none
September 1997 – early 1998	Shawn Crahan – percussion, backing vocals; Paul Gray – bass, backing vocals; Joey Jordison – drums; Josh Brainard – guitar, backing vocals; Craig Jones – samples, media; Mick Thomson – guitar; Corey Taylor – lead vocals; Greg Welts – percussion, backing vocals	none
Early – July 1998	Shawn Crahan – percussion, backing vocals; Paul Gray – bass, backing vocals; Joey Jordison – drums; Josh Brainard – guitar, backing vocals; Craig Jones – samples, media; Mick Thomson – guitar; Corey Taylor – lead vocals; Greg Welts – percussion, backing vocals; Sid Wilson – turntables	"Spit It Out" on Slipknot (1999) and Antennas to Hell (2012)
July – September 1998	Shawn Crahan – percussion, backing vocals; Paul Gray – bass, backing vocals; Joey Jordison – drums; Josh Brainard – guitar, backing vocals; Craig Jones – samples, media; Mick Thomson – guitar; Corey Taylor – lead vocals; Sid Wilson – turntables; Brandon Darner – percussion, backing vocals (touring only)	Slipknot (1999) all but two tracks
September – December 1998	Shawn Crahan – percussion, backing vocals; Paul Gray – bass, backing vocals; Joey Jordison – drums; Josh Brainard – guitar, backing vocals; Craig Jones – samples, media; Mick Thomson – guitar; Corey Taylor – lead vocals; Sid Wilson – turntables; Chris Fehn – percussion, backing vocals	Slipknot (1999) one track; Antennas to Hell (2012) four tracks
January 1999 – May 2010	Shawn Crahan – percussion, backing vocals; Paul Gray – bass, backing vocals; Joey Jordison – drums; Craig Jones – samples, media, keyboards; Mick Thomson – guitar; Corey Taylor – lead vocals; Sid Wilson – turntables, keyboards; Chris Fehn – percussion, backing vocals; Jim Root – guitar	"Purity" and "Me Inside" on Slipknot (1999); Iowa (2001); Vol. 3: (The Subliminal Verses) (2004); 9.0: Live (2005); All Hope Is Gone (2008); Antennas to Hell (2012) remaining thirteen tracks; Live at MSG (2023)
May 2010 – July 2011	Shawn Crahan – percussion, backing vocals; Joey Jordison – drums; Craig Jones – samples, media, keyboards; Mick Thomson – guitar; Corey Taylor – lead vocals; Sid Wilson – turntables, keyboards; Chris Fehn – percussion, backing vocals; Jim Root – guitar	none
July 2011 – December 2013	Shawn Crahan – percussion, backing vocals; Joey Jordison – drums; Craig Jones – samples, media, keyboards; Mick Thomson – guitar; Corey Taylor – lead vocals; Sid Wilson – turntables, keyboards; Chris Fehn – percussion, backing vocals; Jim Root – guitar, bass; Donnie Steele – bass (touring)	.5: The Gray Chapter (2014) unspecified tracks
December 2013 – May 2014	Shawn Crahan – percussion, backing vocals; Craig Jones – samples, media, keyboards; Mick Thomson – guitar; Corey Taylor – lead vocals; Sid Wilson – turntables, keyboards; Chris Fehn – percussion, backing vocals; Jim Root – guitar, bass; Donnie Steele – bass (touring)	none
March 2014 – March 2019	Shawn Crahan – percussion, backing vocals; Craig Jones – samples, media, keyboards; Mick Thomson – guitar; Corey Taylor – lead vocals; Sid Wilson – turntables, keyboards; Chris Fehn – percussion, backing vocals; Jim Root – guitar; Jay Weinberg – drums (touring only till 2015); Alessandro Venturella – bass, keyboards (touring only till 2015)	.5: The Gray Chapter (2014) unspecified tracks; Day of the Gusano: Live in Mexico (2017); We Are Not Your Kind (2019) one track
June 2019 – June 2023	Shawn Crahan – percussion, backing vocals; Craig Jones – samples, media, keyboards; Mick Thomson – guitar; Corey Taylor – lead vocals; Sid Wilson – turntables, keyboards; Jim Root – guitar; Jay Weinberg – drums; Alessandro Venturella – bass; Michael Pfaff – percussion, backing vocals, keyboards (touring only till 2022)	We Are Not Your Kind (2019); The End, So Far (2022); Adderall (2023)
June – November 2023	Shawn Crahan – percussion, backing vocals; Mick Thomson – guitar; Corey Taylor – lead vocals; Sid Wilson – turntables, keyboards; Jim Root – guitar; Jay Weinberg – drums; Alessandro Venturella – bass; Michael Pfaff – percussion, keyboards, backing vocals; Unknown musician – samples, media, keyboards, percussion (touring)	none – live performances only
November 2023 – April 2024	Shawn Crahan – percussion, backing vocals; Mick Thomson – guitar; Corey Taylor – lead vocals; Sid Wilson – turntables, keyboards; Jim Root – guitar; Alessandro Venturella – bass; Michael Pfaff – percussion, keyboards, backing vocals; Unknown musician – samples, media, keyboards, percussion (touring)	none
April 2024 – August 2026	Shawn Crahan – percussion, backing vocals; Mick Thomson – guitar; Corey Taylor – lead vocals; Sid Wilson – turntables, keyboards; Jim Root – guitar; Alessandro Venturella – bass; Michael Pfaff – percussion, keyboards, backing vocals; Unknown musician – samples, media, keyboards, percussion (touring); Eloy Casagrande – drums	none
August 2026 – present	Shawn Crahan – percussion, backing vocals; Mick Thomson – guitar; Corey Taylor – lead vocals; Jim Root – guitar; Alessandro Venturella – bass; Michael Pfaff – percussion, keyboards, backing vocals; Unknown musician – samples, media, keyboards, percussion (touring); Eloy Casagrande – drums	Arsenal (2026)
