= The Chapeltown Rag =

Single by Slipknot

from the album The End, So Far
- Released: November 5, 2021
- Genre: Nu metal
- Length: 4:49
- Label: Roadrunner
- Songwriters: Jim Root; Corey Taylor
- Producers: Slipknot; Joe Barresi

Slipknot singles chronology
"Nero Forte" (2019)	"The Chapeltown Rag" (2021)	"The Dying Song (Time to Sing)" (2022)

Music video
- "The Chapeltown Rag" on YouTube

"The Chapeltown Rag" is a song by American heavy metal band Slipknot. Produced by Joe Barresi, it was released on November 5, 2021, as the first single from the band's album The End, So Far.

== Background ==
In November 2021, the band purchased a new domain thechapeltownrag.com and started to publish several different snippets of a song to tease a new release. An official announcement was made on November 4, 2021, unveiling the newly titled song "The Chapeltown Rag" that would be released the following day on November 5, 2021. The release of the single would coincide with the penultimate Knotfest Roadshow show in Los Angeles, California, where the band would play "The Chapeltown Rag" live for the first time.

== Composition and lyrics ==
"The Chapeltown Rag" has been described by critics as a nu metal song. The song was written by frontman Corey Taylor and lead guitarist Jim Root, while they co-produced the song alongside Joe Barresi. The song is about the media's handling of the murder spree committed by Peter Sutcliffe, who was dubbed as "The Yorkshire Ripper." The title is a direct reference to Chapeltown in Leeds, England, one of the areas where Sutcliffe murdered at least 13 women. A "rag" in the UK is a derogatory term for a tabloid newspaper. A Twitter user who claimed to live in the area complained that the song made them feel deeply uncomfortable. Though the killings were merely used as a metaphor from Taylor's perspective as he would elaborate on the meaning of "The Chapeltown Rag":

"It's a punisher man. It's classic Slipknot. And it's frenetic. But lyrically, it's coming from a point of talking about the various manipulations that can happen when social media meets media itself. And the different ways that these manipulations can try to pull us in different directions, in the fact that we're all becoming addicts to it, which is very, very dangerous."

== Critical reception ==
"The Chapeltown Rag" generally received very positive reception by critics. Nicholas Gaudet of Music Talkers would break down "The Chapeltown Rag", mentioning how the song would hark back to Iowa and borrow ideas from black metal though went on to explain how this was a classic Slipknot sounding tune. "In typical Slipknot fashion, the song goes into a melodic, clean-sung chorus, all the while still bearing the aggressive vibe from the bridge. There’s an almost military-like bridge leading to the first breakdown. The first breakdown still follows the same tempo, only feeling a bit groovier. The song then slows to a fake-out ending, similar to something off their self-titled 1999 release, and interrupted by a single hi-hat leading to the slower, heavier outro. The feedback from almost every instrument brings the song to a slow close."

Speaking to Metal Hammer, Max Portnoy of Pennsylvanian nu metal band Tallah would label it as one of the best Slipknot songs in recent years. "The song structure feels chaotic and reminiscent of stuff they used to do back in the old days. Jay's drumming in particular was a highlight for me. It's got me really excited for what's to come with their next album."

Loudwire named "The Chapeltown Rag" as one of the best metal songs of 2021, ranking it in 17th place.

== Personnel ==
Credits retrieved from The End, So Far CD booklet.

- Corey Taylor – vocals
- Mick Thomson – guitars
- Sid Wilson – turntables
- Shawn "Clown" Crahan – percussion
- Alessandro Venturella – bass
- Jay Weinberg – drums
- Michael Pfaff – percussion
- James Root – guitars
- Craig Jones – samples, media

== Charts ==
Chart performance for "The Chapeltown Rag"
Chart (2021)	Peak position
Australia Digital Tracks (ARIA)	23
Canada Digital Songs (Billboard)	19
UK Singles Downloads (OCC)	28
UK Singles Sales (OCC)	33
UK Rock & Metal (OCC)	13
US Digital Song Sales (Billboard)	19
US Hot Rock & Alternative Songs (Billboard)	19
