= The Dying Song (Time to Sing) =

Single by Slipknot

from the album The End, So Far
- Released: July 19, 2022
- Recorded: 2021
- Genre: Nu metal; heavy metal
- Length: 3:23
- Label: Roadrunner
- Producers: Slipknot; Joe Barresi

Slipknot singles chronology
"The Chapeltown Rag" (2021)	"The Dying Song (Time to Sing)" (2022)	"Yen" (2022)

Music video
- "The Dying Song (Time To Sing)" on YouTube

"The Dying Song (Time to Sing)" is a song by American heavy metal band Slipknot. Produced by Joe Barresi, it was released on July 19, 2022, as the second single from the band's album The End, So Far.

== Background ==
On July 19, 2022, the band posted a cryptic teaser to the song's music video on social media. The music video and song were released the same day, alongside the reveal of the title of their seventh studio album, The End, So Far.

== Composition and lyrics ==
In an interview with Metal Hammer, lead singer Corey Taylor explained, "That song is really about the death of empathy and humanity, because of how technology has pulled us out of social circles and social niceties, social anything. It's the musical equivalent of bashing your head against a fucking wall."

== Reception ==
Music journalist Joe Daly of Louder Sound praised the song's "blistering [guitar] crunch" and "thundering levels of percussion", writing that it "is an exhilarating introduction to Slipknot’s latest chapter and convincing proof that not all things mellow with age." Dom Lawson of Blabbermouth praised "The Dying Song" and "The Chapeltown Rag" for their "skull-rattling heaviness and ululating waves of deathly riffing".

== Personnel ==
Credits retrieved from The End, So Far CD booklet.

- Corey Taylor – vocals
- Mick Thomson – guitars
- Sid Wilson – turntables
- Shawn "Clown" Crahan – percussion
- Alessandro Venturella – bass
- Jay Weinberg – drums
- Michael Pfaff – percussion
- James Root – guitars
- Craig Jones – samples, media

== Charts ==
Chart performance for "The Dying Song (Time to Sing)"
Chart (2022)	Peak position
Hungary (Single Top 40)	31
UK Singles Downloads (OCC)	70
UK Singles Sales (OCC)	71
UK Video Streaming (OCC)	98
UK Rock & Metal (OCC)	24
US Hot Rock & Alternative Songs (Billboard)	27
