= Yen (song) =

Single by Slipknot

from the album The End, So Far
- Released: August 5, 2022
- Recorded: 2021
- Genre: Heavy metal
- Length: 4:43
- Label: Roadrunner
- Producers: Slipknot; Joe Barresi

Slipknot singles chronology
"The Dying Song (Time to Sing)" (2022)	"Yen" (2022)	"Bone Church" (2023)

Music video
- "Yen" on YouTube

"Yen" is a song by an American heavy metal band Slipknot. It was released as the third single from the band's seventh studio album, The End, So Far on August 5, 2022.

== Background ==
In an interview with Kerrang! before the album's release, vocalist Corey Taylor said, "'Yen' is probably one of my favorite songs that we've ever done. And it's such a great, cool departure for us, because there are obviously very Slipknot elements to it, but then some of the music is us kind of touching our inner Tom Waits in weird ways."

== Music video ==
The song's music video was released on August 22, 2022. Directed by band member Shawn Crahan, it features the band performing in a large, spooky mansion with shots of unnerving, occult-like figures. The song also features an unmasked Corey Taylor as the central protagonist of the video. This is only the fourth time an unmasked Taylor has appeared in one of the band's music videos following "Before I Forget", "Dead Memories" and "Snuff."

== Personnel ==
Credits retrieved from The End, So Far CD booklet.

- Corey Taylor – vocals
- Mick Thomson – guitars
- Sid Wilson – turntables
- Shawn "Clown" Crahan – percussion
- Alessandro Venturella – bass
- Jay Weinberg – drums
- Michael Pfaff – percussion
- James Root – guitars
- Craig Jones – samples, media

== Charts ==
Chart performance for "Yen"
Chart (2022)	Peak position
Germany Rock Airplay (GfK)	21
UK Singles Downloads (OCC)	100
US Hot Rock & Alternative Songs (Billboard)	37
US Rock Airplay (Billboard)	46
