= Adderall (EP) =

EP by Slipknot
- Released: June 9, 2023
- Genre: Downtempo; alternative rock
- Length: 19:21
- Label: Roadrunner
- Producer: Slipknot; Joe Barresi

Slipknot chronology
The End, So Far (2022)	Adderall (2023)	Live at MSG (2023)

Adderall is a song by American heavy metal band Slipknot from their seventh studio album The End, So Far (2022), as well as being released as the band's first extended play (EP) on June 9, 2023, by Roadrunner Records. The EP features six variations on the song.

== Background ==
Slipknot first teased the release of Adderall on June 8, 2023, when they shared a short video on social media which linked to a website containing a video for the song "Death March", a slowed-down, reversed version of "Adderall". The next day, the EP was released on streaming platforms and a video for the rough mix of "Adderall" was also shared.

== Track listing ==
All tracks are written by Slipknot.

No.	Title	Length
1.	"Death March"	1:04
2.	"Adderall" (no intro)	4:36
3.	"Adderall" (rough demo)	3:43
4.	"Red or Redder"	0:25
5.	"Adderall" (instrumental)	5:43
6.	"Hard to Be Here"	3:48
Total length:		19:21

== Personnel ==
Credits retrieved from The End, So Far's liner notes.

Slipknot

- Corey Taylor – vocals
- Mick Thomson – guitars
- Sid Wilson – turntables
- Shawn "Clown" Crahan – percussion
- Alessandro Venturella – bass
- Jay Weinberg – drums
- Michael Pfaff – percussion
- James Root – guitars
- Craig Jones – samples, media

Choir

- Jennifer Prim
- Jahna Perricone
- Andrew Koch
- Carmen Sicherman
- Brian Wold
- Kat Green
- Gordon Glor
- Stacy Young
- John DeMartini
- Grainne Ward
- Lon Fiala
- Nicole Scates
- Carmel Simmons

Production

- Slipknot – production
- Joe Barresi – production, mixing, recording engineer
- Bob Ludwig – mastering
- Matt Tuggle – assistant engineer
- Kelsey Porter – assistant engineer
- Brian Rajaratnam – assistant engineer
- Jun Murakawa – assistant engineer
- Jerry Johnson – drum technician
- Billy Bowers – drum editing

== Charts ==
Chart performance for "Adderall"
Chart (2022)	Peak position
New Zealand Hot Singles (RMNZ)	31
UK Rock & Metal (OCC)	35
