= The End, So Far =

Studio album by Slipknot
- Released: September 30, 2022
- Recorded: Early 2021 – February 2022
- Studios: Henson (Hollywood, California); JHOC (Pasadena, California); Hideout (Henderson, Nevada)
- Genres: Nu metal; alternative metal; groove metal
- Length: 57:31
- Label: Roadrunner
- Producers: Slipknot; Joe Barresi

Slipknot chronology
We Are Not Your Kind (2019)	The End, So Far (2022)	Adderall (2023)

Singles from The End, So Far
- 1. "The Chapeltown Rag" Released: November 5, 2021; 2. "The Dying Song (Time to Sing)" Released: July 19, 2022; 3. "Yen" Released: August 5, 2022

The End, So Far is the seventh studio album by American heavy metal band Slipknot. It was released on September 30, 2022, through Roadrunner Records. This is the band's first studio album to feature percussionist Michael Pfaff, who joined the band in 2019 and their final album to be released through Roadrunner, whom the band signed with in 1998. It is also their final studio album to feature sampler and keyboardist Craig Jones, drummer Jay Weinberg and DJ Sid Wilson before their respective departures in June and November 2023 and August 2026.

At a length of 57 minutes and 31 seconds, The End, So Far is the band's shortest studio album to date.

== Background ==
On May 19, 2021, percussionist Shawn Crahan stated that the band had been currently making "god music". In an article published by Loudwire on June 9, 2021, Crahan revealed that a new Slipknot album would 'hopefully' be released in 2021. He also added that the band would be parting ways with Roadrunner Records following the release of the album.

In November 2021, the band started teasing new material on a new domain thechapeltownrag.com. Several snippets of a song were shown on the website leading to speculation of a new single that the band would later confirm on November 4, with the single titled "The Chapeltown Rag" slated for release the following day alongside its live debut at the Knotfest Roadshow in Los Angeles on November 5, 2021. In December 2021, Taylor revealed that the band were planning on mixing their seventh studio album in January, and hoped to release it by April 2022. He also stated that he preferred the material on their forthcoming seventh studio album to that on We Are Not Your Kind.

In February 2022, lead singer Corey Taylor announced in an interview with Eddie Trunk that the recording of the album had finished, and that it was in the process of being mixed. He described the record as a "heavier version" of their 2004 album Vol. 3: The Subliminal Verses.

On July 19, 2022, the band announced the album along with the album's second single "The Dying Song (Time to Sing)". On August 5, 2022, the band released the third single, "Yen". The full album was released on September 30, 2022.

On August 22, 2022, the band announced that there would be nine special editions of the album to be released, each featuring a picture of one of the band members on the cover.

The album is dedicated to former drummer Joey Jordison, who died in his sleep in July 2021. The original vinyl and cassette releases of The End, So Far were misprinted as The End For Now.... In a Reddit AMA, Corey Taylor said that The End, So Far was always the album's intended title, and that the misprint had been caused by "somebody [who] fucked up and didn't double check" with the band.

== Critical reception ==
Professional ratings
Aggregate scores
Source	Rating
AnyDecentMusic?	6.7/10
Metacritic	80/100
Review scores
Source	Rating
AllMusic	3.5/5 stars
Blabbermouth.net	8.5/10
Clash	8/10
The Daily Telegraph	4/5 stars
Exclaim!	7/10
Kerrang!	4/5 stars
The Line of Best Fit	8/10
Metal Hammer	4/5 stars
NME	4/5 stars
Sputnikmusic	2.3/5

According to the review aggregator Metacritic, The End, So Far received "generally favorable reviews" based on a weighted average score of 80 out of 100 from 10 critic scores.

Luke Morton of Kerrang! commented that The End, So Far was more of an album "rather than a selection of songs". He welcomed the new direction the band had taken with tracks such as the opening track "Adderall", a "six-minute, synth-driven track - with all clean singing", while still noting that the album retained Slipknot's trademarked heaviness, with "primal screams, blastbeats, and more scratching wizardry from Sid Wilson than we've heard in a long time".

Andrew Trendell of NME gave the album four stars out of five, comparing the band's new direction to David Bowie, Tool and Stone Temple Pilots, while also noting that heavier tracks like "Hivemind" and "Heirloom" would provide comfort for "Slipknot fans of old".

Blabbermouth.net, too, noted the band's new musical style, highlighting that, while singles such as "The Dying Song" and "The Chapeltown Rag" provided "skull-rattling heaviness and ululating waves of deathly riffing," tracks such as "Adderall" and "Medicine for the Dead" showed the band's, and in particular vocalist Taylor's, versatility and evolution.

Cervante Popé of Consequence Of Sound stated "As a new release, it's got more than enough exploratory factors to keep the band from sounding stale, but it also stays true to the sounds that have turned us all into maggots in the first place."

Reviewing the album for AllMusic, James Christopher Monger was also divided about it; "The End, So Far may not be a home run, but it proves that the band are still in it to win it, even if they're playing the long game."

=== Accolades ===
Year-end accolades for The End, So Far
Publication	Accolade	Rank	Ref.
Loudwire	The 50 Best Rock + Metal Albums of 2022	–	
Metal Hammer	The 50 Best Albums of 2022	16	
Revolver	25 Best Albums of 2022	16	

== Commercial performance ==
The End, So Far debuted within the top ten in over ten countries worldwide, including peaks at the summit in several countries including Australia, Germany, Greece, Mexico, Switzerland and the United Kingdom. In the United States, the album debuted at number 2 on the Billboard 200, the first album of theirs not to debut at the summit since 2004's Vol. 3: (The Subliminal Verses) while selling 59,000 copies in the first week with 50,500 coming from pure sales. In the UK, the album outsold the reissue of George Michael's Older by 340 units after trailing to it in the midweek chart update, claiming the band its third number-one on the UK Albums Chart following 2001's Iowa and 2019's predecessor We Are Not Your Kind. It sold a total of 14,068 copies, 12,083 of which came from pure sales while also collecting an additional 2,005 album-equivalent units from streaming.

== Track listing ==
All songwriters are adapted from the ASCAP Songview database.

The End, So Far track listing
No.	Title	Writer(s)	Length
1.	"Adderall"	Corey Taylor, James Root, Alessandro Venturella, Shawn Crahan, Michael Pfaff, Sid Wilson	5:40
2.	"The Dying Song (Time to Sing)"	Taylor, Root, Venturella, Crahan, Pfaff	3:23
3.	"The Chapeltown Rag"	Taylor, Root, Venturella, Crahan	4:49
4.	"Yen"	Taylor, Root, Venturella, Crahan, Pfaff, Wilson	4:43
5.	"Hive Mind"	Taylor, Root, Venturella, Crahan, Mick Thomson	5:15
6.	"Warranty"	Taylor, Root, Venturella, Crahan, Pfaff	3:51
7.	"Medicine for the Dead"	Taylor, Root, Venturella, Crahan, Thomson	6:16
8.	"Acidic"	Taylor, Root, Venturella, Crahan, Thomson, Pfaff	4:50
9.	"Heirloom"	Taylor, Root, Venturella, Crahan, Thomson	3:31
10.	"H377"	Taylor, Root, Venturella, Crahan, Thomson	4:23
11.	"De Sade"	Taylor, Root, Venturella, Crahan, Thomson, Wilson	5:39
12.	"Finale"	Taylor, Root, Venturella, Crahan, Pfaff	5:07
Total length:			57:31

Vinyl release - side one
No.	Title	Length
1.	"Adderall"	5:40
2.	"The Dying Song (Time to Sing)"	3:23
3.	"The Chapeltown Rag"	4:49
Total length:		13:52

Vinyl release - side two
No.	Title	Length
1.	"Yen"	4:43
2.	"Hive Mind"	5:15
3.	"Warranty"	3:51
Total length:		13:49

Vinyl release - side three
No.	Title	Length
1.	"Medicine for the Dead"	6:16
2.	"Acidic"	4:50
3.	"Heirloom"	3:31
Total length:		14:37

Vinyl release - side four
No.	Title	Length
1.	"H377"	4:23
2.	"De Sade"	5:39
3.	"Finale"	5:07
Total length:		15:09

== Personnel ==
Credits retrieved from album's liner notes.

Slipknot
- Corey Taylor – vocals
- Mick Thomson – guitars
- Sid Wilson – turntables
- Shawn "Clown" Crahan – percussion
- Alessandro Venturella – bass
- Jay Weinberg – drums
- Michael Pfaff – percussion
- James Root – guitars
- Craig Jones – samples, media

Choir on "Adderall", "Warranty", and "Finale"

- Jennifer Prim
- Jahna Perricone
- Andrew Koch
- Carmen Sicherman
- Brian Wold
- Kat Green
- Gordon Glor
- Stacy Young
- John DeMartini
- Grainne Ward
- Lon Fiala
- Nicole Scates
- Carmel Simmons

Production

- Slipknot – production
- Joe Barresi – production, recording, mixing
- Alex Linares – additional recording on "H377"
- Tristan Hardin – additional recording on "H377"
- Greg Gordon – additional recording on "H377"
- Matt Tuggle – assistant engineer
- Kelsey Porter – assistant engineer
- Brian Rajaratnam – assistant engineer
- Jun Murakawa – assistant engineer
- Jerry Johnson – drum technician
- Billy Bowers – drum editing
- Bob Ludwig – mastering
- Virgilio Tzaj – design
- Shawn Crahan – art direction, photography
- Anthony Scanga – additional photography

== Charts ==
=== Weekly charts ===
Weekly chart performance for The End, So Far
Chart (2022)	Peak position
Australian Albums (ARIA)	1
Austrian Albums (Ö3 Austria)	4
Belgian Albums (Ultratop Flanders)	4
Belgian Albums (Ultratop Wallonia)	3
Canadian Albums (Billboard)	2
Croatian International Albums (HDU)	1
Danish Albums (Hitlisten)	12
Dutch Albums (Album Top 100)	6
Finnish Albums (Suomen virallinen lista)	2
French Albums (SNEP)	5
German Albums (Offizielle Top 100)	1
Greek Albums (IFPI)	1
Hungarian Albums (MAHASZ)	3
Irish Albums (Official Charts)	7
Italian Albums (FIMI)	20
Japanese Albums (Oricon)	11
Japanese Combined Albums (Oricon)	12
Japanese Hot Albums (Billboard Japan)	9
Lithuanian Albums (AGATA)	79
New Zealand Albums (RMNZ)	2
Polish Albums (ZPAV)	6
Portuguese Albums (AFP)	2
Scottish Albums (Official Charts)	3
Spanish Albums (Promusicae)	15
Swedish Albums (Sverigetopplistan)	2
Swedish Hard Rock Albums (Sverigetopplistan)	1
Swiss Albums (Schweizer Hitparade)	1
Swiss Albums (Romandie)	1
UK Albums (Official Charts)	1
UK Rock & Metal Albums (Official Charts)	1
US Billboard 200	2
US Top Alternative Albums (Billboard)	1
US Top Hard Rock Albums (Billboard)	1
US Top Rock Albums (Billboard)	1

=== Year-end charts ===
Year-end chart performance for The End, So Far
Chart (2022)	Position
German Albums (Offizielle Top 100)	80
US Top Album Sales (Billboard)	86
US Top Current Album Sales (Billboard)	63
US Top Hard Rock Albums (Billboard)	25
