= Mate. Feed. Kill. Repeat. =

Studio album by Slipknot
- Released: October 31, 1996
- Recorded: December 1995 – March 1996
- Studio: SR Audio (Des Moines, Iowa)
- Genres: Nu metal; death metal
- Length: 51:03
- Label: -ismist
- Producers: Slipknot; Sean McMahon

Slipknot chronology
Mate. Feed. Kill. Repeat. (1996)	Slipknot (1999)

Mate. Feed. Kill. Repeat. is the independent debut album recorded by the American heavy metal band Slipknot, and their only release with original lead vocalist Anders Colsefni. The album was limited to 1,000 copies, with distribution beginning on October 31, 1996. The band sold the last 386 units through ‑ismist Recordings in 1997. The album has become sought after by fans since Slipknot's rise to fame, and original copies have sold for up to at least $1,200.

The majority of the album's songs were included on the band's subsequent releases, albeit usually in radically altered forms. The record was recorded in Des Moines, Iowa over a period of four months and features many musical influences including funk, jazz, and disco which are not apparent in later material. Many of the lyrics and the album's title are inspired by the role-playing game Werewolf: The Apocalypse. According to AllMusic, the songs contain a stronger "emphasis on non-traditional songwriting" and melodic themes than the band's later material.

== Recording and production ==
In late 1995, Slipknot and producer Sean McMahon entered SR Audio, a studio in the band's hometown of Des Moines, Iowa to work on what they intended to be their debut album. Retrospectively, McMahon said that the band was "driven" because they spent the majority of their time in the studio for the four months it took to produce the album. Slipknot self-financed the production, which came to an estimated $40,000. The band expressed how much of a learning process this time was, being the first time they had recorded their music, specifically the challenge of capturing additional percussion elements.

The band aimed for a tribal sound, but encountered problems including minuscule timing errors. However, during this period, Slipknot refined their percussive sound by experimenting with erecting walls to isolate the drums and rearranging parts. In February 1996, during the mixing process, guitarist Donnie Steele decided to leave the band for religious reasons and as a result, Craig Jones joined the band to fill the spot. However, the band realized that they were incorporating too many media samples on their recordings and could not replicate these sounds live. To solve this problem, Jones abandoned his position on guitar and moved to the position of sampler, and Mick Thomson stepped in to join as guitarist. Originally, the band had planned to include twelve tracks on the CD, two of which – "Fur" (also known as "Fur Covered In Blood") and "Part of Me" – already appeared on their first demo in 1995. In the end, Mate. Feed. Kill. Repeat. was released with only eight tracks. The band threw a release party at The Safari, a club in Des Moines where the band played many of their earliest gigs.

== Musical and lyrical themes ==
Mate. Feed. Kill. Repeat. features a mix of genres centered on nu metal and death metal. The album is the band's most experimental and differs from the heavier style for which they became known. One of the band's initial aims was to mix many genres to achieve their own style; an early incarnation of the band was called "Meld" based upon this. Tracks such as "Slipknot", "Some Feel" and "Only One" are mostly straightforward heavy metal, while the tracks "Tattered & Torn", "Killers Are Quiet" and "Gently" include the slow, cerebral angst buildup style that the band retained in some of their more recent work. Mate. Feed. Kill. Repeat is influenced by slam death metal and grindcore but also by non-metal genres such as jazz and funk, although "Confessions" is the only track led by these styles. The album's most complex song, "Do Nothing/Bitchslap", uses grindcore as a base for genre experimentation, featuring jazz, funk and even disco elements.

The album title and the majority of the lyrics are references to the role-playing game Werewolf: The Apocalypse. Vocalist Anders Colsefni and percussionist Shawn Crahan shared a mutual interest in the game, which largely influenced the band. Colsefni said: "The attraction was being able to play a different person", declaring that this was the essence of Slipknot.

== Legacy ==
Professional ratings
Review scores
Source	Rating
AllMusic	2.5/5 stars

The original pressing of the album was limited to 1000 copies. Since the band's rise to fame in 1999, it has been a sought-after rarity for Slipknot fans. Upon its initial release, the band distributed the album independently, handing them out to fans, radio stations, and record labels. On June 13, 1997, ‑ismist Recordings took over the distribution of the remaining 386 copies of the album. This original pressing has since grown in value considerably. Due to the large amount of interest in the album and the low numbers of originals, there have been many bootlegged versions of the album sold including CD, MP3 and even vinyl.

Although the songs on Mate. Feed. Kill. Repeat. did not appear on any other official album, most of the songs were later re-recorded or heavily altered for their subsequent studio albums. "Slipknot" was used as the basis for "(sic)" on Slipknot, "Only One" was re-recorded under the same name on Slipknot, "Tattered & Torn" was re-recorded under the same name on Slipknot, "Gently" was re-recorded under the same name on Iowa, and "Killers Are Quiet" was used as the basis for "Iowa" on Iowa. The barcode of the original CD is the number "742617000027", which was used as the name for the opening track on Slipknot.

As part of the Nu Metal Mayhem tour with Waylon Reavis, which took place in Australia and New Zealand in October 2023, Anders Colsefni performed the album in its entirety.

A re-recorded version of the album by New Zealand band Kaosis with Anders Colsefni was released on March 15, 2024. However, Colsefni quickly disowned the release, stating that he had not signed off on the final mix, nor any of the release details.

== Track listing ==
All lyrics are written by Anders Colsefni and Shawn Crahan; all music is composed by Slipknot.

No.	Title	Length
1.	"Slipknot"	6:55
2.	"Gently"	5:16
3.	"Do Nothing/Bitchslap"	4:20
4.	"Only One"	2:33
5.	"Tattered & Torn"	2:35
6.	"Confessions"	5:05
7.	"Some Feel"	3:36
8.	"Killers Are Quiet" (includes hidden track "Dogfish" (Note: The song "Killers Are Quiet" ends at 10:25. The hidden track "Dogfish Rising" starts at 15:35 after 5 minutes and 10 seconds of industrial sounds.))	20:42
Total length:		51:01

== Personnel ==
All credits adapted from the official CD liner notes.

Slipknot

- Shawn "Kong" Crahan – percussion, vocals, lyrics
- Anders Colsefni – lead vocals, tribal percussion, lyrics
- Nathan Jordison – drums, lyrics, photography
- Paul Gray – bass, vocals
- Josh "Gnar" Brainard – guitars, vocals, auxiliary percussion
- Craig "133 MHz" Jones – sampling
- Mick Thomson – lead guitar (Note: During the late stages of the album's recording sessions, guitarist Donnie Steele left the band. Initially, Craig Jones joined as his replacement, but he switched roles as the samplist/keyboardist; thus, Mick Thomson was brought in as guitarist. In the album's liner notes, Thomson is credited as a band member while Steele is mentioned as the guitarist who played on the album.)
- Donnie Steele – lead guitar (tracks 1, 6, 9), rhythm guitar (tracks 2–5, 7, 8)

Additional personnel

- Sean McMahon – vocals (track 9), production, mixing, mastering, recording, engineering
- Slipknot – production, mixing
- Mike Lawyer – mastering, studio owner
- Frank Plumly – vocals (track 9)
- Stefan Seskis – photography
