= Anders Colsefni =

American singer (born 1972)

- Born: Andrew Richard Rouw; April 15, 1972 (age 54)
- Origin: Des Moines, Iowa, U.S.
- Genres: Heavy metal; death metal
- Occupation: Singer
- Years active: 1988–2003; 2005–2015; 2020–present
- Member of: Painface
- Formerly of: Vexx; Inveigh Catharsis; Body Pit; Vice Grip Throttle; On a Pale Horse; All That Crawls; Slum-Lord; Slipknot

Andrew Richard Rouw, known professionally as Anders Colsefni (born April 15, 1972), is an American musician, best known as the original singer and a founding member of heavy metal band Slipknot. He only appeared on Slipknot's 1996 demo album Mate. Feed. Kill. Repeat., performing vocal and additional percussion duties.

== Career ==
Before forming Slipknot with Shawn Crahan and Paul Gray in 1995, Colsefni drummed and occasionally sang in a number of local bands, often crossing paths with other future Slipknot members. His first band was the death metal band Vexx, which was formed in 1988 and saw Colsefni joined by Gray on bass and Josh Brainard on guitar and vocals. In 1992, Vexx renamed to Inveigh Catharsis and occasionally played with drummer Joey Jordison. They broke up in 1993, when Brainard left to join Jordison and guitarist Craig Jones in Modifidious, another local metal band. By March 1993, Colsefni and Gray were jamming with drummer Crahan and guitarist Patrick Neuwirth. Around this time, he also performed vocal duties in Body Pit, one of Gray's bands that also had future Slipknot guitarists Mick Thomson and Donnie Steele as members at one point. In September 1995, Colsefni, Crahan and Gray formed the band that would later be known as Slipknot. The Pale Ones, as they were called at first, were joined by guitarists Steele and Brainard, as well as Jordison on drums. Colsefni provided lead vocals and shared percussion duties with Crahan, while Gray took on bass. The band changed their name to Meld, taken from a Body Pit song, for their first show.

In late 1995, Jordison suggested the band change their name to Slipknot, after a song recorded by Colsefni, Crahan and Neuwirth during their jam sessions in 1993. Steele left while recording their first demo album Mate. Feed. Kill. Repeat. in early 1996, and was replaced by Craig Jones and then by Mick Thomson, with Jones moving on to samples. The album was released on October 31, 1996, but received little radio airplay. This led the band to seek a more melodic style of vocals, something that Colsefni could not deliver. The band recruited Corey Taylor, vocalist of Stone Sour, which moved Colsefni to backing vocals.

However, this formation would only play two shows in August and September 1997, before Colsefni announced on stage that he would be leaving Slipknot. His replacement on percussion was Greg Welts and later Chris Fehn. Colsefni founded a new band, Painface, in 1998, they released one full-length album, Fleshcraft, in 1999 and the On a Pale Horse EP in 2000. The band changed their name to On a Pale Horse in 2001; Colsefni left the band in 2003. Despite leaving Slipknot in 1997, Colsefni stayed in contact with some of its members and even provided vocals for the Stone Sour demo track "Dead Weight", along with Crahan and others. In later years, he affirmed that there was no animosity between him and his former band, and stated that it was actually Taylor who he was closest to.

Colsefni reformed Painface in 2010 with a new lineup, releasing the Skullcrusher EP in 2013, but stopped performing in 2015. In October 2023, Colsefni joined Waylon Reavis on the Nu Metal Mayhem tour, which took place in Australia and New Zealand and saw Colsefni perform Mate. Feed. Kill. Repeat. in its entirety for the first time since 1997. He dedicated his tour to Gray and Jordison, who had died in 2010 and 2021, respectively.

On March 15, 2024, a re-recorded version of Mate. Feed. Kill. Repeat. was released by New Zealand band Kaosis with Colsefni on vocals. However, during the day of release, Colsefni stated that the album was released without his consent and that the released record material is an unfinished product.
