= Slipknot (band) =

American heavy metal band

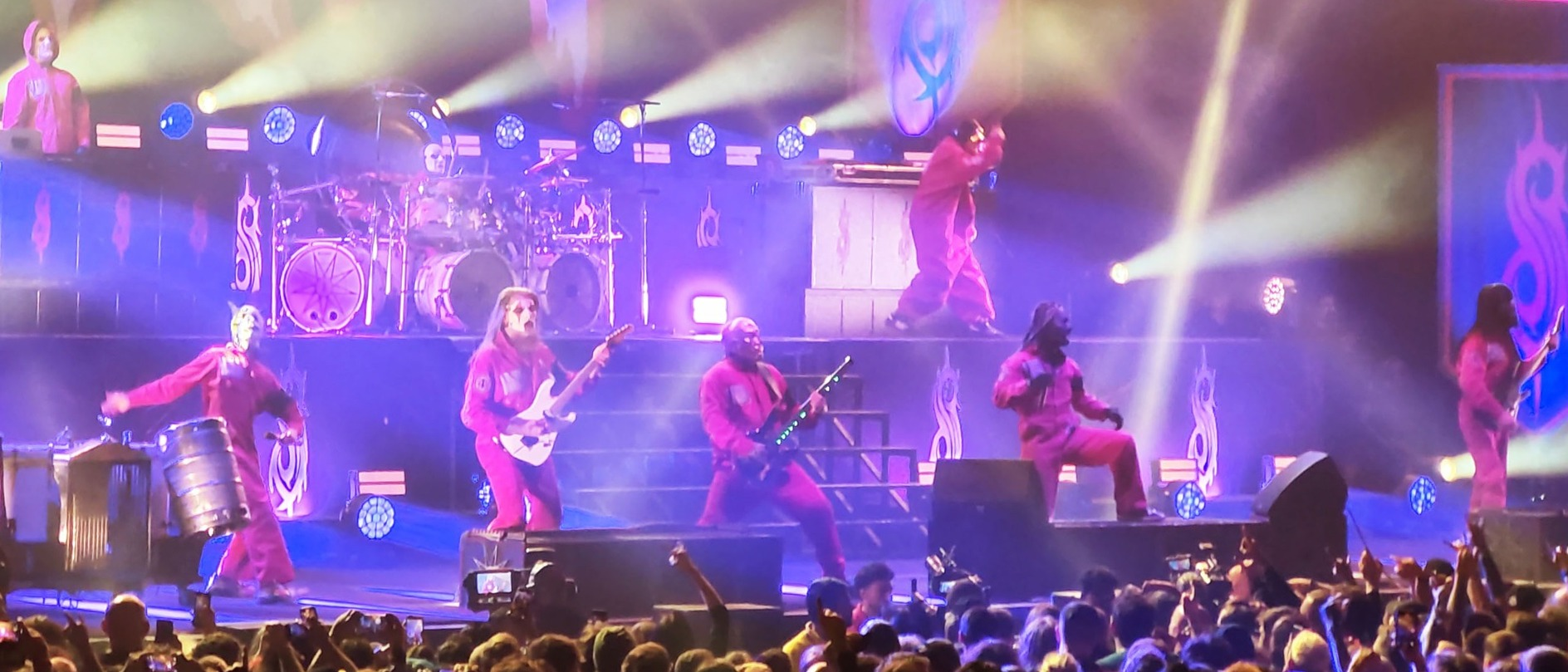
- Slipknot performing at the O2 Arena in December 2024

Background information
- Also known as: Meld (1995)
- Origin: Des Moines, Iowa, U.S.
- Genres: Nu metal; alternative metal; groove metal
- Works: Discography; songs; tours
- Years active: 1995–present
- Labels: Roadrunner; Atlantic; (Sic)est
- Spinoffs: To My Surprise; Dirty Little Rabbits; Look Outside Your Window
- Members: Shawn Crahan; Mick Thomson; Corey Taylor; Jim Root; Alessandro Venturella; Michael Pfaff; Eloy Casagrande
- Past members: Paul Gray; Anders Colsefni; Donnie Steele; Joey Jordison; Josh Brainard; Craig Jones; Greg Welts; Sid Wilson; Chris Fehn; Jay Weinberg
- Website: slipknot1.com

Slipknot (/ˈslɪpnɒt/ SLIP-not) is an American heavy metal band formed in Des Moines, Iowa, in 1995 by percussionist Shawn Crahan, vocalist Anders Colsefni and bassist Paul Gray. After several lineup changes in its early years, the band settled on nine members from 1999 until Gray's death in 2010: Crahan, Gray, Joey Jordison, Craig Jones, Mick Thomson, Corey Taylor, Sid Wilson, Chris Fehn, and Jim Root. Slipknot is well known for its attention-grabbing image, aggressive style of music, and energetic and chaotic live shows.

The band's debut demo album, Mate. Feed. Kill. Repeat. was unsuccessful, but they rapidly rose to fame following the release of their self-titled debut studio album in 1999. The 2001 follow-up studio album, Iowa, although darker and more brutal in tone, made the band more popular. After a brief hiatus, Slipknot returned in 2004 with Vol. 3: (The Subliminal Verses), before going on another hiatus and returning in 2008 with its fourth studio album, All Hope Is Gone, which debuted at number one on the US Billboard 200 chart. After another long hiatus, Slipknot released its fifth studio album, .5: The Gray Chapter, in 2014. Their sixth studio album, We Are Not Your Kind, was released on August 9, 2019. Their seventh studio album, The End, So Far, was released on September 30, 2022. The band has released two live albums titled 9.0: Live and Day of the Gusano: Live in Mexico, a compilation album titled Antennas to Hell, and five live DVDs. The band has sold 30 million records worldwide and over 12 million in their home country.

Bassist Gray died on May 24, 2010, and was replaced during 2011–2014 by Donnie Steele. After the death of Gray, the only founding member in the current lineup is percussionist Crahan. Jordison was dismissed from the band on December 12, 2013. Steele left during the recording sessions for .5: The Gray Chapter. The band found replacements in Alessandro Venturella on bass and Jay Weinberg on drums. Fehn was also dismissed from the band in March 2019 prior to the writing of We Are Not Your Kind and was replaced by Michael Pfaff. The band parted ways with Jones and Weinberg in 2023, with the latter being replaced by Eloy Casagrande the following year. DJ Sid Wilson was dismissed from the band in August 2026 after being with the band since 1998.

== History ==
=== Background (1991–1995) ===
In the years before Slipknot formed, a state of shifting band membership existed throughout the heavy metal scene in Des Moines, Iowa. In 1991, the biggest heavy metal band in Des Moines was Atomic Opera, with Jim Root on guitar. Drummer Joey Jordison founded a thrash metal band called Modifidious, playing at a club called Runway. Modifidious opened for Atomic Opera on December 1, 1991, at the Runway, after which their guitarist left for the more successful Atomic Opera. Jordison replaced him with local guitarist Craig Jones. Drummer Shawn Crahan formed another Des Moines band called Heads on the Wall, playing funk metal cover songs at clubs and releasing a demo tape in July 1992. A fourth Des Moines band called Vexx played death metal with Anders Colsefni on drums, Paul Gray on bass, and Josh Brainard on guitar and vocals. Colsefni later took over vocal duties, but Vexx never recorded. During this time, Crahan often went to the Runway on Sundays when the club opened to all ages, where he met other young musicians with whom he could jam. By March 1993, Crahan was jamming with vocalist Colsefni, bassist Gray and guitarist Patrick Neuwirth, writing and playing songs in Gray's basement, discussing possible band names, but never making a final decision. One of the songs they recorded was titled "Slipknot". The word on the second recording's spine was "Painface", which Colsefni later used to name his band Painface.

In 1993, a new band called Inveigh Catharsis formed in Des Moines, with Gray on bass, Brainard on guitar and Colsefni on drums. Jordison jammed occasionally with this group. Brainard eventually left to join Jordison and Jones in Modifidious, participating in demo recordings at the end of '93 and early in '94. During 1994, Modifidious sometimes played the same shows as Crahan's Heads on the Wall band. Gray formed a death metal band called Body Pit, soon becoming popular in the local scene. Modifidious stopped playing in the wake of death metal's increasing pull. Gray failed to get Jordison to join Body Pit, but soon after he recruited local guitar teacher Mick Thomson, the band broke up.

In September 1995, Colsefni, Crahan and Gray started a band named the Pale Ones. As guitarists, the band decided to invite local musician Donnie Steele. Not long after their inception, Gray invited Jordison to a rehearsal because the band was interested in experimenting with additional drum elements. Jordison subsequently joined the band as their drummer with Crahan moving to percussion. Furthermore, Colsefni also took up percussion while remaining the band's vocalist. Soon after Jordison joined, he invited Brainard to join the band, bringing their lineup to six members. The band made their public debut on November 5 at a benefit show in Des Moines, using the name Meld.

=== Mate. Feed. Kill. Repeat. and beginnings (1995–1998) ===
Much of the band's early development was retrospectively attributed to late-night planning sessions between Gray, Crahan and Jordison at a Sinclair gas station where Jordison worked nights. It was there, in late 1995, that Jordison suggested changing the band name to Slipknot after their song of the same name. In December, Slipknot began recording material at SR Audio, a studio in the band's hometown. As they did not have a recording contract, the band self-financed the project, the costs of which came to an estimated $40,000. In February 1996, guitarist Donnie Steele, a Christian, left Slipknot after discussions regarding the band's lyrics with the producer, Sean McMahon. Jordison said of Steele's departure: "(he) was having these God talks, when we were supposed to be working... We were prepared to keep him on, but he didn't want to stay." Steele himself has said: "I left for a few reasons...I had a lot on my mind spiritually." During the mixing stages of their project at SR Audio, Craig Jones was recruited as Steele's replacement on guitar. However, throughout their time in the studio, the band were adding samples to their recordings but could not produce these sounds live. Subsequently, Jones became the band's sampler and Mick Thomson was brought in as the replacement guitarist. After a complicated time with mixing and mastering, the band self-released Mate. Feed. Kill. Repeat. on Halloween, October 31, 1996.

Distribution for the demo was initially left to the band and their producer Sean McMahon, before it was handed over to the distribution company -ismist Recordings in early 1997. Slipknot received a small amount of airplay on local radio stations off the back of the demo. However, it did not lead to any kind of interest from record labels, so the band returned to the studio to develop new material. It was at this time that the band sought more melodic vocals for their music. As a result, Corey Taylor was recruited from fellow Des Moines band Stone Sour; this moved Colsefni to backing vocals and percussion. While working in the studio, Slipknot continued to do local shows, during one of which in September 1997, Colsefni announced on stage that he was leaving the band. The gap on percussion was filled by Greg Welts, who was affectionately known as "Cuddles". In early 1998, Slipknot produced a second demo featuring five tracks exclusively for record labels. The band began to receive much attention from record labels, and in February 1998, producer Ross Robinson offered to produce their debut album after attending rehearsals in Des Moines. Soon after, DJ Sid Wilson was recruited as the band's ninth member after showing great interest and impressing band members. In late June, Slipknot received a $500,000, seven-album deal, from Roadrunner Records; the band signed the deal publicly on July 8, 1998. Two days prior to this, Welts was fired from the band, something which Slipknot refuse to comment on. Welts was replaced by Brandon Darner, who departed from the band shortly after joining.

=== Slipknot and rise to fame (1998–2000) ===
"(sic)" (1999)
16 second sample from Slipknot's "(sic)". Their debut album was much faster than their demo album Mate. Feed. Kill. Repeat. and, with nine members, their sound had changed drastically.

Chris Fehn was brought in to replace Darner on percussion before Slipknot traveled to Malibu, California, to work on their debut album in September 1998. Partway through the recording process of the album, Slipknot returned to Des Moines for the Christmas period. During that period, guitarist Brainard decided to leave the band. Brainard said, "some decisions were made that I wasn't particularly happy with". Slipknot later recruited Jim Root to complete their lineup and the band returned to Malibu to continue work on the album. Work on the album concluded in early 1999, allowing the band to go on their first tour as part of the Ozzfest lineup in 1999. Ozzfest greatly increased Slipknot's audience, furthering the band's success with their self-titled album that was released on June 29, 1999. Slipknot released its first home video Welcome to Our Neighborhood, which was directed by Thomas Mignone, and the singles "Wait and Bleed" and "Spit It Out", which were also directed by Mignone. The singles received some airplay, but Slipknot quickly developed a large following, mainly from touring and word of mouth. The band toured several countries throughout 1999 and 2000 in support of the album. In early 2000, Slipknot was certified platinum; a first for an album released by Roadrunner Records.

=== Iowa (2001–2003) ===
Anticipation for Slipknot's second album was intense. In early 2001, the band began recording the second album at Sound City and Sound Image studios in Los Angeles. Around this time, conflicts arose between band members due to extensive touring and recording schedules. Recording of their second album ended in February 2001 and the band embarked on their Iowa World Tour. Entitled Iowa, Slipknot's second album—released on August 28, 2001—peaked at number three on the Billboard charts and at number one in the UK. The album produced three singles; "The Heretic Anthem" (promotional single), "Left Behind" and "My Plague", which appeared on the soundtrack for the film Resident Evil. In 2002, Slipknot appeared in Rollerball (2002), performing "I Am Hated". The release and intense promotion of the album resulted in sold-out shows in large arenas in several countries.

In mid-2002, Slipknot went on hiatus because of internal conflicts, and band members focused on side projects. Vocalist Taylor and guitarist Root revived their band Stone Sour, drummer Jordison created Murderdolls with vocalist Wednesday 13, percussionist Crahan founded To My Surprise and DJ Wilson went solo as DJ Starscream. Both Taylor and Jordison appeared on MTV unmasked for the first time in public promoting their respective bands. For a while, the future of Slipknot was uncertain and there was much speculation about whether there would be a third album, or if the split would become permanent. An official update appeared on their official website on January 24, 2003, denying those claims. "I don't have a problem with anyone in Slipknot," Jordison protested. "I've seen comments from Corey saying there are things to be resolved, but I have no fucking idea what he's talking about."

Nonetheless, on November 22, 2002, Slipknot released their second DVD, Disasterpieces.

=== Vol. 3: (The Subliminal Verses) (2003–2007) ===
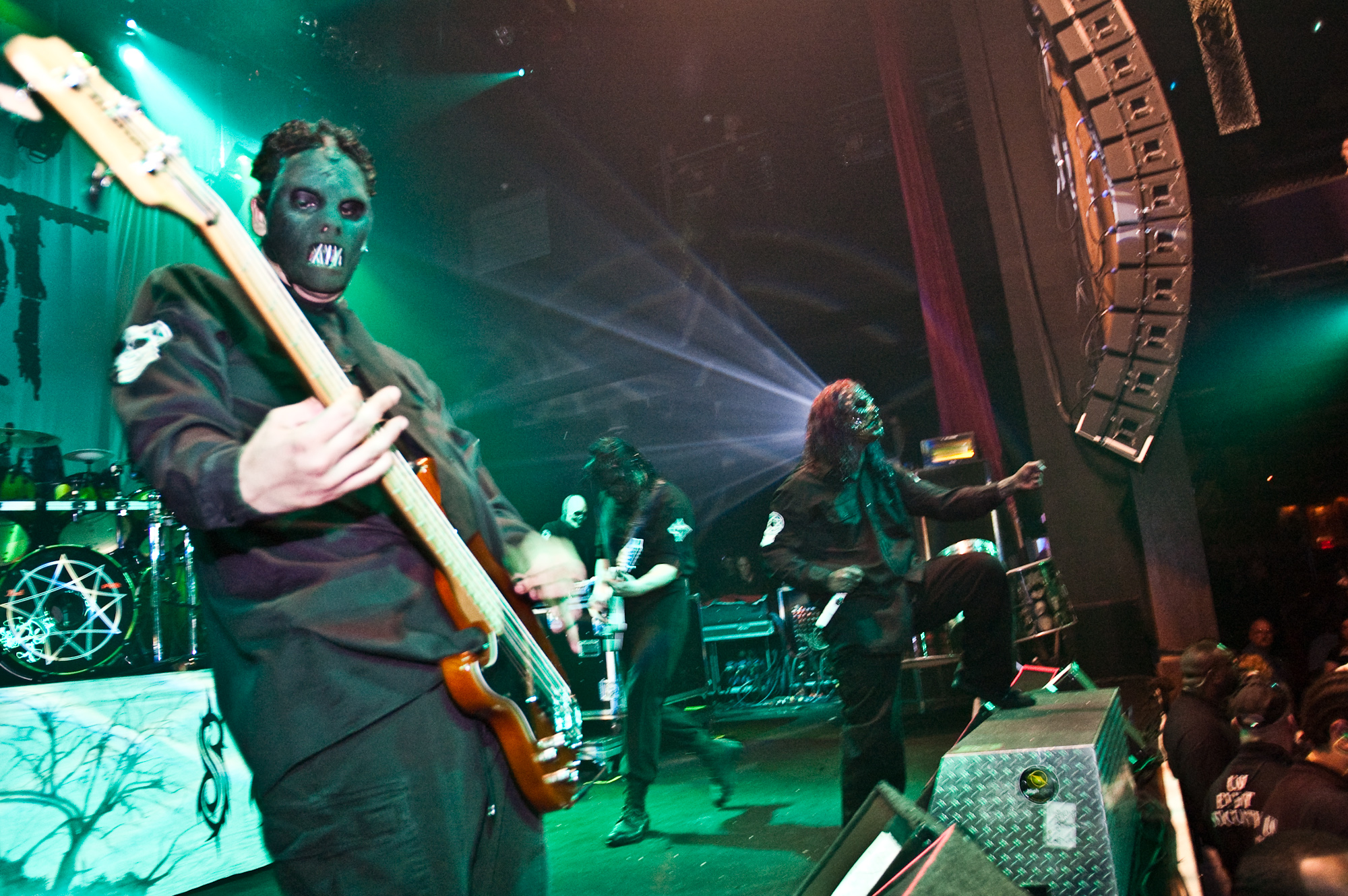
Slipknot performing in 2005

It was the rebirth of Slipknot, [...] it was like us coming back together, pushing out the vibe that had gotten in there and kinda started pulling people away. But we figured out that you know, we do have to get space you know, we do need to let people be sometimes.

— Bassist Paul Gray, on Slipknot's third album

After several delays, Slipknot moved into The Mansion in Los Angeles, California, in mid-2003 to work on their third album alongside producer Rick Rubin. By early 2004, work on the album had finished and the band began The Subliminal Verses World Tour with their appearance on the Jägermeister Music Tour in March 2004. Vol. 3: (The Subliminal Verses) was released on May 24, 2004; it peaked at number two on the Billboard album charts. The album produced six singles; "Duality", "Vermilion", "Vermilion, Pt. 2", "Before I Forget", "The Nameless", and "The Blister Exists". Slipknot recorded its first live album, 9.0: Live, while touring in support of the band's third album. Released on November 1, 2005 9.0: Live peaked at number 17 on the Billboard album charts. Touring in support of Vol. 3: (The Subliminal Verses) continued through 2004 and up to the end of 2005 before Slipknot went on hiatus for the second time.

In 2005, several members of Slipknot were involved in Roadrunner United: The All-Star Sessions, a collaborative album recorded by artists signed to Roadrunner Records for the label's 25th anniversary. 2006 saw Slipknot win their first Grammy Award, picking up the Best Metal Performance award for the single "Before I Forget". The single went on to be featured on the set list of Guitar Hero III: Legends of Rock. On December 5, 2006, Slipknot released its third DVD Voliminal: Inside the Nine. While Slipknot was on hiatus, several band members again focused their attentions on side projects; vocalist Taylor and guitarist Root returned to Stone Sour, drummer Jordison toured with several bands and produced 3 Inches of Blood's third album Fire Up the Blades, Crahan founded Dirty Little Rabbits and Wilson returned as DJ Starscream once again.

=== All Hope Is Gone and Gray's death (2008–2010) ===
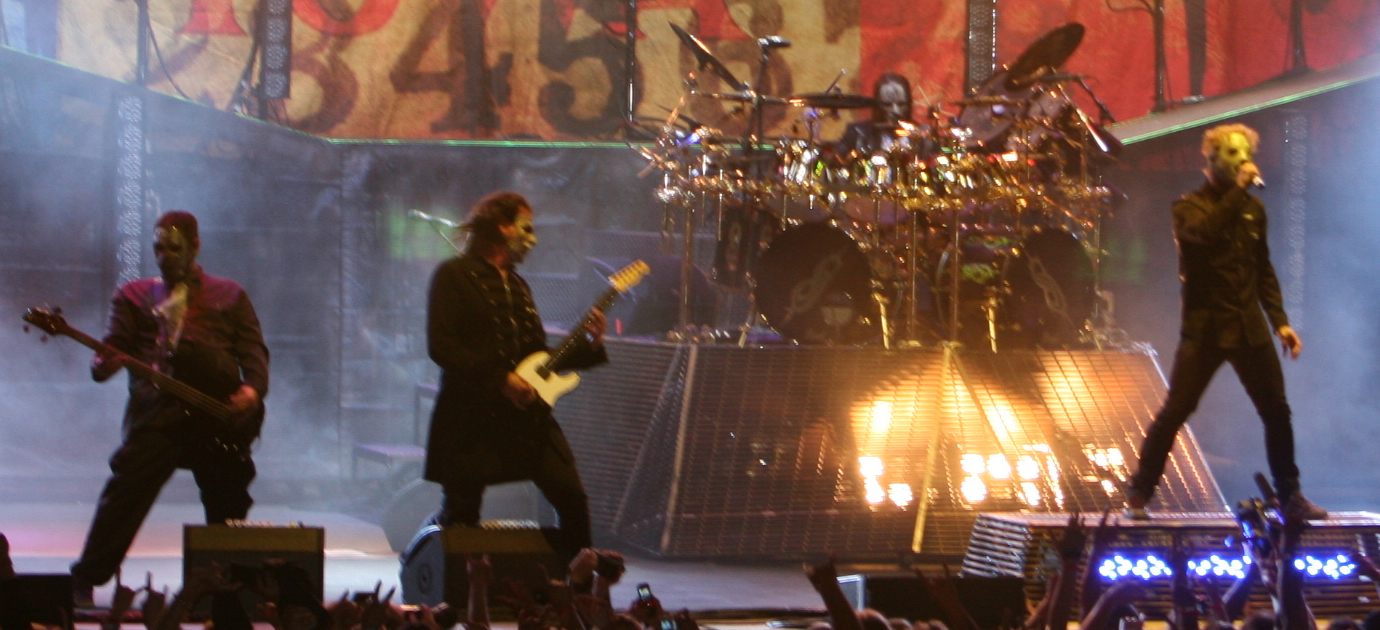
Slipknot performing in 2008. Paul Gray (left) died on May 24, 2010.

Preparation for Slipknot's fourth album began towards the end of 2007; work began at Sound Farm Studio in Jamaica, Iowa, with producer Dave Fortman in February 2008. The album was finished in June, and the band went on the All Hope Is Gone World Tour on July 9, 2008. Slipknot's fourth album, All Hope Is Gone, was released on August 20, 2008, debuting at number one on the Billboard albums chart. The album produced five singles; "All Hope Is Gone", "Psychosocial", "Dead Memories", "Sulfur" and "Snuff". 2009 marked the 10th anniversary of Slipknot's debut album; to commemorate the event, the band released a special-edition version of Slipknot on September 9, 2009. The band toured in support of the album throughout 2008 and continued until October 31, 2009, resulting in Slipknot's third hiatus.

He was everything that was wonderful about this band and about this group of people. The only way I can sum up Paul Gray is 'love'.

— Vocalist Corey Taylor, on the death of Paul Gray

In 2010, Gray was planning to tour with the supergroup, Hail!, but on May 24, 2010, he was found dead in an Urbandale, Iowa, hotel room. Circumstances surrounding his death at the time were not immediately known; an autopsy suspected his death was not intentional but did not reveal the cause. The day after his death, the remaining eight members of the band held a live, unmasked, press conference alongside Gray's widow and brother. On June 21, the cause of death was confirmed as an accidental overdose of morphine and synthetic morphine substitute fentanyl.

The band was hesitant to comment on the future of Slipknot. The members made conflicting statements in interviews; drummer Jordison told The Pulse of Radio "there is another Slipknot record already kinda in the making". Vocalist Taylor told FMQB Productions he was "very conflicted about whether or not [he wants] to do anything with Slipknot". The band released their fourth video album (sic)nesses on September 28, 2010; it debuted at number one on the Billboard Top Music Video Charts. The DVD features Slipknot's entire live performance at the 2009 Download Festival and a 45-minute film documenting their tour in support of All Hope Is Gone, and served as a tribute to Paul Gray.

=== Return to the stage, Antennas to Hell and Knotfest (2011–2012) ===
If this tour doesn't work, this band might be over—straight up. And I'm not gonna lie; I'm not the guy that's going to lie to the fans.

— Vocalist Corey Taylor on the future of Slipknot

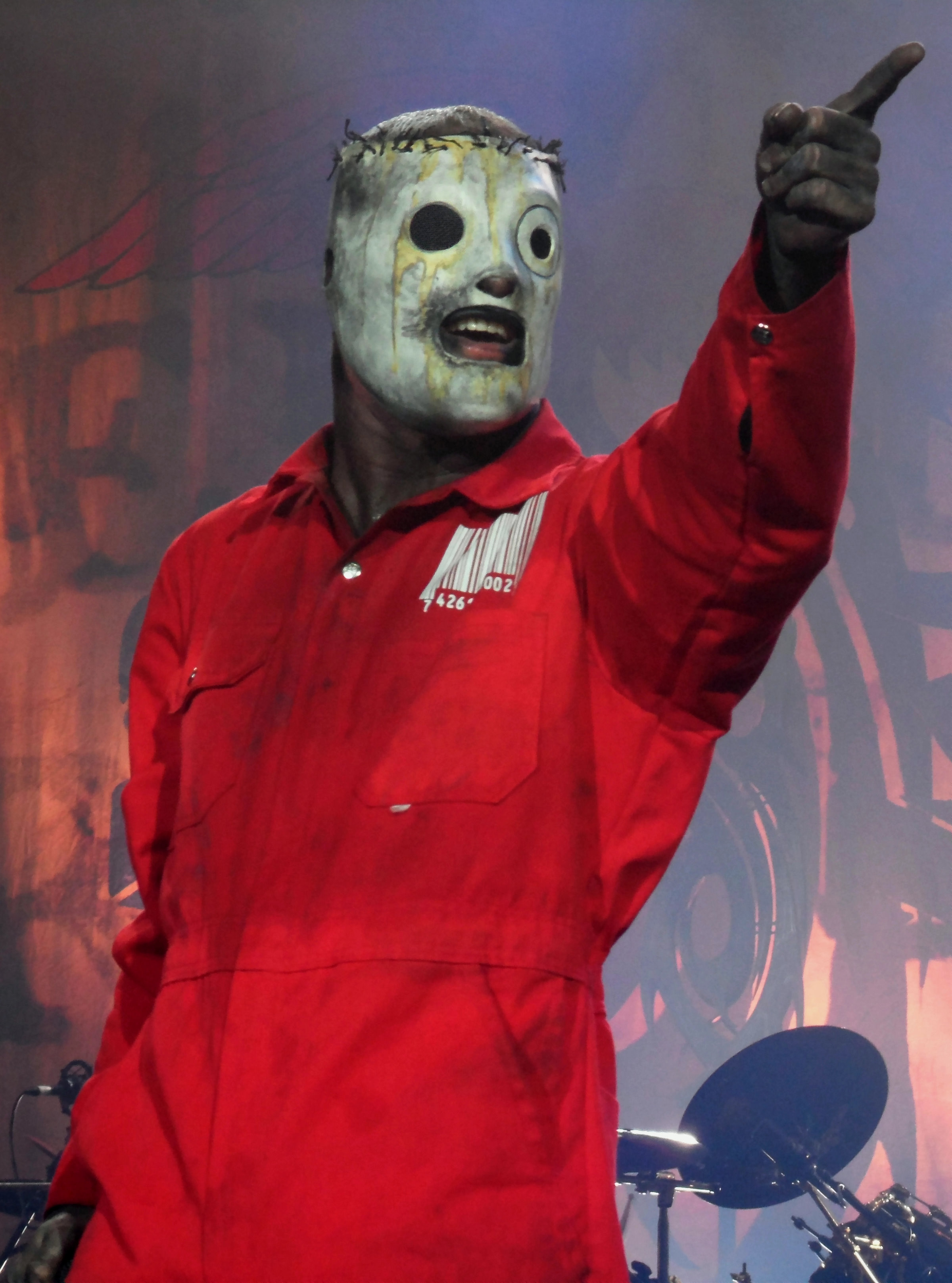
Corey Taylor performing with Slipknot in 2011

Regarding the continuation of Slipknot, Taylor told NME Gray would want them to continue and he felt they should but he was ambivalent about returning to the band. Slipknot returned to touring in 2011, performing a small number of shows in Europe. They headlined the Sonisphere Festival and Rock in Rio alongside Iron Maiden and Metallica, and performed at Belgium's Graspop Metal Meeting. Donnie Steele substituted for Gray in the concerts; he was positioned behind Jordison and obscured from the audience's view.

Slipknot also said the band would complete and release the band's fifth studio album, and that there were no plans to replace Gray. Jordison said the writing process for the album had already begun and that he had written 17 songs. Slipknot performed at the Mayhem Festival tour of 2012.

On May 29, 2012, Roadrunner Records posted a teaser video titled Antennas to Hell on its website. Later that day, on Twitter, Corey Taylor said Slipknot will release a greatest hits album on June 17, 2012. He also said the band was not yet recording new material but was putting together demos for a new album.

Slipknot's first annual music festival, called Knotfest, was held on August 17, 2012, at Mid-America Motorplex near Pacific Junction, Iowa, and on August 18, 2012, in Somerset, Wisconsin. Deftones, Lamb of God, and Serj Tankian also performed at the festival. The festival shows also debuted a Slipknot museum. On June 14, 2013, Slipknot headlined the Download Festival for a second time. The band performed to roughly 90,000 people and was twice forced to stop the set—once in the middle of a song—to allow the front barricade, which had split open under crowd pressure, to be repaired.

=== Jordison's departure, .5: The Gray Chapter and new members (2013–2016) ===
Production of the band's fifth album began in late 2013. Taylor described the album as "very dark" and a cross between Iowa and Vol. 3 (The Subliminal Verses). Guitarist Jim Root did not participate in Stone Sour's January tour so he could write material for Slipknot.

I want to make it very clear that I Did Not Quit Slipknot. This band has been my life for the last 18 years, and I would never abandon it, or my fans.

— Joey Jordison via Facebook

On December 12, 2013, the band announced through its official website that Joey Jordison had left the band after 18 years, citing personal reasons. On his official Facebook page, Jordison later said he "did not quit Slipknot" and that he was "shocked" and "blindsided" by the news. Both Jordison and Slipknot independently promised to release further details about the split. Taylor said Jordison would not be appearing on the new album because he did not participate in any songwriting sessions before his departure. After years of both sides being silent and evasive as to the reasons for his leaving the band, Jordison revealed in June 2016 that he suffered from transverse myelitis, a neurological disease that cost him the ability to play the drums toward the end of his time with Slipknot. However, Jordison played drums in the blackened death metal act Sinsaenum, which he joined in 2016.

In July 2014, Slipknot began releasing teasers for the new album on the band's website and social media using cryptic messages and gory imagery. "The Negative One", the band's first song in six years, was released on August 1; it was accompanied by a music video directed by Crahan that was released four days later. The video did not feature any band members. On August 24, Slipknot released an official radio single titled "The Devil In I", and the name of the upcoming album was announced as .5: The Gray Chapter on iTunes, with an expected release date of October 28. The release was later preponed to October 17 for the Netherlands and Australia, October 20 for the UK and October 21 worldwide. "The Negative One" was nominated for the 2014 Grammy Award for Best Metal Performance at the 57th Annual Grammy Awards.

Slipknot began touring North America in support of the album on October 25 at the second iteration of Knotfest. The tour dubbed the "Prepare for Hell" was co-headlined by Korn with King 810 as support. The band also performed at 2015's Soundwave festival in Australia. A bassist and drummer were brought in to replace Gray and Jordison respectively, Crahan designing a mask that would differentiate them from the band. The official video for "The Devil In I", featuring musicians wearing modified versions of the band's old masks—with the exception of Taylor, Wilson and Crahan who all wore new masks — was released on September 12. Fans speculated upon the identities of the drummer and bassist shown in the video but the band did not officially name them.

Taylor later said he was "upset" at the leak of the identity of the bassist, alleged to be Alessandro Venturella because of a unique tattoo on his hand, though he would later clarify that he meant that in jest. Root told Guitar World the drummer's identity would not be released, and that the bassist and the drummer were not permanent members of the band. On December 3, a former Slipknot road crew member posted a photograph of a touring band personnel list that confirmed bassist Alessandro Venturella and drummer Jay Weinberg were members of the tour.

On March 11, 2015, while the band was not touring, guitarist Mick Thomson was hospitalized after a drunken knife fight with his brother at Thomson's home in Iowa. The pair sustained serious, but non life-threatening, injuries. On August 2, 2015, during a concert in Hartford, Connecticut, the band was forced to stop performing after Venturella was suddenly rushed to hospital, after undergoing a medical emergency. After 20 minutes, singer Taylor told the audience the band would continue the concert, performing without Venturella. It was later discovered that Venturella had collapsed because of extreme dehydration.

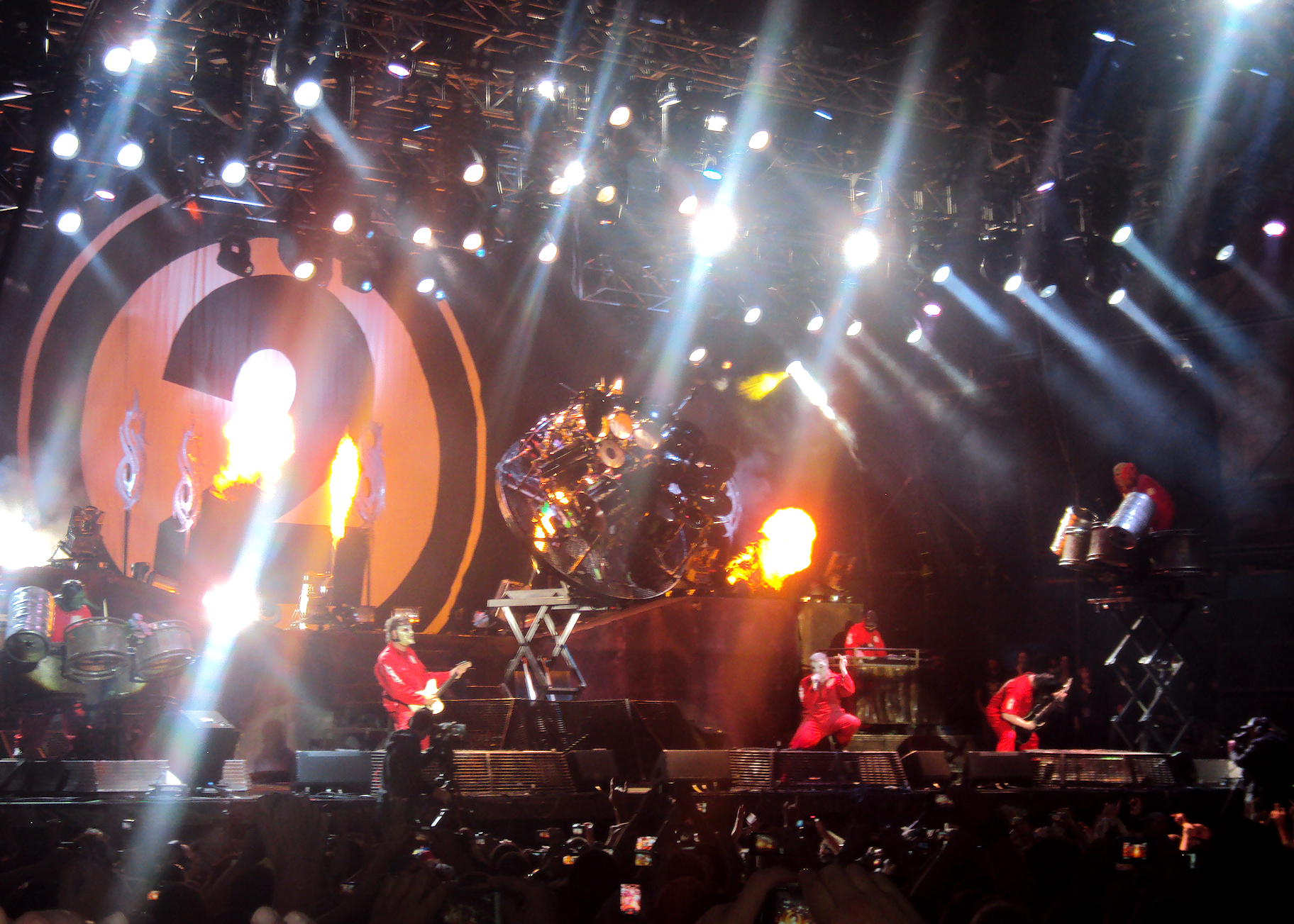
Slipknot at Soundwave Festival 2012

On September 25, 2016, the band performed at their annual festival Knotfest, which was altered to include Ozzfest this year. They performed the Iowa album in its entirety. In the meanwhile, Crahan made his directorial debut with the feature film Officer Downe, based on a graphic novel of the same name and starring actor Kim Coates. In November 2016, Slipknot percussionist Shawn "Clown" Crahan revealed during an interview with Rolling Stone that he and fellow guitarist Jim Root would be teaming up in February 2017 to begin writing new material for a new Slipknot album because "we want to write."

=== We Are Not Your Kind and Fehn's departure (2017–2020) ===
Slipknot singer Corey Taylor regrouped with his other band Stone Sour in 2017, and they released their album Hydrograd on June 30. Talking about his first work in cinema and the other Slipknot members' plans, in an interview with WRIF's Meltdown, Crahan revealed that "we're beginning to write some music for Slipknot for the new record. We have songs that we've written that are amazing." In December 2017, Crahan appeared on The Jasta Show podcast, where he stated that the next Slipknot album could be his last with the band.

Corey Taylor revealed in October 2018 that the band would enter the studio in early 2019, with a targeted release for their sixth album that same year, followed by a world tour. On October 31, the single "All Out Life" was released, as was an accompanying music video. On March 4, 2019, the band announced that the release date for the next album would be August 9, 2019, and that they would be embarking on the Knotfest Roadshow along with support by Gojira, Volbeat, and Behemoth to support the album. On March 7, Slipknot were revealed to be the opening act for Metallica's six WorldWired Tour dates in Australia and New Zealand from October 17 through October 31.

On March 14, 2019, Chris Fehn filed a lawsuit against the band citing withheld payments. Fehn specifically accused Corey Taylor and Shawn Crahan of setting up several band-related business entities, in different states, that collect money from the band. Fehn called for full forensic accounting to be done on all of the band's companies and assets in order to collect any profits and damages he may be owed. On that same day, Taylor responded via Twitter with a tweet stating, "You're gonna read a lot of bullshit today. This is all I'll say. JUST YOU WAIT TIL THE TRUTH COMES OUT. Long Live The Knot". On March 18, 2019, the band officially announced via their website that Fehn was no longer a member of the band, stating, "Slipknot's focus is on making album No. 6, and our upcoming shows around the world, our best ever. Chris knows why he is no longer a part of Slipknot. We are disappointed that he chose to point fingers and manufacture claims, rather than doing what was necessary to continue to be a part of Slipknot. We would have preferred he not take the path that he has, but evolution in all things is a necessary part of this life. Long Live The Knot". However, a few days later, the message was removed from the website and according to Fehn's lawyer, the percussionist's employment status with the band had not changed since his initial filing. Fehn was replaced by a percussionist, whose identity was concealed, who the fans have dubbed "Tortilla Man". Loudwire has reported that fans have linked his identity as Michael Pfaff, a former member of Crahan's side project Dirty Little Rabbits. The band officially confirmed Pfaff's identity on March 16, 2022, almost two years later.

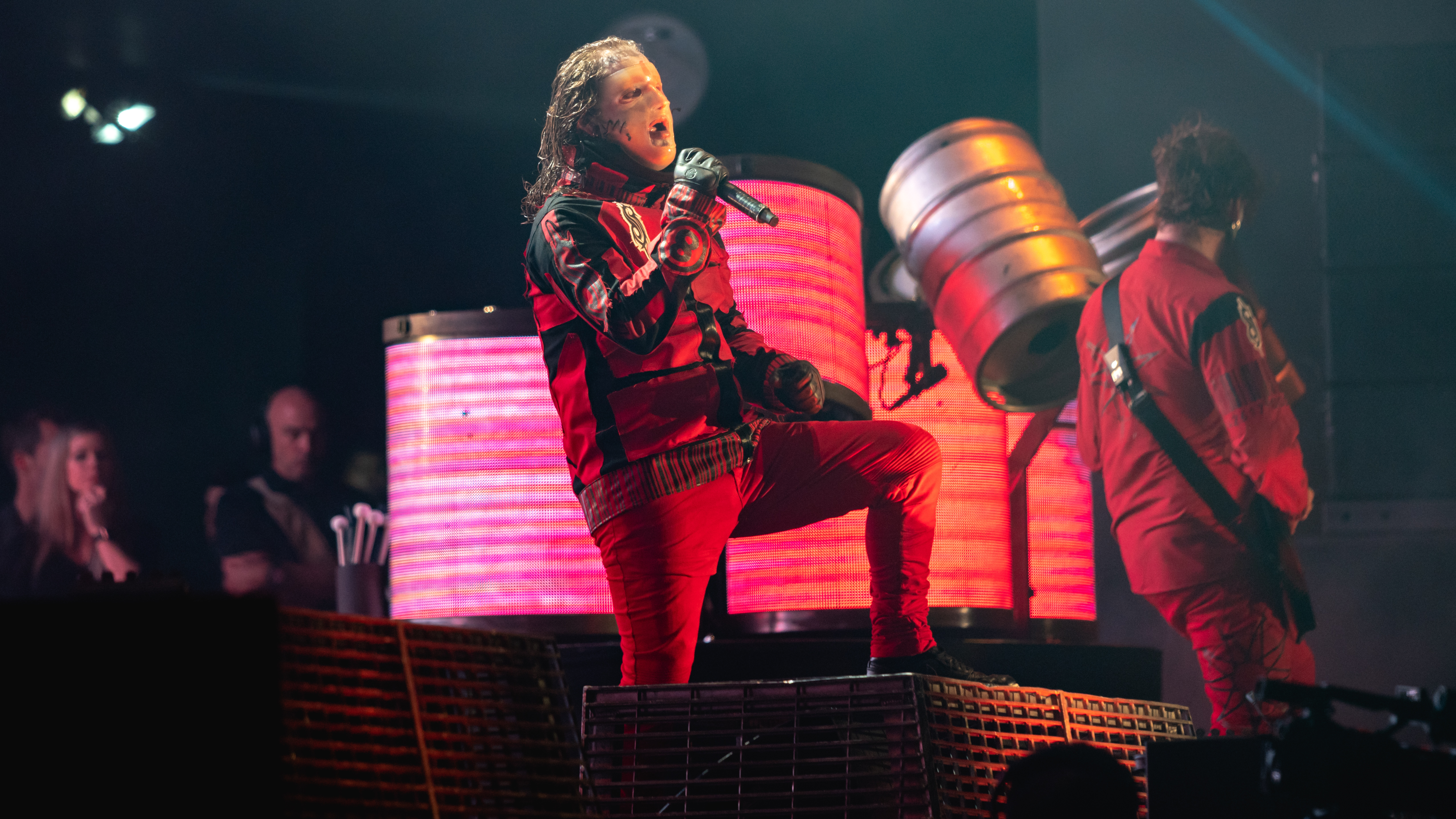
Slipknot performing in Peru in 2019

On May 13, 2019, the band teased something was coming on May 16, ahead of their performance on Jimmy Kimmel Live!, as well as screenshots of their new masks. On that day, the album's title was revealed to be We Are Not Your Kind, along with its tracklist and a music video for "Unsainted", where the new masks and outfits for the nine band members were shown for the first time, including an as-yet-unknown new percussionist. On July 22, they released the second single from their upcoming album, titled "Solway Firth". This was accompanied by a music video which featured live footage from their 2019 shows as well as clips and audio from The Boys. On August 5, "Birth of the Cruel" was released as the album's third single, accompanied by a music video. On August 9, four days after they had released "Birth of the Cruel", they released their sixth album We Are Not Your Kind.

In August 2019, Crahan announced the band will release an experimental album of outtakes from the 2008 All Hope Is Gone sessions, titled Look Outside Your Window. The album was recorded with just 4 members (Crahan, Taylor, Root, and Wilson), in a different studio away from the other members, is expected to have 11 tracks that Taylor described as having a "Radiohead vibe", and Crahan saying in 2018 "it is not a Slipknot album". The band also released a twenty-minute experimental short film directed by Crahan and titled Pollution. One of the segments of the film is the music video for the song, "Nero Forte", which was released as the album's fourth and final single on December 16, 2019.

=== The End, So Far and Jones' and Weinberg's departures (2021–2023) ===
On May 19, 2021, Shawn Crahan revealed that the band had been currently making "god music". In an article published by Loudwire on June 9, 2021, Shawn Crahan revealed that a new Slipknot album would 'hopefully' be released in 2021. He also added that the band would be parting ways with Roadrunner Records following the release of the album.

On July 26, 2021, the band's former drummer, Joey Jordison, died in his sleep at the age of 46.

In November 2021, the band started teasing new material on a new domain thechapeltownrag.com. Several snippets of a song were shown on the website leading to speculation of a new single that the band would later confirm on November 4, with the single titled "The Chapeltown Rag" slated for release the following day alongside its live debut at the Knotfest Roadshow in Los Angeles, California, on November 5, 2021. In December 2021, Taylor revealed that the band were planning on mixing their seventh studio album in January, and hoped to release it by April 2022. He also stated that he preferred the material on their forthcoming seventh studio album to that on We Are Not Your Kind.

On July 19, 2022, the band announced their seventh album, titled The End, So Far, along with the album's second single "The Dying Song (Time to Sing)". On August 5, 2022, the third single from the album, "Yen", was released. The album was released on September 30, 2022. It is Slipknot's final album for Roadrunner, whose contract with the label expired on April 1, 2023. The band's final single for the label, "Bone Church" was surprise-released on February 2, 2023.

On June 7, 2023, the band announced that it had parted ways with sampler and keyboardist Craig "133" Jones, who had been a member since 1996; the social media posts about Jones' departure were subsequently deleted within the hour. The same day, the band played a show at the Nova Rock Festival in Austria, with someone who appeared to be a new member of the band replacing Jones. There has been speculation on who the new member is, with the main contenders being Zac Baird, Nathan Church or Jones himself in a new mask. On November 5, the band announced that they had parted ways with Jay Weinberg; like with Jones, social media posts about his departure were subsequently deleted.

On December 9, 2023, the band announced the first leg of their 25th anniversary tour with stops in the UK and Europe.

=== 25th anniversary touring, Casagrande's joining, Wilson's departure and upcoming eighth studio album (2024–present) ===
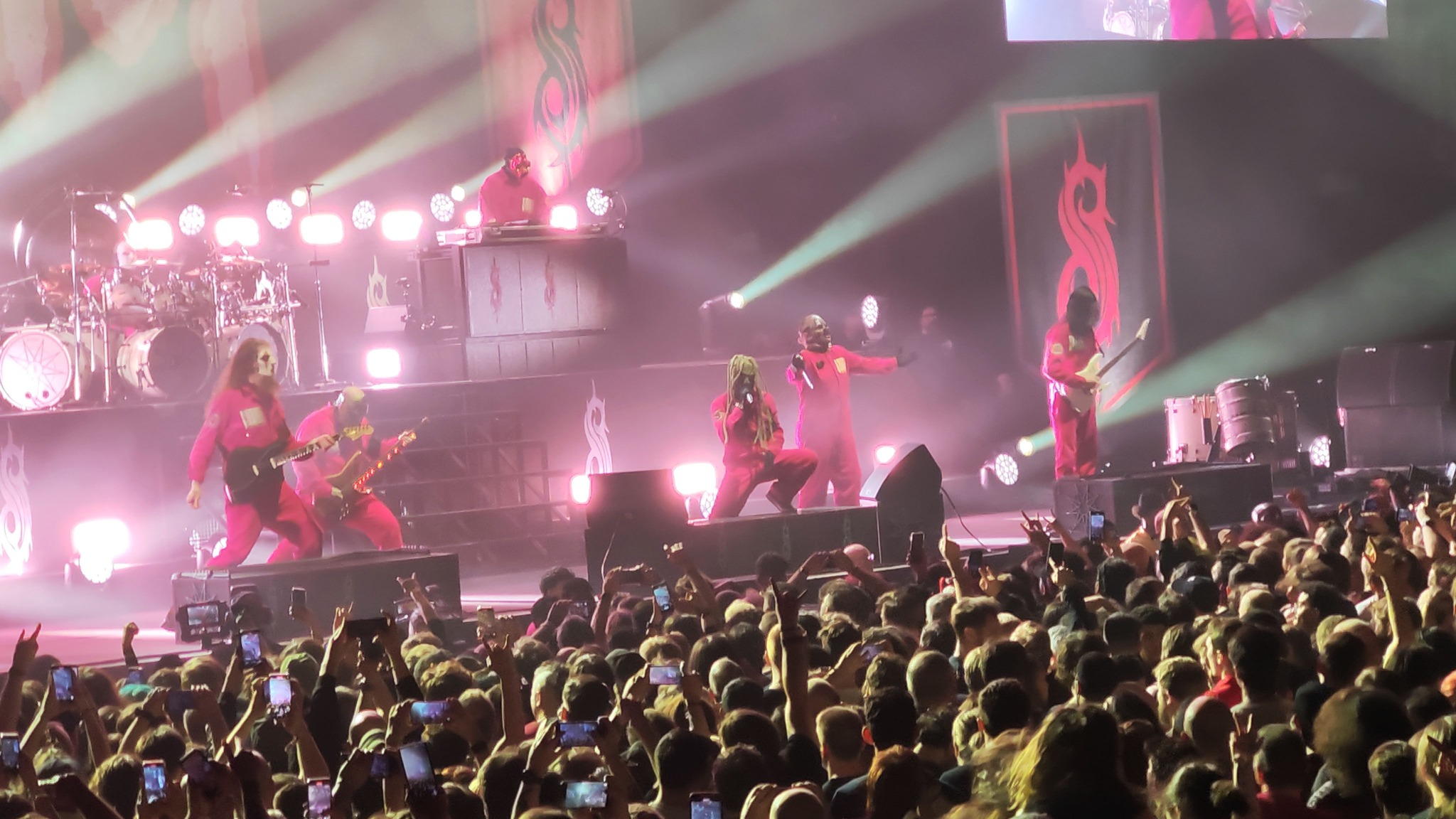
Slipknot performing at the O2 Arena in December 2024

In April 2024, Slipknot began teasing events for the 25th anniversary of their debut album. In the metadata for the promotional material, fans found the names "Jeff" and "Eloy", leading to speculation that the new sampler and drummer are ex-Dirty Little Rabbits bassist Jeff Karnowski and former Sepultura drummer Eloy Casagrande, respectively. Casagrande's identity would be confirmed shortly afterwards, when he debuted as the band's drummer at a warm-up show at Pappy & Harriet's Palace, California.

On January 8, 2025, Shawn Crahan revealed that the new album is in the works in an interview at Knotfest.

On November 18, 2025, Harbourview Equity Partners announced that the purchase of a majority stake in Slipknot's catalog was made. On July 31, 2026, TMZ reported that Wilson was permanently removed from Slipknot, although without confirmation by the band or Wilson himself. The band's lead guitarist Jim Root stated about the report, "Don’t believe everything you read." On August 14, 2026, Slipknot announced that they had parted ways with Wilson; however, the post was deleted shortly afterwards.

On September 8, Root confirmed on his social media that the tracking for the new album was currently in progress. The following day, the band released new surprise standalone single "Arsenal". It is their first song released under their independent label (Sic)est Records.

On September 28, Slipknot announced the (sic)est Stadium Tour with support from Bring Me the Horizon, Marilyn Manson, and a rotation of North American openers including Lamb of God, Motionless in White, and Vended. This announcement follows a set of posters featuring the band's logo and the names of major cities including Boston, Chicago, Bogotá, and more.

== Artistry ==
=== Musical style and classification ===
Slipknot is most often considered a nu metal, alternative metal and groove metal band, or heavy metal in general. (Note: The following references categorize Slipknot music as the genres: Nu-metal; alternative metal; groove metal; and heavy metal.) They have included elements of death metal, hard rock, grindcore, and rap metal. (Note: The following references categorize Slipknot music as including elements of the genres: Death metal; hard rock; grindcore; and rap metal.) The album All Hope Is Gone is considered groove metal, with elements of death metal and thrash metal. Metal Hammer noted that Slipknot were "far heavier than the average nu-metal band" when they performed the style. A hallmark of the band's sound is groove metal, which has drawn comparisons to Pantera. The band also frequently uses repetition, which Blabbermouth linked to thrash metal.

The band's members prefer to distance themselves musically from other nu metal bands such as Korn and Limp Bizkit. Slipknot describes its sound as "metal metal" and regards the link to nu metal as coincidental and a result of nu metal's emergence being concurrent with that of Slipknot. The band's sound typically features a heavily down-tuned guitar setup, a large percussive section, sampling, keyboards and DJing/turntablism. Using a variety of vocal styles, the music typically features growled vocals, screaming, backing vocals, as well as melodic singing. The band has continually experimented with its sound, most notably developing tracks led by acoustic guitars and melodic singing that first appeared on Vol. 3 (The Subliminal Verses). Corey Taylor said the following regarding his feelings towards the nu metal tag: "As far as labeling Slipknot a nu-metal thing, I think that really kind of came down to: The timing when we came out and the fact that we were still kind of using a lot of hip-hop elements and whatnot. But I think, honestly, we were more of a precursor to what they call the New Wave of American Heavy Metal. I thought we were kind of filling in that gap. But look at the bands that have stood the test. We're mentioned in the same breath as Korn, Deftones, White Zombie and Rob Zombie... I mean, those are good names to be associated with. They're still around doing it, they're some of my good friends and they're still pushing the boundaries musically."

The track "All Hope is Gone" contains elements of metalcore. According to Revolver: "The way Corey Taylor's shouty vocals soar over the chuggy riffage sounds kind of like Hatebreed crossed with Biohazard, and the gang vocals add a raw gnarliness."

=== Lyrical themes ===
Slipknot's lyrics are generally very aggressive; they sometimes include profanity while exploring themes such as darkness, nihilism, anger, disaffection, love, misanthropy, and psychosis. They often draw upon topics including the music industry, politics, personal strife, and reflection, among others. Rick Anderson of AllMusic said, "those lyrics that are discernible are not generally quotable on a family website". On Vol. 3, Taylor deliberately avoided using profanity in response to claims he relied on it.

=== Influences ===
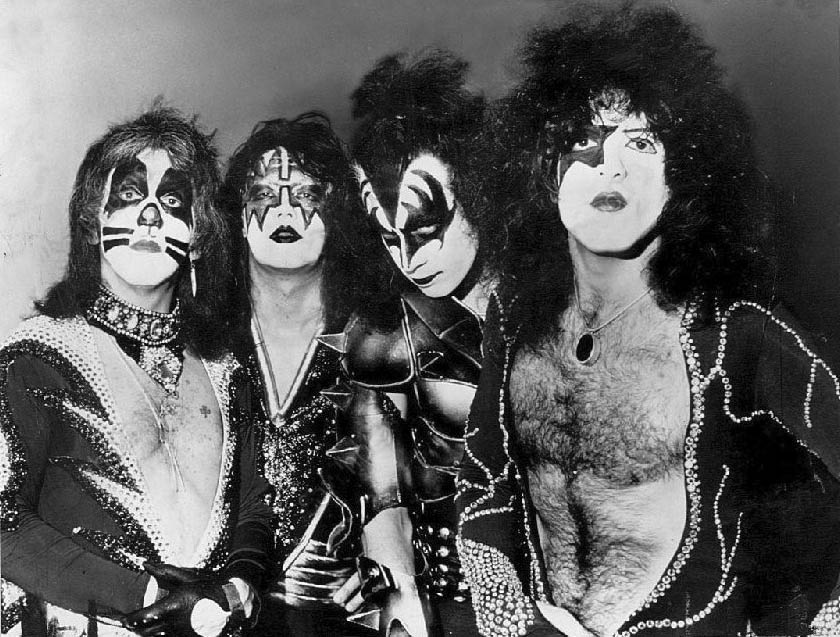
American hard rock band Kiss (pictured in 1976) is among Slipknot's influences.

Slipknot cited both Korn's self-titled album of 1994 and Limp Bizkit's album Three Dollar Bill, Y'all of 1997 as major influences. However, the band's biggest influence, both on their image and music, has been singer Mike Patton and his bands Mr. Bungle, Fantômas and Faith No More. Corey Taylor even stated that watching Faith No More perform on the 1990 MTV Video Music Awards saved his life. In an interview in 2000 Patton called the Slipknot members "really nice guys".

The band Kiss has been a big influence for Slipknot, both musically and image-wise. Several band members have in numerous interviews stated the impact Kiss had on them when growing up. In an interview with Revolver magazine, Joey Jordison said that "I saw Kiss on The Dick Clark Show in like, 1980 or something, and Kiss Alive! was the first record of theirs I had. This was back when you bought cassettes or records, and I still have my original cassette copy of it. And I tell you what, it just blew my mind! The cover tells you everything you need to know; it just makes you want to listen to the whole fucking record. And these guys look like fucking demons — you don't know when you're a kid and you're watching them on TV that it's just guys in makeup. So yeah, it was inspiring back then. They were a huge influence on me when I was a kid. And that record came out in 1975, so I was always like, "That's fucking badass — one of my favorite records of all time came out the year I was born!"". In another interview with Loudwire, he also added that after listening to Kiss Alive! for the first time, he was "changed forever, and then [he] just became completely engulfed in metal." Guitarist Mick Thomson revealed in Metal Hammer that Kiss' Destroyer was the first album he ever bought, and when talking about Kiss' Alive II; he stated that "...the artwork on Alive II with Gene's sweat running, the blood coming from his face and the make-up running had a profound influence on me. You only have to look at my own band to see how much so." Vocalist Corey Taylor has stated that Kiss were a huge influence on both him and the rest of the band and he has also covered multiple Kiss songs over the years; both as a solo artist as well as with Stone Sour, in which Slipknot guitarist Jim Root also played at the time.

Many authors single out the massive influence that experimental band Mr. Bungle has had on Slipknot; in the late 1980s and early 1990s, the members of Mr. Bungle donned strange masks (often clown and gimp ones), costumes (including jumpsuits) and hid their identities behind obscure pseudonyms. All of these were major features on their 1991 self-titled album cycle. Their creepy music videos from that record, such as "Travolta" which was banned on MTV, also pointed out at what would be the future image of Slipknot. (Note: In their 2000 appearance on the music TV show Rage, the members of Slipknot programmed this video.) In the same way, the musical influence of Mr. Bungle is evident in the eclecticism and adventurousness throughout Mate. Feed. Kill. Repeat., Slipknot's first release of 1996, although the band added more metallic elements. A few songs on that album also hint at the eccentric catchiness of Faith No More and other funk metal bands. Mr. Bungle drummer Danny Heifetz heavily influenced Slipknot drummer Joey Jordison.

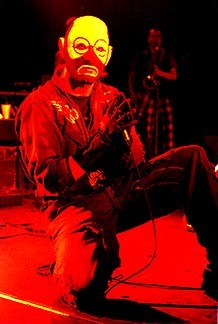
Mike Patton (pictured wearing a mechanic's jumpsuit and a clown mask with Mr. Bungle in 1991)

While Slipknot was making its debut studio release, the entire band attended one of the first shows by avant-garde grindcore supergroup Fantômas-composed of Patton, Slayer's Dave Lombardo, Melvins' Buzz Osborne and Mr. Bungle's Trevor Dunn-which greatly influenced them at the time. From that album on, Slipknot has displayed a much more straightforward, extreme metal sound, largely because of producer Ross Robinson, and some writers have identified the influence of Faith No More on some tracks' structures and alternating melodies from Iowa and Vol. 3: (The Subliminal Verses). On the other hand, the experimental imprint of Bungle has become rare, but it made a sudden reappearance on 2019's We Are Not Your Kind.

The members of Slipknot were influenced by hard rock and heavy metal artists such as Black Sabbath, Judas Priest, Jimi Hendrix, Kiss, Led Zeppelin, Queen, Iron Maiden, Venom and Mercyful Fate, thrash metal bands Exodus, Anthrax, Megadeth, Metallica, Metal Church, Slayer, Testament and Flotsam and Jetsam, groove metal bands Pantera, Sepultura and White Zombie, sludge metal bands Acid Bath, The Melvins and Neurosis, and various black and death metal bands Cannibal Corpse, Deicide, Dimmu Borgir, Emperor, Gorefest, Malevolent Creation, Mayhem and Morbid Angel. They were also influenced by punk and new wave bands such as Black Flag, Dead Kennedys, Misfits and the Police, grunge and alternative rock bands Alice in Chains and Pearl Jam, hip-hop artists Beastie Boys, N.W.A and Run-DMC, and industrial rock artists Nine Inch Nails and Skinny Puppy. Taylor has spoken of his admiration for vocalists Freddie Mercury, Bruce Dickinson, David Lee Roth, Bruce Springsteen and James Hetfield. In 1999, Chris Fehn said Sid Wilson is influenced by jungle music and rave music.

On The End, So Far Corey Taylor also cited The Cure, Death, the Prodigy and Type O Negative as inspirations for the album.

=== Stage performances ===
Slipknot is known for its chaotic, energetic live shows that contributed to the band's success. During performances, most of the band's members headbang heavily. The band's early performances included extreme acts such as stage dives from high balconies and band members setting each other on fire. Clown was known to go into the crowd and tie people up with the microphone cord. In later years, they tended to refrain from acts this extreme. Former bassist Paul Gray said this was due to receiving lawsuits and to avoid harming other people, and that it was a "better move" for the longevity of the band. Along with the energetic and unpredictable performances, Slipknot often use elaborate stage setups that use pyrotechnics, elevated stage areas, hydraulic drum risers, and computer screens. Reviewing a Slipknot performance, Alistair Lawrence of Kerrang! said, "the choreographed chaos is too multi-faceted to fully describe". and NME described one Slipknot show as "a scene of chaos". At their first 2022 show, the band paid tribute to fellow metal band Jinjer and mentioned the 2022 Russian invasion of Ukraine as cause for their absence.

== Image and identities ==
The band is known for its attention-grabbing image; the members perform wearing unique, individual facemasks and matching uniforms—typically jumpsuits—while each member is typically assigned and referred to by number based on their role in the band (No. 0 through No. 8), although the latter practice has diminished following the death of Paul Gray.

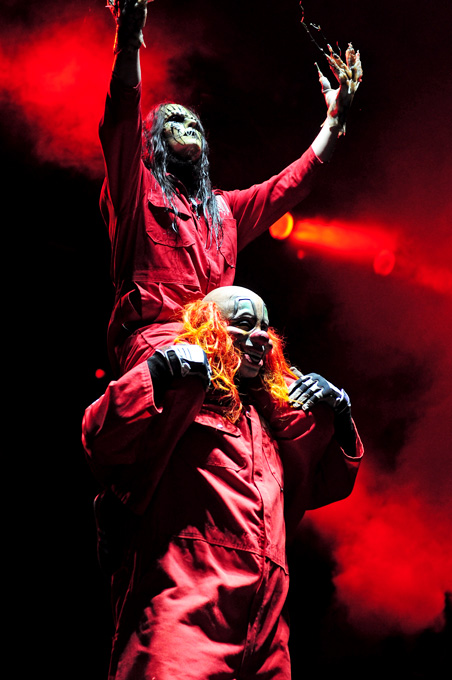
Shawn Crahan (bottom) and Joey Jordison (top) wearing variations of their masks while performing in 2012

The band has said the idea of wearing masks stemmed from a clown mask that Crahan took to rehearsals when the band first started. Crahan later became known for his clown masks, adopting the pseudonym "Clown". The concept developed; by late 1997, the band decided every band member would wear a unique mask and matching jumpsuit. Taylor said in 2002, "it's our way of becoming more intimate with the music. It's a way for us to become unconscious of who we are and what we do outside of music. It's a way for us to kind of crawl inside it and be able to use it." The concept of wearing matching jumpsuits has been described as a response to commercialism in the music industry and led to the idea of assigning the band members numerical aliases. According to Taylor, "Originally, we were just going to wear the jumpsuits ... we figured we might as well take that further and number ourselves ... We were basically saying, 'Hey, we're a product!'".

During their careers, the members of Slipknot have developed their images, updating their uniforms and each member's mask upon the release of each album. The appearance and style of the masks do not usually differ significantly between albums; members typically maintain the established theme of their mask while adding new elements. Jordison, in an interview in 2004, said the masks are updated to show growth within each individual. Slipknot's members have worn special masks for specific occasions, most notably for the music video and live performances of "Vermilion" in 2004 and 2005 when they wore life masks made from casts of their own faces. In 2008, the band wore a set of large masks titled "purgatory masks" during photograph shoots before the release of All Hope Is Gone; in the music video for "Psychosocial" they are seen burning them. Shortly after its inception, Slipknot's masks were homemade, but since 2000 they have been custom-made by special effect artist and musician Screaming Mad George.

The band's image has been the subject of much criticism and controversy, with critics generally accusing it of being a sales gimmick. The band's members object to these claims; according to them the masks are used to divert attention from themselves and put it on the music. Several band members have said wearing the masks helps to maintain privacy in their personal lives. During an interview in 2005, percussionist Fehn said the masks were a "blessing" because they meant the members are not recognized in public.

In 2012, Slipknot released an app for iOS and Android called Slipknot: Wear the Mask, which invites fans to construct their own masks, defining the kind of Slipknot fans they are.

The band's logo, the nonagram, was created by the band's members early on.

== Legacy ==
In 2016, the staff of Loudwire named Slipknot the 16th-greatest heavy metal band of all time. Slipknot has also been referred to as one of the "Big Four of 2000s metal", along with Avenged Sevenfold, Lamb of God and System of a Down. Lauryn Schaffner wrote the following for Loudwire in 2017: "It's impossible to discuss 21st century metal at all without mentioning Slipknot, let alone the 2000s. They helped bring extreme metal to the mainstream after they found great success early in the decade thanks to tours such as Ozzfest. [...] Slipknot's chaotic sound stood out against the rest of the heavy music landscape at the time and the emotional intensity and nihilistic attitude in the lyrics was a source of solace for the outcasts and the misunderstood. The music created a sense of unity amongst their fandom that made Slipknot a culture, not just a band. And even after all the lineup changes and tragedies they've endured, that culture is still as strong today."

Slipknot has inspired artists including Deafheaven, Code Orange, Knocked Loose, Vein.fm, Ho99o9, City Morgue, Demon Hunter, Cane Hill, Of Mice & Men, Suicide Silence, Whitechapel, Poorstacy, Loathe, Blood Youth, Bad Omens, Sleep Token, Slaughter to Prevail, Infant Annihilator, and Asking Alexandria.

== Clothing brand ==
Slipknot's clothing brand logo

In 2008, Slipknot launched their clothing line Tattered and Torn. Named after a song on their 1999 self-titled debut, the line runs as an imprint of Bravado, a company that runs the band's merchandising. While the band recognize that their merchandise is their biggest revenue income, they insist Tattered and Torn is more than just band merchandising. Vocalist Corey Taylor said, "It's a way for [the fans] to get cool clothing at affordable prices." The first items from the clothing line went on sale in late July 2008 through Hot Topic stores across North America and the Hot Topic website. Currently, the line is limited to shirts and hoodies but was expected to develop into a full-range clothing line.

== Controversies ==
Slipknot's music and image have been the subject of many controversies throughout its career. The lyrical content found in some of Slipknot's songs has been linked to several violent and criminal incidents.

Following the Erfurt school massacre in April of 2002, German media outlets began reporting that the shooter had been inspired by a Slipknot song titled "School Wars". The song reportedly contained the lyric "shoot your naughty teachers with a pump gun." These claims were refuted and later dismissed entirely when it was confirmed that Slipknot had never written such a song, or anything remotely similar. In 2003, two young killers blamed the lyrics of "Disasterpiece" for their crime. In 2006, the lyrics of "Surfacing" were found at the site of a grave robbery.

Slipknot's 2005 lawsuit against Burger King said the company created the advertising-based band Coq Roq to capitalize on Slipknot's image. Burger King responded with a countersuit, saying many other bands, such as Mr. Bungle, Mushroomhead, Mudvayne, Kiss, Insane Clown Posse, and Gwar have used masks as part of their images. After negotiations, the advertising campaign and lawsuit were withdrawn.

In 2008, Corey Taylor commented on a slashing incident at a South African school to which Slipknot was linked; he said:

...obviously, I'm disturbed by the fact that people were hurt and someone died, as far as my responsibility for that goes, it stops there, because I know our message is actually very positive...there are always going to be mental disorders and people who cause violence for no other reason than the fact that they're fucked up and lost.

== Feuds ==
=== Mushroomhead ===
Slipknot had a longstanding feud with the band Mushroomhead which—along with their fans—said Slipknot "stole their image". While Slipknot acknowledged their images had similarities, its members were not actively involved in the feud, saying the similarities were coincidental. Taylor said, "we both started at the same time—neither one of us knowing anything about each other". Taylor also said that at a live show in Cleveland, Ohio, several Mushroomhead fans threw objects including a fist-sized padlock at Slipknot and that when Slipknot's set was finished, Machine Head and Amen went into the crowd and "handled it right there". In 2009, former Mushroomhead vocalist Waylon Reavis said his band's members were no longer interested in feuding with Slipknot, saying, "they're not the first masked band, we're not, no one was". During an interview with Rock Rage Radio, Reavis praised Slipknot as he criticized his former bandmates after a dispute with the band's founding members which led to his dismissal. He stated that Slipknot was better and he admitted that his thoughts were personal, since he was not involved with Mushroomhead when the feud started.

=== Limp Bizkit ===
While on tour promoting anticipation for the release of their self-titled album in the spring of 1999, Taylor had taken notice of Korn drummer David Silveria in a promotional campaign for Calvin Klein at multiple truck stop kiosks. Taylor had expressed his disgust with the campaign, and had taken numerous copies of the magazine issues and burned them onstage during multiple live performances. Within hearing of the gesture; Limp Bizkit frontman Fred Durst (who was a friend of Silveria's), took offense at Taylor's actions. Durst would later make retaliatory comments towards Slipknot's fans in June 1999, referring to them as "fat, ugly kids". Slipknot singer Corey Taylor responded during an appearance in Sydney by claiming that the fans of Slipknot "for the most part, enjoy all kinds of music, like Limp Bizkit... maybe." Taylor went on to claim that insulting fans of Slipknot could also be insulting fans of Limp Bizkit. Despite the initial attacks between the two bands, they shared numerous UK festival dates together through 2000, including the 2000 Reading and Leeds Festivals. Durst later praised Slipknot's music during an October 2000 interview, though Taylor later criticized his artistic direction, claiming "Fred Durst is a great businessman, but he is not an artist".

Taylor and Durst would find themselves on friendlier terms in 2010, while Limp Bizkit was recording the album Gold Cobra; Durst included a line on the song "90.2.10" giving a shout out to Taylor. According to Taylor during a live interview in 2011, Durst's children were allegedly fans of Slipknot. Limp Bizkit was later booked on the 2014 Japanese leg of the Knotfest tour along with Korn.

In 2021, following Jordison's death, Limp Bizkit paid tribute to him at one of their shows in Iowa.

== Band members ==
=== Current ===
- (#6) Shawn "Clown" Crahan – percussion, backing and occasional lead vocals (1995–present), drums (1995)
- (#7) Mick Thomson – guitar (1996–present)
- (#8) Corey Taylor – lead vocals (1997–present)
- (#4) Jim Root – guitar (1999–present), bass (2011–2014; in-studio only)
- (V) Alessandro "Vman" Venturella – bass (2015–present; touring 2014–2015), keyboards (2018–2019; in-studio only)
- Michael "Tortilla Man" Pfaff – percussion, backing vocals, keyboards (2022–present; touring 2019–2022)
- Eloy Casagrande – drums (2024–present)

=== Touring ===
- Unknown musician – sampler, keyboards, percussion (2023–present)

== Awards and nominations ==
=== Grammy Awards and nominations ===
Slipknot have been nominated for eleven Grammy Awards and have won one.

Year	Nominee / work	Award	Result
2001	"Wait and Bleed"	Best Metal Performance	Nominated
2002	"Left Behind"	Best Metal Performance	Nominated
2003	"My Plague"	Best Metal Performance	Nominated
2005	"Duality"	Best Hard Rock Performance	Nominated
2005	"Vermilion"	Best Metal Performance	Nominated
2006	"Before I Forget"	Best Metal Performance	Won
2009	"Psychosocial"	Best Metal Performance	Nominated
2015	"The Negative One"	Best Metal Performance	Nominated
2016	"Custer"	Best Metal Performance	Nominated
2016	.5: The Gray Chapter	Best Rock Album	Nominated
2024	"Hive Mind"	Best Metal Performance	Nominated

== Discography ==
Studio albums

- Slipknot (1999)
- Iowa (2001)
- Vol. 3: (The Subliminal Verses) (2004)
- All Hope Is Gone (2008)
- .5: The Gray Chapter (2014)
- We Are Not Your Kind (2019)
- The End, So Far (2022)

== Notable tours ==
- World Domination Tour (1999–2000)
- Tattoo the Earth (2000)
- Iowa World Tour (2001–2002)
- The Subliminal Verses World Tour (2004–2005)
- All Hope Is Gone World Tour (2008–2009)
- Memorial World Tour (2011–2013)

As a support act

- Livin la Vida Loco Tour (1999)

Festivals

- Ozzfest (1999, 2001, 2004, 2005, 2013)
- Aftershock (2015, 2019, 2022, 2024)
- Knotfest (2012, 2014–present)
- Hammersonic (2023)
- Sick New World (2024)
