= Jay Weinberg =

American drummer

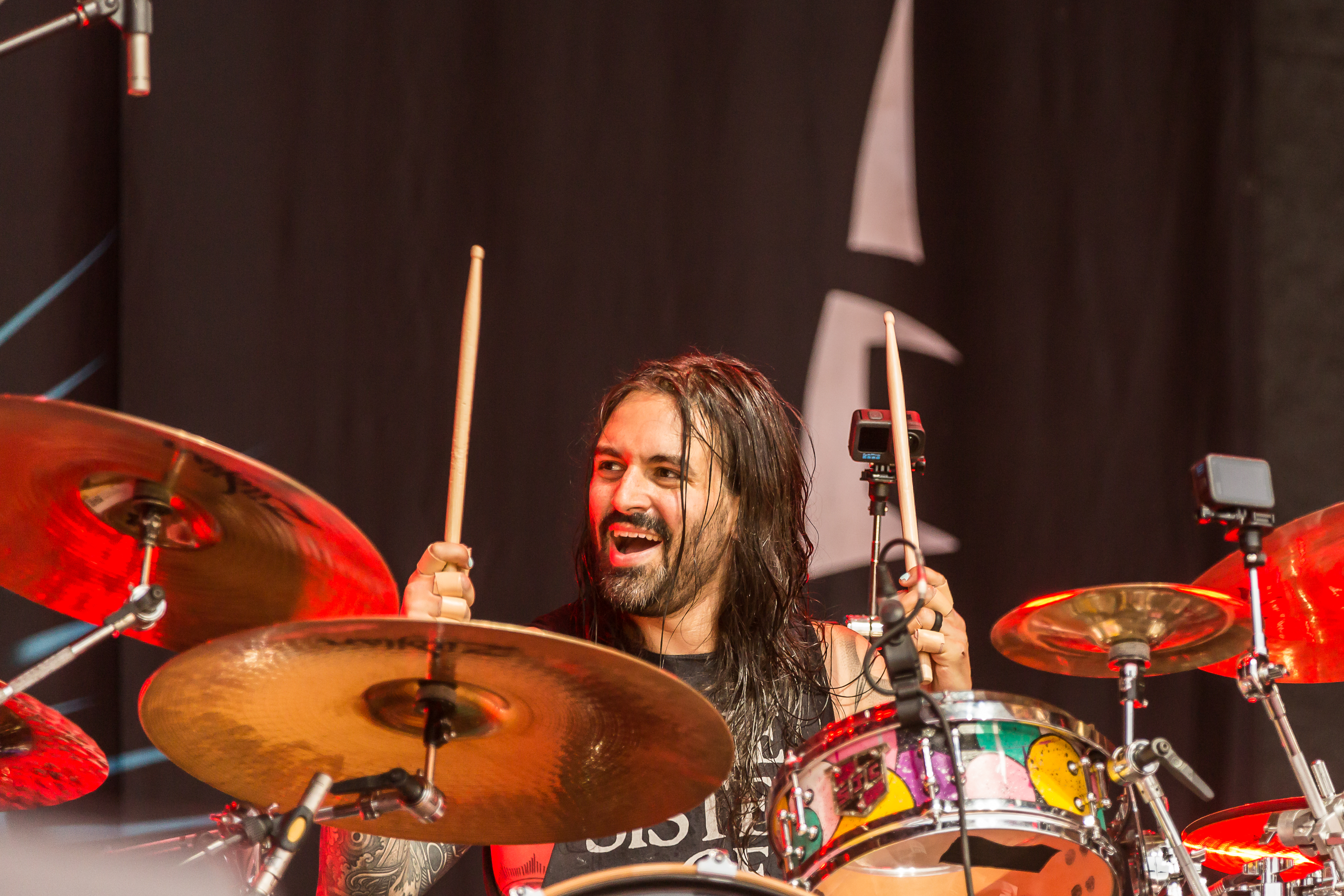
- Weinberg performing with Suicidal Tendencies in 2024

Background information
- Born: Jay Bradley Weinberg; September 8, 1990 (age 36)
- Origin: Middletown Township, New Jersey, U.S.
- Genres: Nu metal; groove metal; alternative metal; punk rock; hardcore punk
- Occupation: Musician
- Instrument: Drums
- Years active: 2005–present
- Member of: Portraits of an Apparition; Fuming Mouth
- Formerly of: Slipknot; Hesitation Wounds; Madball; Against Me!; Bleed the Pigs; Suicidal Tendencies

Jay Bradley Weinberg (born September 8, 1990) is an American musician, best known as the former drummer of Slipknot. He is the son of longtime Bruce Springsteen drummer Max Weinberg. He played with the punk rock band the Reveling and toured in 2009 as a drummer with Bruce Springsteen's E Street Band, substituting for his father. During 2010, he was briefly the drummer for Madball. During 2011 and 2012, Weinberg played with Against Me!. In 2014, Weinberg replaced Joey Jordison as the drummer for Slipknot, and stayed with the band until his firing in November 2023. In 2024, Weinberg was announced as the new drummer for Infectious Grooves, replacing Brooks Wackerman. He then joined Suicidal Tendencies, before leaving the band in early 2026.

== Early life and education ==
Weinberg is the son of drummer Max Weinberg, the drummer of the E Street Band since 1975; his mother, Rebecca "Becky" (Schick), was a former teacher. He grew up in Middletown Township, New Jersey. His mother was a Methodist and his father Jewish. His sister is Ali Weinberg Rogin (married to Josh Rogin). As a child, he played travel team ice hockey as a goaltender. At age 9, he first saw the E Street Band on their 1999–2000 Reunion Tour, and saw shows on this and subsequent tours, especially in Europe. Around the same time his father took him to Ozzfest to see Slipknot, which gave him a strong affinity for heavy metal and other intense music genres; his father also exposed him to a wide variety of other music. He began playing guitar at age 9, and started playing bass at age 12 or 13. He then started playing drums at age 14, getting only few lessons from his father without much instruction and being mostly self-taught, using his father's old gear. By the next year he had performed a guest appearance on stage with band The Used and subsequently with punk rockers the Bouncing Souls. He played in the New Jersey metal band Chaosis. He attended Rumson-Fair Haven Regional High School where he played on the hockey team for a time, played in a band called Sadie Mae, and graduated in 2008.

Weinberg graduated from Stevens Institute of Technology in New Jersey in 2014. He joined the New York punk band the Reveling in August 2008, which plays before small audiences in venues such as the Ace of Clubs nightspot in Manhattan, various spots in Brooklyn, and elsewhere. With them he does some of the band's songwriting and arranging.

== Career ==
=== The E-Street Band (2008–2009) ===
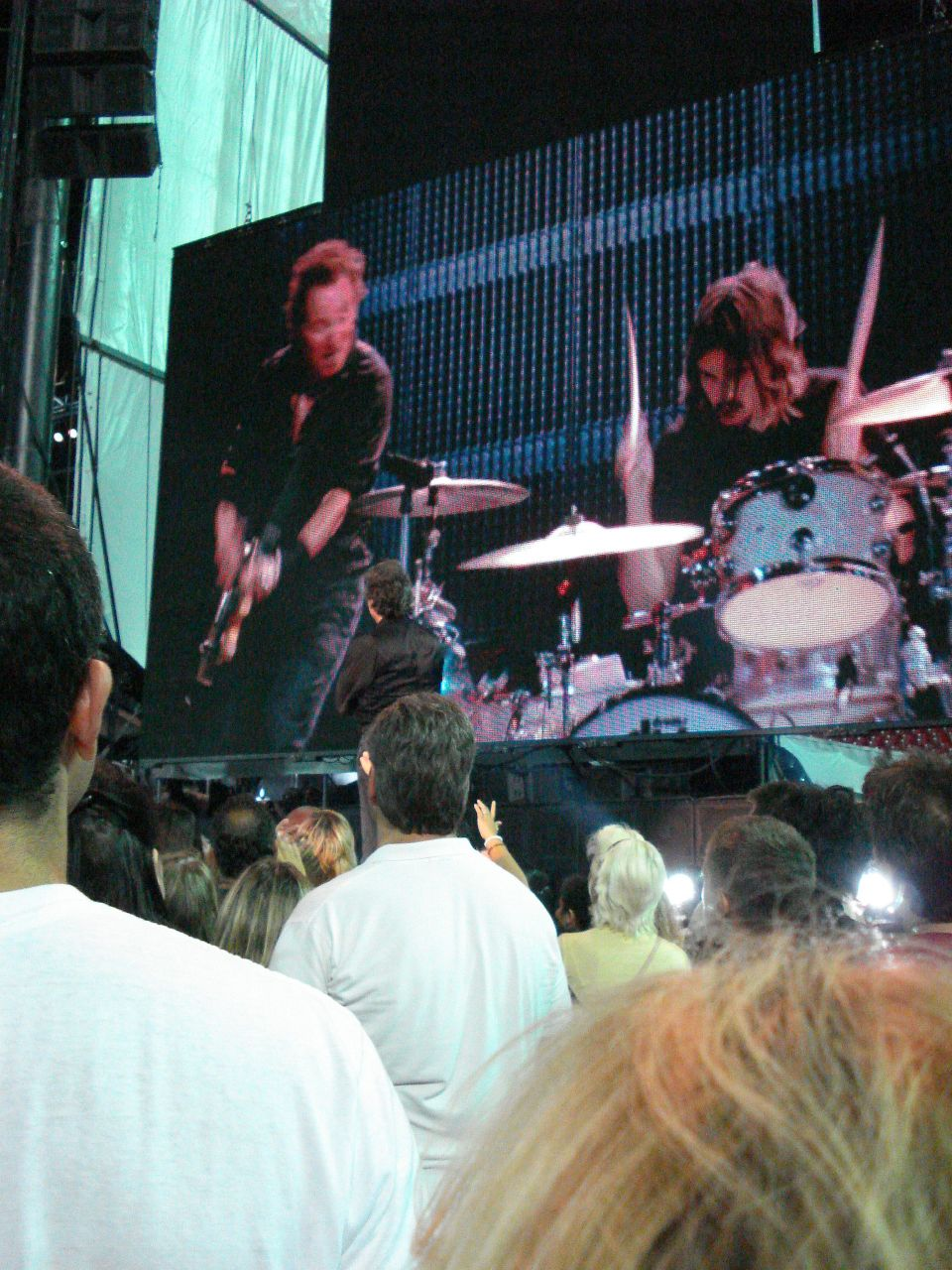
Max Weinberg (standing in front of stage, in black shirt) watches son Jay on the video screen, during "Born to Run" at Giants Stadium in 2008

Jay Weinberg's first appearance with Springsteen was in the summer of 2008, filling in for his father on "Born to Run" at Giants Stadium after having watched many other performances during the Magic Tour. Springsteen's 2009 Working on a Dream Tour posed a problem for Max Weinberg, as The Tonight Show with Conan O'Brien in Los Angeles - for which he was the Max Weinberg 7 bandleader - was starting at the same time that the tour would be in progress. Springsteen's manager Jon Landau viewed Weinberg as the "secret weapon" to substitute for his father without losing fan satisfaction. Both Landau and E Street guitarist Steve Van Zandt attributed Jay Weinberg's skills to a genetic gift.

Once the initial portion of the tour began in early April 2009, Weinberg played from several songs to half the show on most of the dates. He received a very positive reaction from both audiences and reviewers as a re-energizing "spark plug" for the much-older band, with his vigorous, long-hair-flying style inviting comparisons to Dave Grohl and his potential for replacing his father drawing allusions to Wally Pipp. He began playing complete shows in mid-May 2009 during the tour's American first leg, as his father went to California to prepare test runs for The Tonight Show start. Modern Drummer magazine's editor said that a college freshman playing on one of the year's biggest rock tours is "certainly a unique story". Weinberg played a number of dates early on in the European second leg of the tour, including at the Dutch Pinkpop festival in Landgraaf, Netherlands in addition to Bonnaroo in Manchester, Tennessee. He also played during a few dates of the American third and final leg. When not needed for the Springsteen tour, he continued to play for the Reveling, often before audiences that were three orders of magnitude smaller; he said of the difference, "I liked the duality of it all ... I like doing this just as much as I like doing that."

On June 22, 2024, Weinberg made a surprise-appearance on drums for the song "Radio Nowhere" at Springsteen and the E Street Band's show in Barcelona, Spain during their 2023–2024 tour.

=== Madball (2010) ===
In February 2010, Weinberg began playing with Madball, a hardcore band based out of New York City. In June of that year, it was announced that he would become the drummer for their upcoming album Empire and a tour. However, in September 2010 the group discharged him, with Madball vocalist Freddy Cricien saying, "I'm letting Jay go [mid-tour] in Canada because I just feel he doesn't represent this band well on a character-level". In response, Weinberg said that he had already quit the group by that time, and that "while I really enjoyed playing the music, I do not subscribe to their choice of habits and lifestyle. This past August while on tour in Europe, disturbing events within the band indicated to me that it was time for me to move on". In any case, Weinberg said both he and the group should be proud of Empire.

=== Against Me! (2010–2012) ===
In November 2010, it was announced that Weinberg would be playing drums with punk rock band Against Me! for their upcoming 2011 shows, covering for regular drummer George Rebelo while he toured with his other band, Hot Water Music. As 2011 unfolded, the arrangement looked to possibly be more permanent. Weinberg also sat in a bit with the band Fences during 2011. In late 2011, Against Me! began recording their first album with Weinberg on drums. However, in December 2012, Weinberg announced via Twitter, without notifying the other members beforehand, that he was leaving Against Me!. Via Twitter, he wished the band well, to which the other three members responded with a picture of a drum machine.

=== Slipknot (2014–2023) ===
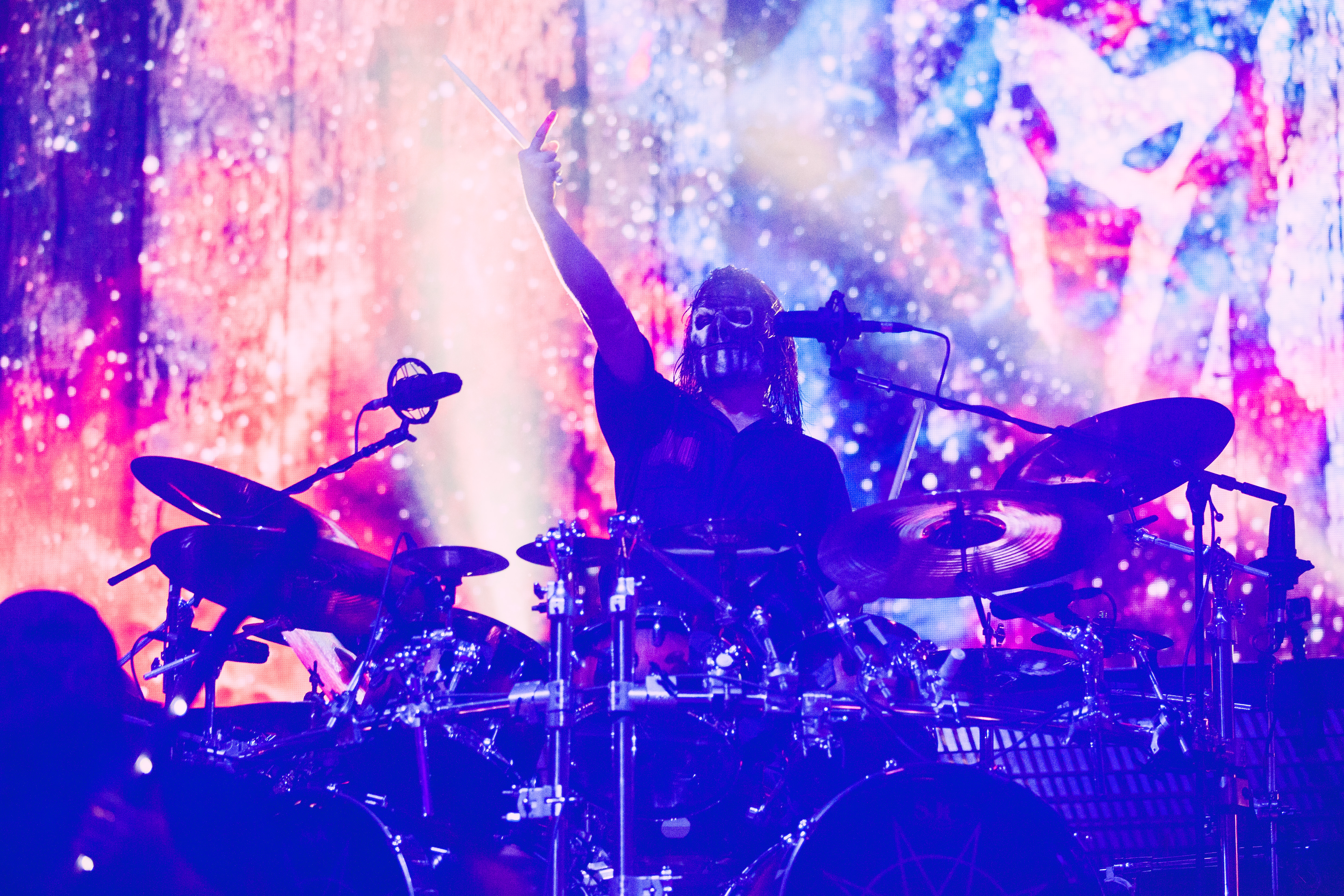
Weinberg performing with Slipknot in 2016

In 2014, Weinberg became the drummer for Slipknot following the departure of Joey Jordison in late 2013. Although the drummer's identity had not been officially revealed by the band itself, preferring to keep the identity of the new members (a new bassist, confirmed to be Alessandro Venturella, had also joined the band) a secret as they were not official members at that time. Weinberg had been a fan of the band from a young age, and it had given him motive and "a lot to prove" to his bandmates. A former drum technician for the band leaked their itinerary, revealing the drummer to be Weinberg. Venturella was also named on the itinerary, though fans had identified him earlier via his distinctive hand-tattoos. Weinberg was eventually officially revealed to be the drummer by Jim Root in an interview with Ultimate Guitar on May 13, 2015.

On November 5, 2023, Slipknot posted on Instagram that they would "part ways" with Weinberg as part of a "creative decision". Weinberg later said he was "blindsided" and "heartbroken" over being fired. Weinberg was replaced in 2024 by Sepultura drummer Eloy Casagrande.

=== Infectious Groove, Suicidal Tendencies, Fuming Mouth (2024–2026) ===
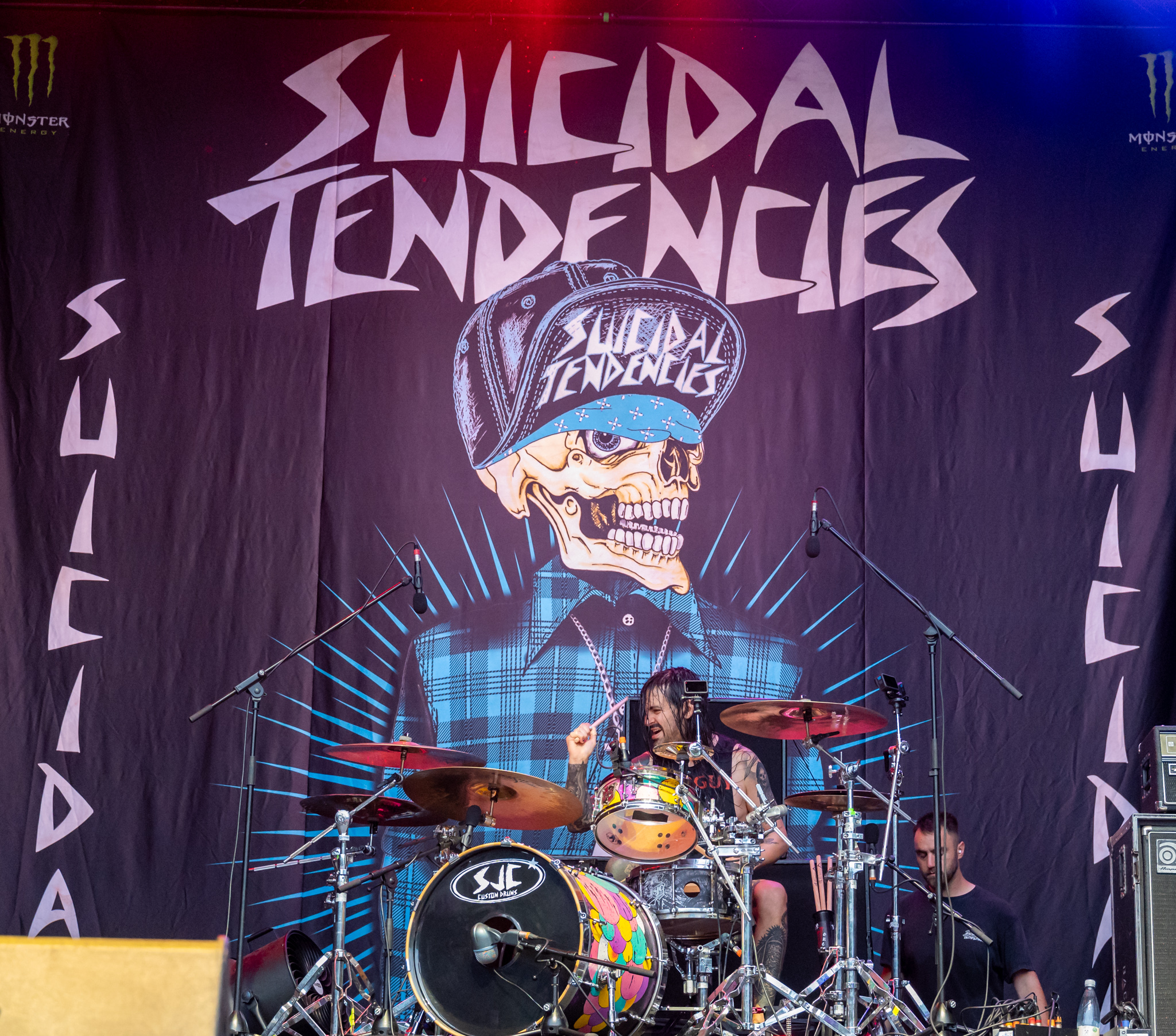
Weinberg with Suicidal Tendencies in 2024

In January 2024, Weinberg joined supergroup Infectious Grooves, replacing Brooks Wackerman. On March 23, 2024, Weinberg played his first show with the band. Weinberg was recruited by Infectious Grooves for the band's first live appearances since a one-off show in 2019 due to Wackerman's commitments to Avenged Sevenfold. After Weinberg's arrival, the band entered the studio to record a new song. The track, which was co-written by former guitarist Adam Siegel, marked the band's first release with Weinberg.

In March 2024, Weinberg joined Suicidal Tendencies replacing Greyson Nekrutman, who joined Sepultura after the departure of Eloy Casagrande. Weinberg announced his departure from Suicidal Tendencies in early 2026 after nearly 18 months of touring.

=== Fuming Mouth (2026–present) ===
On June 5, 2026, it was announced that Weinberg had joined the Massachusetts death metal and metallic hardcore band Fuming Mouth as their new drummer.

On July 17, 2026, the band released their third studio album, The Ringing Bell, marking Weinberg's first recording with the group.

== Discography ==
=== with The Reveling ===
- The Reveling (2008)
- 3D Radio (2009) (EP)

=== with Madball ===
- Empire (2010)

=== with Against Me! ===
- "Russian Spies / Occult Enemies" (2011) (non-album single)

=== with Hesitation Wounds ===
- Hesitation Wounds (2013) (EP)
- Awake For Everything (2016)

=== with Slipknot ===
- .5: The Gray Chapter (2014)
- Day of the Gusano (2017) (live album)
- "All Out Life" (2018) (single, bonus track on Japanese edition of WANYK)
- We Are Not Your Kind (2019)
- The End, So Far (2022)
- Adderall (EP) (2023)

== Equipment ==
Jay Weinberg currently endorses Ludwig Drums, Zildjian Cymbals, Evans Drumheads, DW Hardware, Roland, and Vater drumsticks.

Preceded by Joey Jordison	Slipknot drummer 2014–2023
