= Slipknot discography =

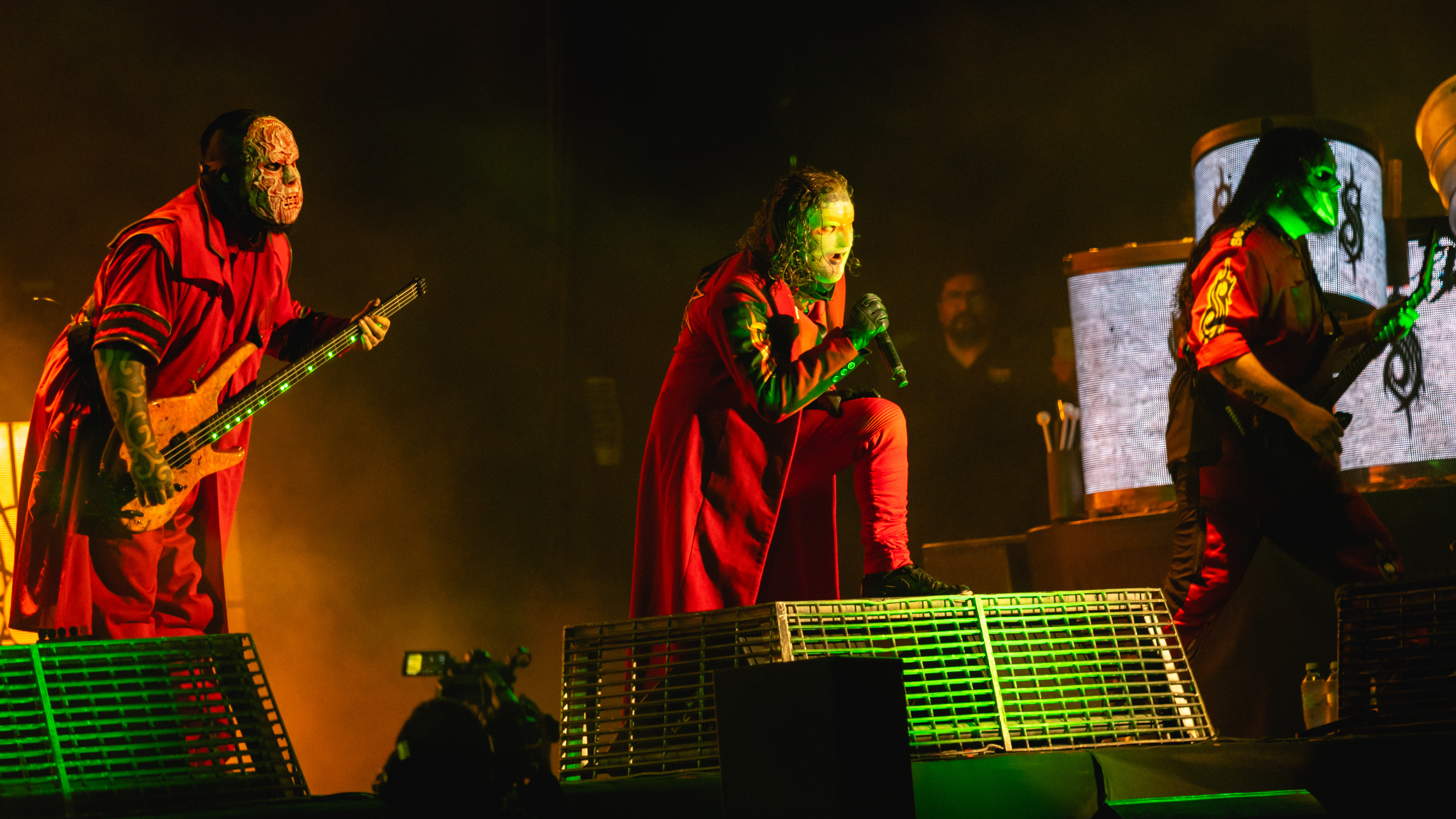
- Slipknot performing live in 2019
- Studio albums: 7
- Extended plays: 1
- Demo albums: 1
- Live albums: 3
- Compilation albums: 2
- Singles: 29
- Video albums: 5
- Music videos: 33

The American heavy metal band Slipknot has released seven studio albums, three live albums, two compilation albums, one demo album, one EP, 28 singles, five video albums and 33 music videos. Formed in Des Moines, Iowa in 1995, Slipknot originally featured vocalist and percussionist Anders Colsefni, guitarists Donnie Steele and Josh "Gnar" Brainard, bassist Paul Gray, drummer Joey Jordison, and percussionist and backing vocalist Shawn "Clown" Crahan. The original lineup released its first album Mate. Feed. Kill. Repeat. in 1996, before undergoing a number of lineup changes over the next few years.

Finalising its lineup as a nine-piece consisting of Corey Taylor (vocals), Mick Thomson, Jim Root (both guitars), Paul Gray (bass), Joey Jordison (drums), Shawn "Clown" Crahan, Chris Fehn (both percussion), Sid Wilson (turntables) and Craig Jones (samples), Slipknot signed with Roadrunner Records and released its self-titled debut album in June 1999. Slipknot reached number 51 on the US Billboard 200, and has since been certified double platinum by the Recording Industry Association of America (RIAA). The band followed this up in 2001 with Iowa, which reached number 3 on the Billboard 200 and topped the UK Albums Chart. Slipknot also released its first two videos during this period – Welcome to Our Neighborhood, a collection of music videos and live footage, in 1999, and Disasterpieces, a live concert recorded in London, in 2002.

After a short hiatus, Slipknot returned in 2004 with its third studio album Vol. 3: (The Subliminal Verses), which reached number 2 on the Billboard 200. The album was supported by a successful lead single in "Duality", which reached the top 10 of both the US Billboard Alternative Songs and Mainstream Rock charts. Later singles "Vermilion" and "Before I Forget" also registered on both charts. The band's first live album, 9.0: Live, followed the next year and reached the top 20 of the Billboard 200. Third video album Voliminal: Inside the Nine was released in December 2006. 2008's All Hope Is Gone, Slipknot's fourth studio album, was the band's first to top the Billboard 200, as well as several album charts in other regions. "Psychosocial", "Dead Memories" and "Snuff" all reached the Billboard Alternative Songs top 20.

On May 24, 2010, founding member Paul Gray died of an "accidental overdose of morphine and fentanyl" and in September 2010 the band dedicated its fourth video album (sic)nesses to the deceased bassist, which documented their performance at Download Festival in 2009. The release topped the Music Video charts in the US and the UK. A compilation album, Antennas to Hell, followed in 2012. After returning to touring in 2011 with former guitarist Donnie Steele on bass, Slipknot also parted ways with Joey Jordison in 2013 in controversial circumstances. The group resurfaced in 2014 with Alessandro Venturella on bass and Jay Weinberg on drums, releasing the Gray-dedicated .5: The Gray Chapter in October that year, which followed All Hope Is Gone in topping the Billboard 200.

The band fired longtime percussionist Chris Fehn after he sued the band for withholding payments from him prior to the release of the band's sixth studio album We Are Not Your Kind on August 9, 2019. We Are Not Your Kind was the band's third consecutive number one album on the US Billboard 200 and was the band's first UK number 1 on the UK Albums Chart in 18 years, since the release of Iowa. They subsequently replaced Fehn with Michael Pfaff for all future tour dates and recorded his first album with the band for their seventh studio album The End, So Far which was released on September 30, 2022 and their last to be released via Roadrunner Records.

As of 2019, Slipknot has sold 30 million units of records worldwide.

== Albums ==
=== Studio albums ===
List of studio albums, with selected chart positions and certifications
Title	Album details	Peak chart positions										Sales	Certifications
Title	Album details	US	AUS	AUT	CAN	FIN	GER	JPN	NZ	SWE	UK	Sales	Certifications
Slipknot	Released: June 29, 1999; Label: Roadrunner; Formats: CD, LP, CS	51	32	—	—	30	8	35	49	53	37	US: 2,000,000+; UK: 413,978	RIAA: 3× Platinum; ARIA: Platinum; BPI: Platinum; MC: 2× Platinum; RIAJ: Gold; RMNZ: Gold
Iowa	Released: August 28, 2001; Label: Roadrunner; Formats: CD, 2×LP, CS	3	2	8	1	3	4	4	5	10	1	US: 1,170,000; UK: 316,758	RIAA: Platinum; ARIA: Gold; BPI: Platinum; BVMI: Gold; MC: Platinum; RIAJ: Gold; RMNZ: Gold
Vol. 3: (The Subliminal Verses)	Released: May 25, 2004; Label: Roadrunner; Formats: CD, 2×LP, CS, CD+DVD	2	2	5	2	2	2	2	3	2	5	US: 1,453,000	RIAA: Platinum; ARIA: Platinum; BPI: Platinum; BVMI: Gold; MC: 2× Platinum; RIAJ: Gold; RMNZ: Platinum
All Hope Is Gone	Released: August 26, 2008; Label: Roadrunner; Formats: CD, CD+DVD, 2×LP, DL	1	1	2	1	1	2	2	1	1	2	US: 1,106,000	RIAA: Platinum; ARIA: Gold; BPI: Platinum; BVMI: Gold; IFPI AUT: Gold; MC: 2× Platinum; RIAJ: Gold; RMNZ: Platinum
.5: The Gray Chapter	Released: October 21, 2014; Label: Roadrunner; Formats: CD, 2×CD, 2×LP, DL	1	1	2	1	4	2	1	2	3	2		RIAA: Gold; ARIA: Gold; BPI: Gold; BVMI: Gold; IFPI AUT: Platinum; MC: Platinum; RMNZ: Gold
We Are Not Your Kind	Released: August 9, 2019; Label: Roadrunner; Formats: CD, 2×LP, DL	1	1	3	1	1	2	9	2	4	1	US: 503,000; UK: 39,124	BPI: Gold; IFPI AUT: Gold; MC: Gold; RMNZ: Gold
The End, So Far	Released: September 30, 2022; Label: Roadrunner; Formats: CD, 2×LP, CS, DL	2	1	4	2	2	1	11	2	2	1	JPN: 5,056; UK: 16,142	
"—" denotes a release that did not chart or was not issued in that region.

=== Live albums ===
List of live albums, with selected chart positions and certifications
Title	Album details	Peak chart positions										Certifications
Title	Album details	US	AUS	AUT	FRA	GER	IRL	JPN	SWE	SWI	UK	Certifications
9.0: Live	Released: November 1, 2005; Label: Roadrunner; Formats: 2×CD	17	26	18	41	24	56	23	40	43	53	RIAA: Gold
Day of the Gusano: Live in Mexico	Released: October 20, 2017; Label: Eagle Vision; Formats: 2×CD, 3×LP, DL	—	—	—	—	25	—	—	—	—	—	
Live at MSG	Released: August 18, 2023; Label: Roadrunner; Formats: 2×LP	— (Note: Live at MSG did not enter the US Billboard 200, but peaked at number 77 on the US Top Album Sales chart.)	—	—	—	—	—	—	—	—	— (Note: Live at MSG did not enter the UK Albums Chart, but peaked at number 19 on the UK Rock & Metal Albums Chart.)	
"—" denotes a release that did not chart or was not issued in that region.

=== Compilation albums ===
List of compilation albums, with selected chart positions and certifications
Title	Album details	Peak chart positions										Certifications
Title	Album details	US	AUS	AUT	CAN	FIN	GER	JPN	NZ	SWE	UK	Certifications
Antennas to Hell	Released: July 24, 2012; Label: Roadrunner; Formats: CD, CD+DVD	18	16	10	22	13	10	10	22	13	22	BPI: Platinum; RMNZ: Gold
The Studio Album Collection (1999 - 2008)	Released: October 17, 2014; Label: Roadrunner; Formats: DL	–	–	–	–	–	–	–	–	–	–	
"—" denotes a release that did not chart or was not issued in that region.

=== Demo albums ===
List of demo albums
Title	Album details
Mate. Feed. Kill. Repeat.	Released: October 31, 1996; Label: Pale One Records (Note: Mate. Feed. Kill. Repeat. was later reissued by -ismist Recordings in 1997.); Formats: CD

== Extended plays ==
List of extended plays
Title	Album details
Adderall	Released: June 9, 2023; Label: Roadrunner; Formats: DL

== Singles ==
List of singles, with selected chart positions and certifications, showing year released and album name
Title	Year	Peak chart positions										Certifications	Album
Title	Year	US Bub.	US Rock	US Main.	AUS	GER	NLD	NZ	SWE	UK	UK Rock	Certifications	Album
"Wait and Bleed"	1999	—	—	34	46	—	52	—	—	27	1	RIAA: Platinum; BPI: Platinum; MC: 2× Platinum; RMNZ: Platinum	Slipknot
"Spit It Out"	2000	—	—	—	99	—	—	—	—	28	1	BPI: Silver; MC: Gold	Slipknot
"Left Behind"	2001	—	—	30	97	—	—	—	—	24	5	BPI: Silver; MC: Gold	Iowa
"My Plague"	2002	—	—	—	—	—	—	—	—	43	—		Iowa
"Duality"	2004	6	—	5	—	28	63	—	35	15	1	BPI: 2× Platinum; BVMI: Gold; MC: 3× Platinum; RMNZ: 3× Platinum	Vol. 3: (The Subliminal Verses)
"Vermilion"	2004	—	—	14	—	74	—	—	—	31	2	RMNZ: Gold	Vol. 3: (The Subliminal Verses)
"Before I Forget"	2005	—	—	11	—	—	—	—	—	35	3	RIAA: Platinum; BPI: Platinum; MC: 3× Platinum; RMNZ: Platinum	Vol. 3: (The Subliminal Verses)
"The Nameless"	2005	—	—	—	—	—	—	—	—	—	—		9.0: Live
"The Blister Exists"	2006	—	—	—	—	—	—	—	—	—	—		Vol. 3: (The Subliminal Verses)
"All Hope Is Gone"	2008	—	—	—	—	—	—	—	42	98	—		All Hope Is Gone
"Psychosocial"	2008	2	—	7	84	31	—	35	28	67	17	BPI: Platinum; MC: 3× Platinum; RMNZ: 2× Platinum	All Hope Is Gone
"Dead Memories"	2008	—	25	3	—	—	—	—	—	—	37		All Hope Is Gone
"Sulfur"	2009	—	—	18	—	—	—	—	—	—	—		All Hope Is Gone
"Snuff"	2009	10	6	2	—	—	—	—	—	—	—	RIAA: Platinum; BPI: Silver; MC: Platinum; RMNZ: Platinum	All Hope Is Gone
"The Negative One"	2014	—	21	33	76	—	—	—	—	71	1		.5: The Gray Chapter
"The Devil in I"	2014	23	12	2	88	—	—	—	—	135	2	RIAA: Gold; BPI: Gold; MC: 2× Platinum; RMNZ: Platinum	.5: The Gray Chapter
"Custer"	2014	—	—	28	—	—	—	—	—	—	—	BPI: Silver; MC: Platinum; RMNZ: Gold	.5: The Gray Chapter
"Killpop"	2015	—	31	10	—	—	—	—	—	—	28		.5: The Gray Chapter
"Goodbye"	2016	—	—	22	—	—	—	—	—	—	—		.5: The Gray Chapter
"All Out Life"	2018	— (Note: "All Out Life" did not enter the US Bubbling Under Hot 100 chart, but peaked at number 29 on the Digital Song Sales chart.)	15	17	—	—	—	— (Note: "All Out Life" did not enter the NZ Top 40 Singles Chart, but peaked at number 26 on the NZ Hot Singles Chart.)	— (Note: "All Out Life" did not enter the Swedish Singellista Chart, but peaked at number 12 on the Swedish Heatseeker Chart.)	99	7		We Are Not Your Kind (Japanese edition)
"Unsainted"	2019	20	4	10	86	—	—	— (Note: "Unsainted" did not enter the NZ Top 40 Singles Chart, but peaked at number 17 on the NZ Hot Singles Chart.)	— (Note: "Unsainted" did not enter the Swedish Singellista Chart, but peaked at number 14 on the Swedish Heatseeker Chart.)	68	2	RIAA: Gold; BPI: Silver; MC: Platinum; RMNZ: Gold	We Are Not Your Kind
"Solway Firth"	2019	— (Note: "Solway Firth" did not enter the US Bubbling Under Hot 100 chart, but peaked at number 45 on the Digital Song Sales chart.)	8	—	—	—	—	—	—	— (Note: "Solway Firth" did not enter the UK Singles Chart, but peaked at number 61 on the UK Singles Sales Chart.)	14		We Are Not Your Kind
"Birth of the Cruel"	2019	—	14	—	—	—	—	—	—	—	9		We Are Not Your Kind
"Nero Forte"	2019	—	11	18	—	—	—	— (Note: "Nero Forte" did not enter the NZ Top 40 Singles Chart, but peaked at number 16 on the NZ Hot Singles Chart.)	—	84	4	BPI: Silver; MC: Gold	We Are Not Your Kind
"The Chapeltown Rag"	2021	— (Note: "The Chapeltown Rag" did not enter the US Bubbling Under Hot 100 chart, but peaked at number 19 on the Digital Song Sales chart.)	19	28	— (Note: "The Chapeltwon Rag" did not enter the ARIA Singles Chart, but peaked at number 23 on the ARIA Digital Track Chart.)	—	—	—	—	— (Note: "The Chapeltown Rag" did not enter the UK Singles Chart, but peaked at number 33 on the UK Singles Sales Chart.)	13		The End, So Far
"The Dying Song (Time to Sing)"	2022	—	27	—	—	—	—	—	—	— (Note: "The Dying Song (Time to Sing)" did not enter the UK Singles Chart, but peaked at number 71 on the UK Singles Sales Chart.)	24		The End, So Far
"Yen"	2022	—	37	16	—	—	—	—	—	— (Note: "Yen" did not enter the UK Singles Chart or the UK Singles Sales Chart, but peaked at number 100 on the UK Singles Downloads Chart.)	—		The End, So Far
"Bone Church"	2023	—	— (Note: "Bone Church" did not enter the US Hot Rock & Alternative Songs Chart, but peaked at number 15 on the US Hot Hard Rock Songs chart.)	—	—	—	—	—	—	—	—		Non-album singles
"Arsenal"	2026	—	— (Note: "Arsenal" did not enter the US Hot Rock & Alternative Songs Chart, but peaked at number 2 on the US Hot Hard Rock Songs chart.)	—	—	—	—	— (Note: "Arsenal" did not enter the NZ Top 40 Singles Chart, but peaked at number 38 on the NZ Hot Singles Chart.)	—	— (Note: "Arsenal" did not enter the UK Singles Chart, but peaked at number 82 on the UK Singles Sales Chart.)	—		Non-album singles
"—" denotes a release that did not chart or was not issued in that region.

=== Promotional singles ===
Song	Year	Peak chart positions	Certifications	Album
Song	Year	US Main. Rock	Certifications	Album
"Surfacing"	2000	—		Slipknot
"The Heretic Anthem"	2001	—		Iowa
"People = Shit"	2001	—	BPI: Silver; MC: Gold	Iowa
"Vermilion Pt. 2"	2004	—		Vol. 3: (The Subliminal Verses)
"Pulse of the Maggots"	2004	—		Vol. 3: (The Subliminal Verses)
"XIX"	2014	12		.5: The Gray Chapter
"Sarcastrophe"	2014	17		.5: The Gray Chapter
"AOV"	2014	27		.5: The Gray Chapter
"Skeptic"	2014	—		.5: The Gray Chapter
"Prosthetics" (Demo)	2025	—		Slipknot (25th Anniversary Edition)
"Me Inside" (Demo)	2025	—		Slipknot (25th Anniversary Edition)
"—" denotes a release that did not chart.

== Other charted and certified songs ==
List of other charted songs, with selected chart positions, showing year released and album name
Title	Year	Charts				Certifications	Album
Title	Year	US Main. Rock	US Rock	NZ Hot	UK Rock	Certifications	Album
"Eyeless"	1999	—	—	—	—	BPI: Silver; RMNZ: Gold	Slipknot
"The Nameless"	2005	25	—	—	—		Vol 3: (The Subliminal Verses)
"Insert Coin"	2019	—	39	—	20		We Are Not Your Kind
"Death Because of Death"	2019	—	40	—	18		We Are Not Your Kind
"Critical Darling"	2019	—	19	22	8		We Are Not Your Kind
"A Liar's Funeral"	2019	—	38	—	22		We Are Not Your Kind
"Red Flag"	2019	—	30	32	16		We Are Not Your Kind
"What's Next"	2019	—	—	—	33		We Are Not Your Kind
"Spiders"	2019	—	34	—	25		We Are Not Your Kind
"Orphan"	2019	—	28	—	23		We Are Not Your Kind
"My Pain"	2019	—	—	—	38		We Are Not Your Kind
"Not Long for This World"	2019	—	43	—	39		We Are Not Your Kind
"Adderall"	2022	—	—	31	35		The End, So Far
"Hive Mind"	2022	—	— (Note: "Hive Mind" did not enter the Hot Rock & Alternative Songs chart, but peaked at number 12 on the Hot Hard Rock Songs chart.)	36	26		The End, So Far
"Warranty"	2022	—	— (Note: "Warranty" did not enter the Hot Rock & Alternative Songs chart, but peaked at number 18 on the Hot Hard Rock Songs chart.)	—	—		The End, So Far
"H377"	2022	—	— (Note: "H377" did not enter the Hot Rock & Alternative Songs chart, but peaked at number 24 on the Hot Hard Rock Songs chart.)	—	—		The End, So Far
"—" denotes a release that did not register on that chart.

== Other appearances ==
List of other appearances, showing year released and album name
Title	Year	Album	Ref.
"Snap"	2003	Freddy vs. Jason	

== Videos ==
=== Video albums ===
List of video albums, with selected chart positions and certifications
Title	Album details	Charts						Certifications
Title	Album details	US	FIN	GER	JPN	NZ	UK	Certifications
Welcome to Our Neighborhood	Released: November 9, 1999; Label: Roadrunner (#0981); Formats: VHS	1	—	—	—	—	20	RIAA: Platinum; ARIA: 2× Platinum; BPI: Gold; MC: Gold
Disasterpieces	Released: November 25, 2002; Label: Roadrunner (#0967); Formats: 2×DVD, VHS	3	1	—	—	—	6	RIAA: 4× Platinum; BPI: Gold; BVMI: Gold; MC: 3× Platinum
Voliminal: Inside the Nine	Released: December 5, 2006; Label: Roadrunner (#0951); Formats: 2×DVD	5	—	84	47	—	21	RIAA: Platinum; ARIA: Platinum; MC: 2× Platinum
(sic)nesses	Released: September 28, 2010; Label: Roadrunner (#0918); Formats: 2×DVD	1	1	54	21	3	1	RIAA: Platinum; ARIA: Gold
Day of the Gusano: Live in Mexico	Released: October 20, 2017; Label: Eagle Vision; Formats: DVD, BD, DL	2	—	—	182	—	—	
"—" denotes a release that did not chart or was not issued in that region.

=== Music videos ===
List of music videos, showing year released and director(s)
Title	Year	Director(s)	Ref.
"Spit It Out"	1999	Thomas Mignone	
"Surfacing" (live)	1999	Thomas Mignone	
"Wait and Bleed"	1999	Thomas Mignone	
"Wait and Bleed" (animated)	2000	Marc Smerling	
"Left Behind"	2001	Dave Meyers	
"My Plague" (New Abuse mix)	2002	Matthew Amos, Simon Hilton	
"People = Shit" (live)	2002	Matthew Amos	
"The Heretic Anthem" (live)	2002	Matthew Amos	
"Scissors"	2003	Thomas Mignone	
"Duality"	2004	Tony Petrossian, Marc Klasfeld	
"Vermilion"	2004	Tony Petrossian, Shawn Crahan	
"Vermilion Pt. 2"	2004	Marc Klesfeld	
"Before I Forget"	2005	Tony Petrossian, Shawn Crahan	
"The Nameless" (live)	2005	Shawn Crahan	
"The Blister Exists"	2007	Shawn Crahan	
"Psychosocial"	2008	P. R. Brown	
"Dead Memories"	2008	P. R. Brown, Shawn Crahan	
"Sulfur"	2009	P. R. Brown, Shawn Crahan	
"Snuff"	2009	P. R. Brown, Shawn Crahan	
"Psychosocial" (live)	2012	Ruary Macphie	
"The Negative One"	2014	Shawn Crahan	
"The Devil in I"	2014	Shawn Crahan	
"The Devil in I" (live)	2014		
"Custer" (live)	2015		
"Killpop"	2015	Shawn Crahan	
"XIX"	2015	Shawn Crahan	
"The Shape" (live)	2017		
"All Out Life"	2018	Shawn Crahan	
"Unsainted"	2019	Shawn Crahan	
"Birth of the Cruel"	2019		
"Solway Firth"	2019	Shawn Crahan	
"Nero Forte"	2019	Shawn Crahan	
"The Chapeltown Rag" (live)	2021	Shawn Crahan	
"The Dying Song (Time To Sing)"	2022	Shawn Crahan	
"Yen"	2022	Shawn Crahan	
"Bone Church"	2023	Shawn Crahan	
"Memories (Adderall - Rough Demo)"	2023	Shawn Crahan	
"Death March"	2023	Shawn Crahan	
"Hive Mind"	2023	Shawn Crahan	
"Arsenal"	2026	Shawn Crahan	

== See also ==
- List of songs recorded by Slipknot
