= List of songs recorded by Slipknot =

Slipknot is an American heavy metal band from Des Moines, Iowa. The band was founded in 1995 by vocalist Anders Colsefni, guitarists Donnie Steele and Josh Brainard, bassist Paul Gray, drummer Joey Jordison and percussionist Shawn "Clown" Crahan, who released the group's first demo Mate. Feed. Kill. Repeat. in 1996. After its release, the band went through a number of lineup changes, replacing Colsefni with Corey Taylor, Steele with Mick Thomson and Brainard with Jim Root, as well as adding second percussionist Chris Fehn, turntablist Sid Wilson and sampler Craig "133" Jones. The nine-piece's official debut album, Slipknot, was produced by Ross Robinson and released by Roadrunner Records in 1999. Most of the songwriting was credited to all nine members except Root, who had joined the band late into the recording process.

The follow-up to Slipknot, entitled Iowa, was released in 2001 and credited all nine band members for songwriting. Many songs from Slipknot and Iowa were later included on the band's first video album, Disasterpieces, recorded in London, England and released in 2002. The band's third album, Vol. 3: (The Subliminal Verses), was produced by Rick Rubin and released in 2004; all songs were credited to the full band again. Slipknot's first live album, 9.0: Live, was released in 2005 and featured songs from the group's three studio albums. Fourth album All Hope Is Gone followed in 2008, which credited all nine members for songwriting and was produced by Dave Fortman.

Paul Gray died of an "accidental overdose of morphine and fentanyl" on May 24, 2010. The band dedicated the 2010 video album (sic)nesses to the bassist, which was recorded live at Download Festival in 2009. After Joey Jordison left the band in 2013, the band added Alessandro Venturella and Jay Weinberg on bass and drums, respectively. .5: The Gray Chapter was released in 2014 and featured songs primarily written by Corey Taylor and Jim Root, with some contributions from Shawn Crahan and Craig Jones.

== Released Songs ==
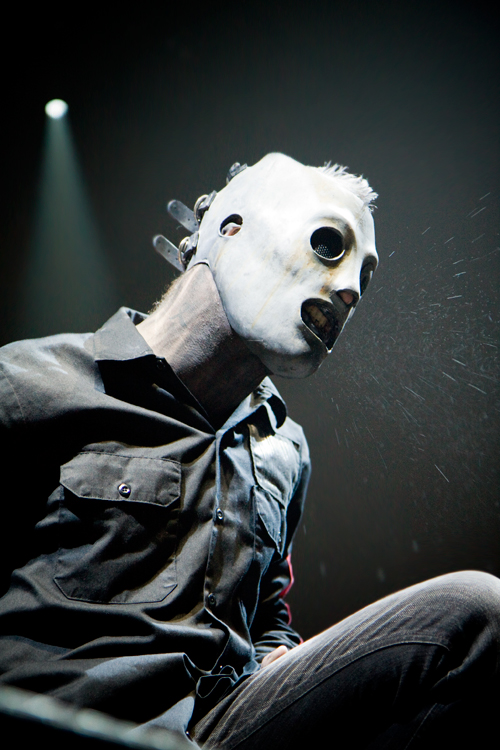
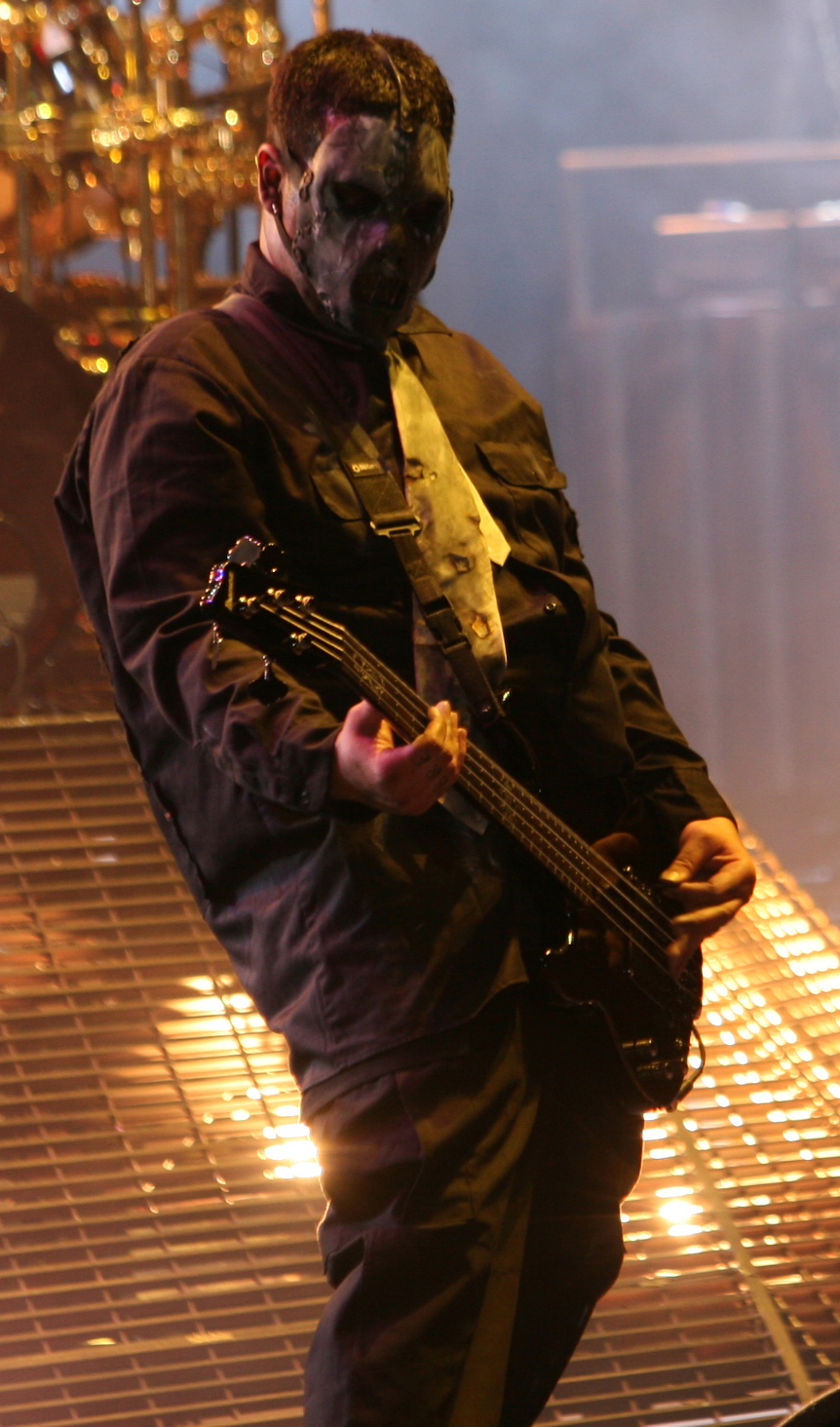
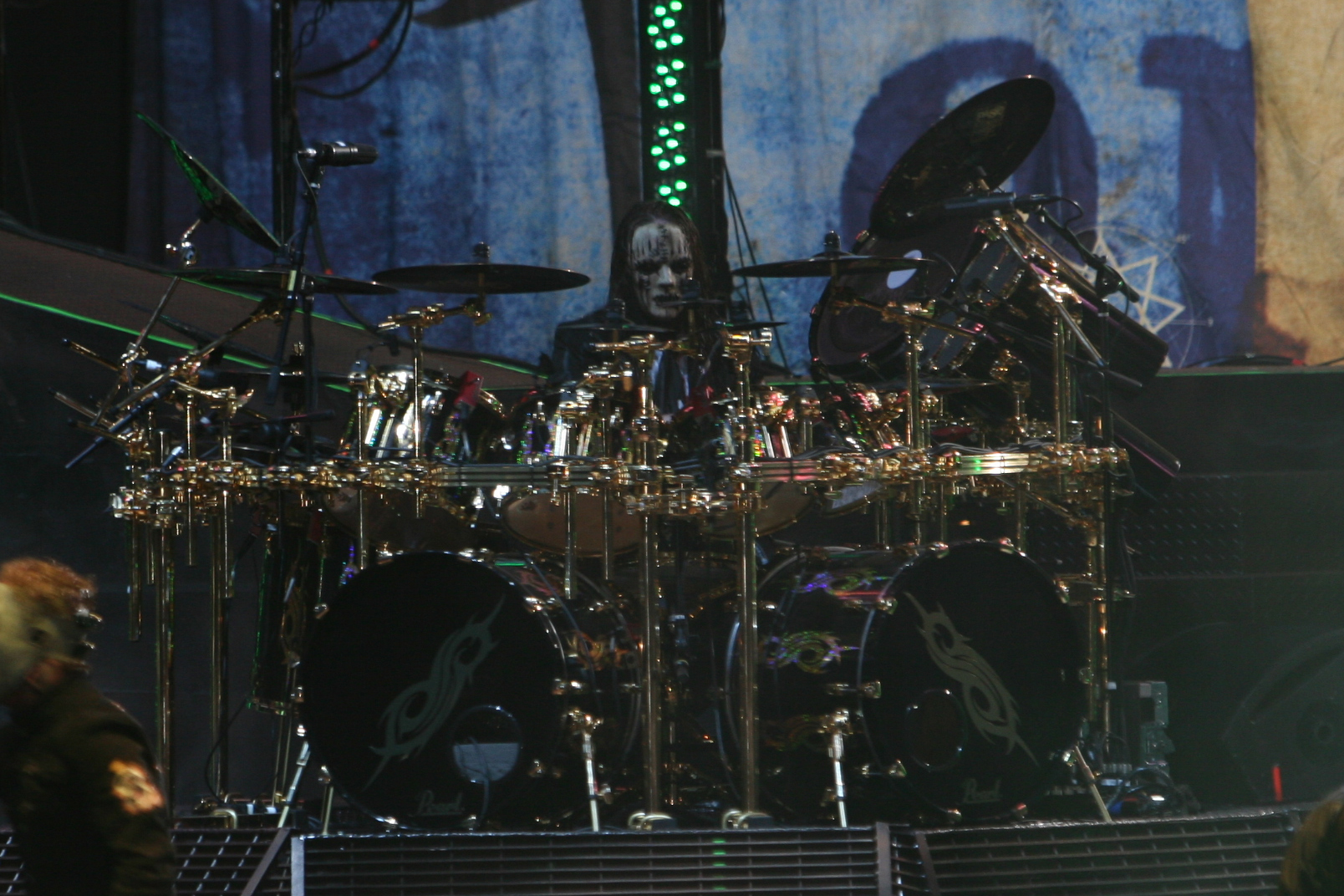
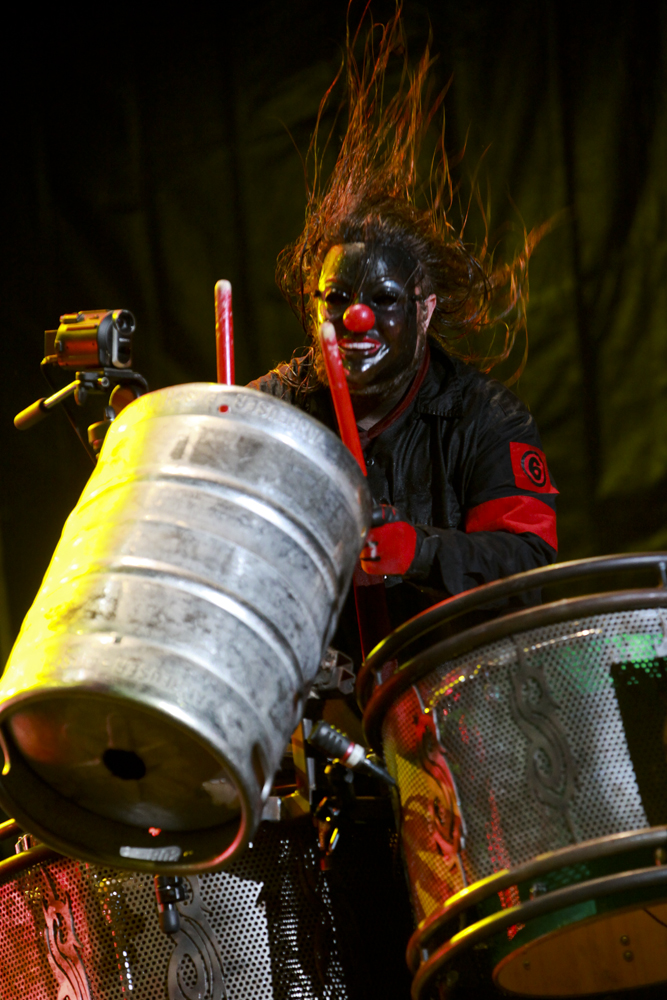
From 1997 to 2010, many of Slipknot's songs were written by the core group of vocalist Corey Taylor, bassist Paul Gray, drummer Joey Jordison and percussionist Shawn "Clown" Crahan.
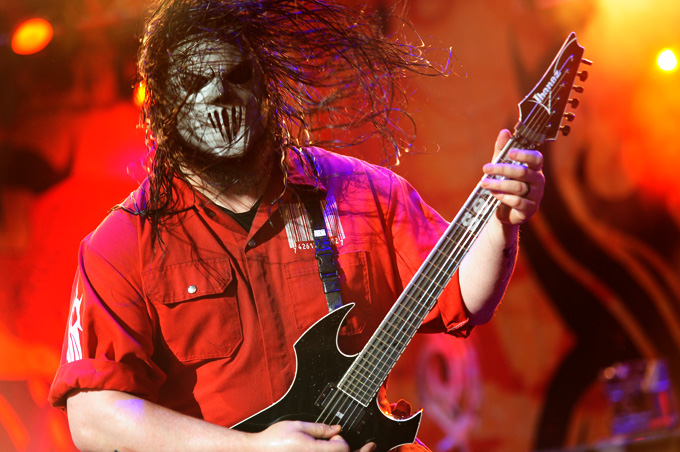
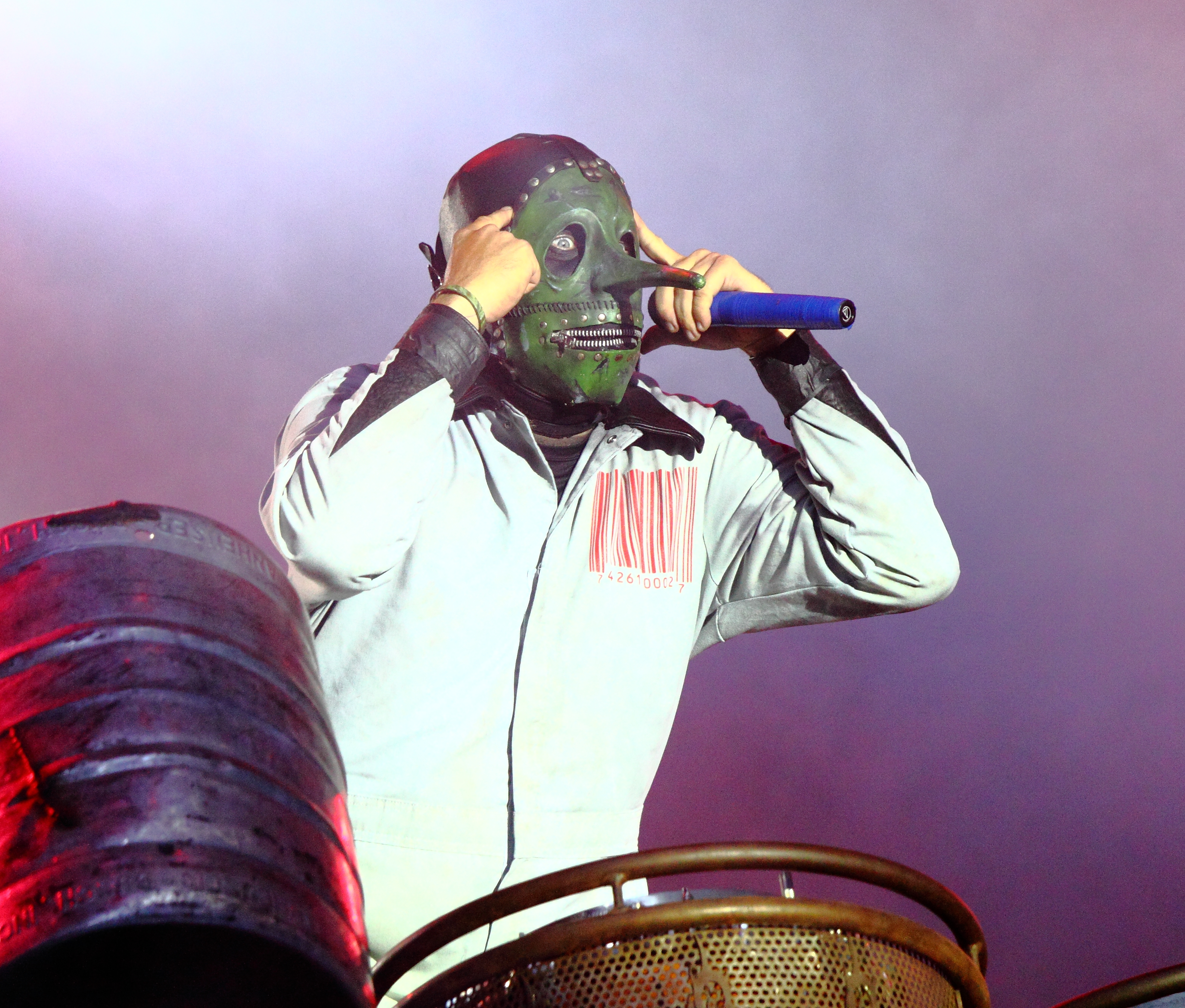
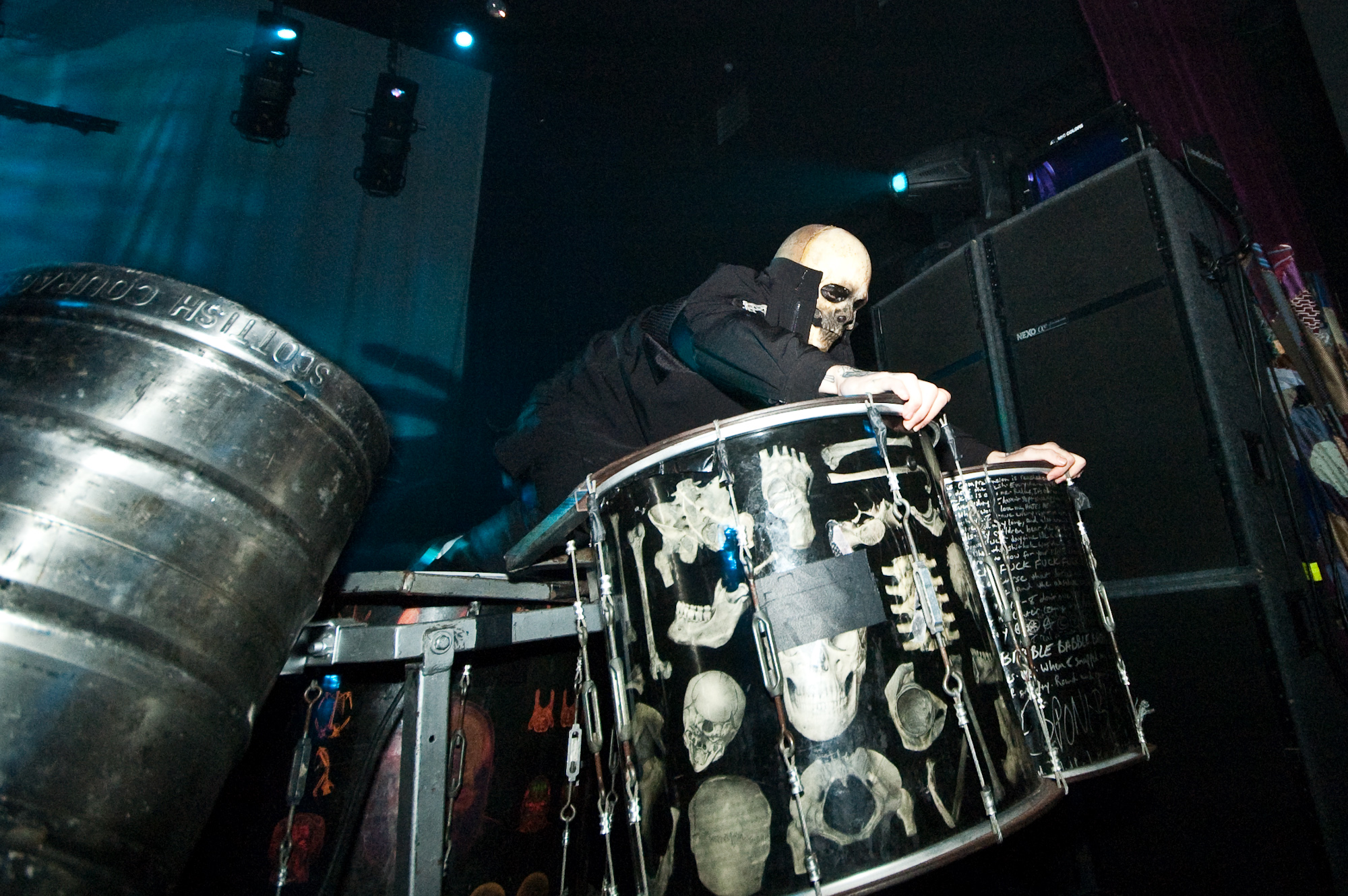
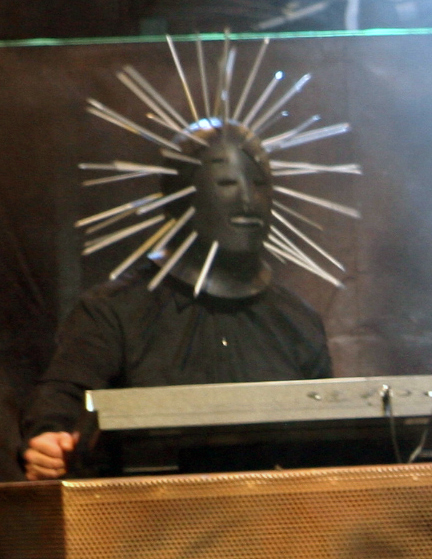
Guitarist Mick Thomson, percussionist Chris Fehn, turntablist Sid Wilson, and sampler/keyboardist Craig "133" Jones were also co-credited for songwriting on the band's first four albums.
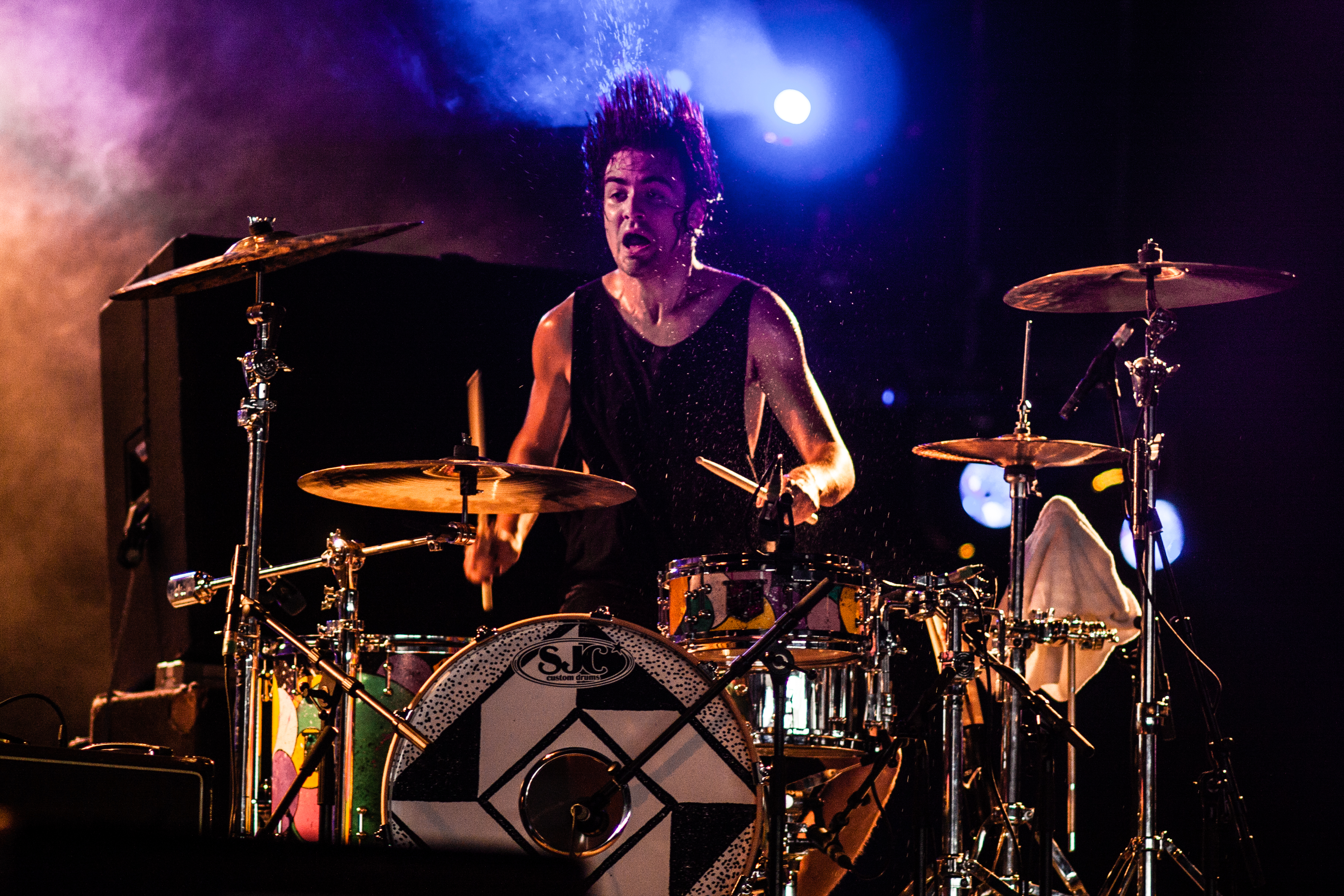
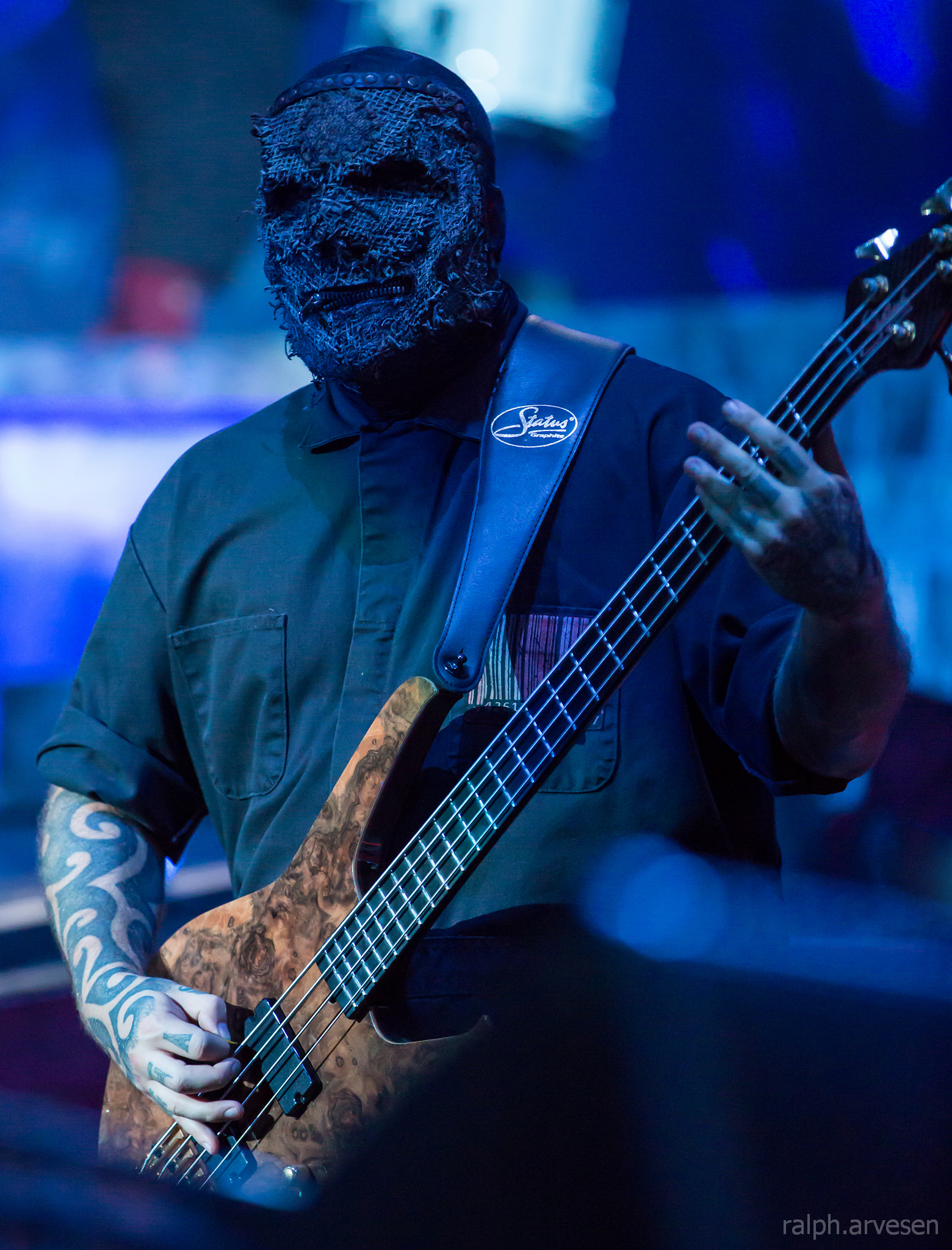
Jay Weinberg and Alessandro Venturella replaced Jordison and Gray on drums and bass respectively in 2013, first performing on 2014's .5: The Gray Chapter.
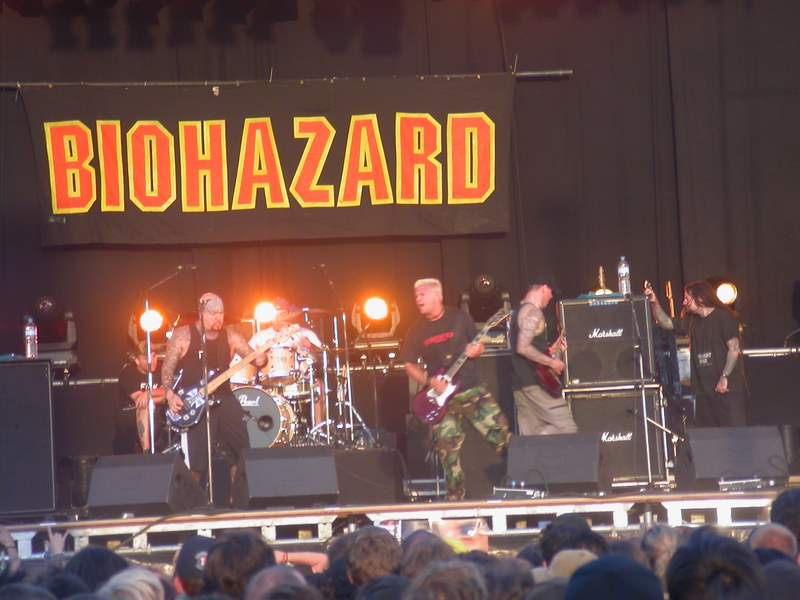
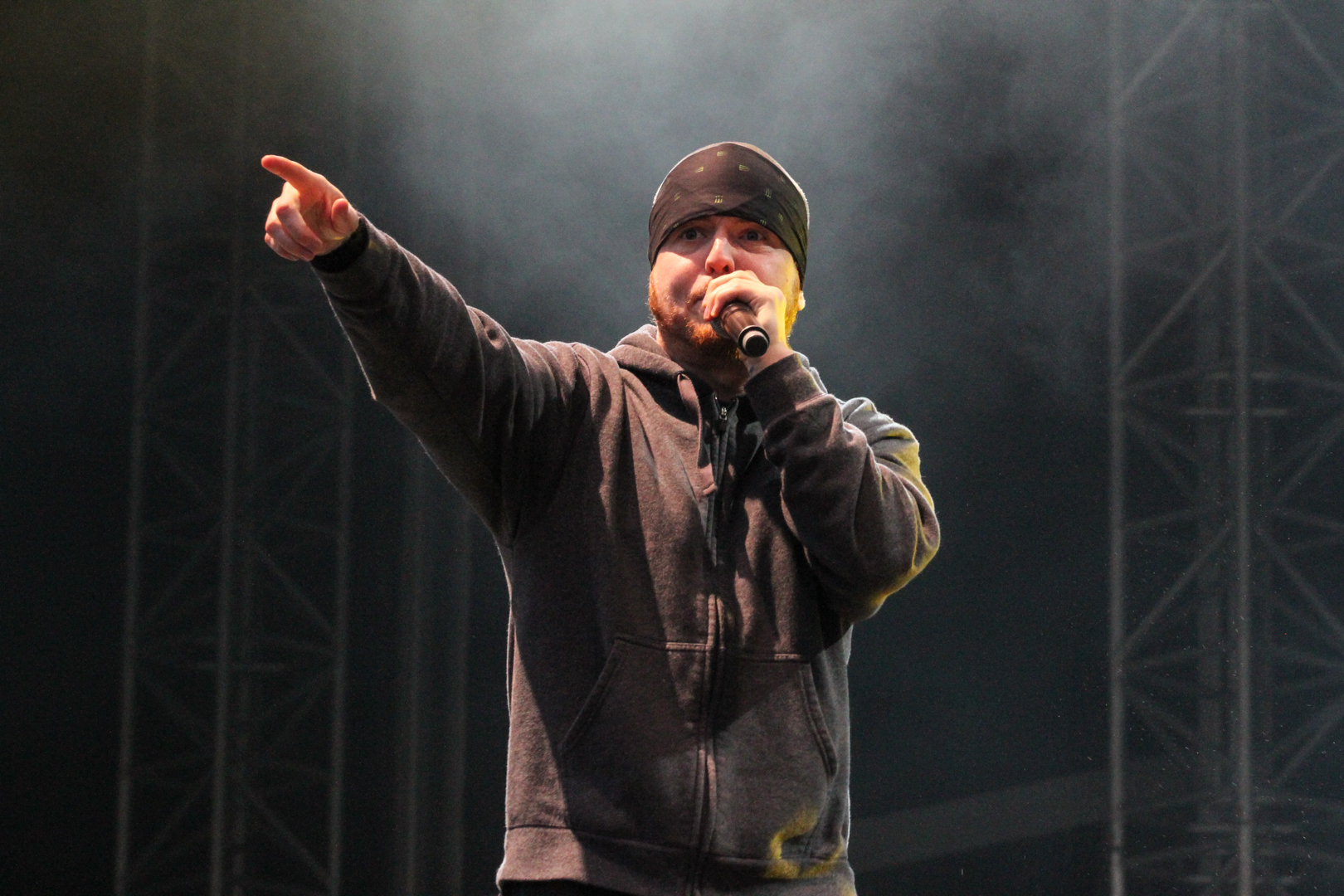
Slipknot is featured with Hatebreed frontman Jamey Jasta on hardcore punk band Biohazard's 2001 song "Domination", released on Uncivilization.

Key
†	Indicates song released as a single
‡	Indicates song written by the whole band

Title	Writer(s)	Release	Year	Ref.	Notes
"'Til We Die"	Corey Taylor; Mick Thomson; Jim Root; Paul Gray; Joey Jordison; Shawn Crahan; Chris Fehn; Sid Wilson; Craig Jones ‡	All Hope Is Gone	2008		(Note: "'Til We Die" and "Child of Burning Time" were released as bonus tracks on special editions of All Hope Is Gone.)
"(515)"	Corey Taylor; Mick Thomson; Jim Root; Paul Gray; Joey Jordison; Shawn Crahan; Chris Fehn; Sid Wilson; Craig Jones ‡	Iowa	2001		
"(sic)"	Corey Taylor; Mick Thomson; Paul Gray; Joey Jordison; Shawn Crahan; Chris Fehn; Sid Wilson; Craig Jones	Slipknot	1999		
".execute."	Corey Taylor; Mick Thomson; Jim Root; Paul Gray; Joey Jordison; Shawn Crahan; Chris Fehn; Sid Wilson; Craig Jones ‡	All Hope Is Gone	2008		
"742617000027"	Corey Taylor; Mick Thomson; Paul Gray; Joey Jordison; Shawn Crahan; Chris Fehn; Sid Wilson; Craig Jones	Slipknot	1999		
"A Liar's Funeral"	Corey Taylor; Jim Root; Shawn Crahan	We Are Not Your Kind	2019		
"Acidic"	Corey Taylor; Mick Thomson; Jim Root; Shawn Crahan; Alessandro Venturella; Michael Pfaff	The End, So Far	2022		
"Adderall"	Corey Taylor; Jim Root; Shawn Crahan; Sid Wilson; Alessandro Venturella; Michael Pfaff	The End, So Far	2022		
"All Hope Is Gone" †	Corey Taylor; Mick Thomson; Jim Root; Paul Gray; Joey Jordison; Shawn Crahan; Chris Fehn; Sid Wilson; Craig Jones ‡	All Hope Is Gone	2008		
"All Out Life" †	Corey Taylor; Jim Root; Shawn Crahan	"All Out Life"	2018		(Note: "All Out Life" was released as a bonus track on the Japanese deluxe edition of We Are Not Your Kind.)
"AOV"	Corey Taylor; Jim Root	.5: The Gray Chapter	2014		(Note: "AOV" stands for "Approaching Original Violence".)
"Be Prepared for Hell"	Corey Taylor; Jim Root; Shawn Crahan	.5: The Gray Chapter	2014		
"Before I Forget" †	Corey Taylor; Mick Thomson; Jim Root; Paul Gray; Joey Jordison; Shawn Crahan; Chris Fehn; Sid Wilson; Craig Jones ‡	Vol. 3: (The Subliminal Verses)	2004		
"Birth of the Cruel" †	Corey Taylor; Jim Root; Shawn Crahan	We Are Not Your Kind	2019		
"Bone Church" †	Corey Taylor	"Bone Church"	2023		
"Butcher's Hook"	Corey Taylor; Mick Thomson; Jim Root; Paul Gray; Joey Jordison; Shawn Crahan; Chris Fehn; Sid Wilson; Craig Jones ‡	All Hope Is Gone	2008		
"Child of Burning Time"	Corey Taylor; Mick Thomson; Jim Root; Paul Gray; Joey Jordison; Shawn Crahan; Chris Fehn; Sid Wilson; Craig Jones ‡	All Hope Is Gone	2008		
"Circle"	Corey Taylor; Mick Thomson; Jim Root; Paul Gray; Joey Jordison; Shawn Crahan; Chris Fehn; Sid Wilson; Craig Jones ‡	Vol. 3: (The Subliminal Verses)	2004		
"Confessions"	Anders Colsefni; Donnie Steele; Josh Brainard; Paul Gray; Joey Jordison; Shawn Crahan ‡	Mate. Feed. Kill. Repeat.	1996		
"Critical Darling"	Corey Taylor; Corey TaylorMick Thomson; Jim Root; Shawn Crahan	We Are Not Your Kind	2019		
"Custer" †	Corey Taylor; Jim Root	.5: The Gray Chapter	2014		
"Danger – Keep Away"	Corey Taylor; Mick Thomson; Jim Root; Paul Gray; Joey Jordison; Shawn Crahan; Chris Fehn; Sid Wilson; Craig Jones ‡	Vol. 3: (The Subliminal Verses)	2004		
"De Sade"	Corey Taylor; Jim Root; Shawn Crahan; Sid Wilson; Alessandro Venturella	The End, So Far	2022		
"Dead Memories" †	Corey Taylor; Mick Thomson; Jim Root; Paul Gray; Joey Jordison; Shawn Crahan; Chris Fehn; Sid Wilson; Craig Jones ‡	All Hope Is Gone	2008		
"Death Because of Death"	Corey Taylor; Jim Root; Shawn Crahan	We Are Not Your Kind	2019		
"Despise"	Corey Taylor; Paul Gray; Joey Jordison; Shawn Crahan	Slipknot	1999		(Note: "Despise", "Get This" and "Interloper" were released as bonus tracks on special editions of Slipknot.)
"Diluted"	Corey Taylor; Mick Thomson; Paul Gray; Joey Jordison; Shawn Crahan; Chris Fehn; Sid Wilson; Craig Jones	Slipknot	1999		
"Disasterpiece"	Corey Taylor; Mick Thomson; Jim Root; Paul Gray; Joey Jordison; Shawn Crahan; Chris Fehn; Sid Wilson; Craig Jones ‡	Iowa	2001		
"Do Nothing/Bitchslap"	Anders Colsefni; Donnie Steele; Josh Brainard; Paul Gray; Joey Jordison; Shawn Crahan ‡	Mate. Feed. Kill. Repeat.	1996		
"Dogfish Rising"	Anders Colsefni; Donnie Steele; Josh Brainard; Paul Gray; Joey Jordison; Shawn Crahan ‡	Mate. Feed. Kill. Repeat.	1996		(Note: "Dogfish Rising" is a hidden track at the end of "Killers Are Quiet".)
"Don't Get Close"	Corey Taylor; Mick Thomson; Jim Root; Paul Gray; Joey Jordison; Shawn Crahan; Chris Fehn; Sid Wilson; Craig Jones ‡	"Duality"	2004		(Note: "Don't Get Close" and "Scream" were also released as bonus tracks on special editions of Vol. 3: (The Subliminal Verses).)
"Duality" †	Corey Taylor; Mick Thomson; Jim Root; Paul Gray; Joey Jordison; Shawn Crahan; Chris Fehn; Sid Wilson; Craig Jones ‡	Vol. 3: (The Subliminal Verses)	2004		
"Eeyore"	Corey Taylor; Paul Gray; Joey Jordison; Shawn Crahan	Slipknot	1999		(Note: "Eeyore" was originally a hidden track at the end of "Scissors".)
"Everything Ends"	Corey Taylor; Mick Thomson; Jim Root; Paul Gray; Joey Jordison; Shawn Crahan; Chris Fehn; Sid Wilson; Craig Jones ‡	Iowa	2001		
"Eyeless"	Corey Taylor; Mick Thomson; Paul Gray; Joey Jordison; Shawn Crahan; Chris Fehn; Sid Wilson; Craig Jones	Slipknot	1999		
"Finale"	Corey Taylor; Mick Thomson; Jim Root; Shawn Crahan; Alessandro Venturella; Michael Pfaff	The End, So Far	2022		
"Frail Limb Nursery"	Corey Taylor; Mick Thomson; Paul Gray; Joey Jordison; Shawn Crahan; Chris Fehn; Sid Wilson; Craig Jones	Slipknot	1999		
"Gehenna"	Corey Taylor; Mick Thomson; Jim Root; Paul Gray; Joey Jordison; Shawn Crahan; Chris Fehn; Sid Wilson; Craig Jones ‡	All Hope Is Gone	2008		
"Gematria (The Killing Name)"	Corey Taylor; Mick Thomson; Jim Root; Paul Gray; Joey Jordison; Shawn Crahan; Chris Fehn; Sid Wilson; Craig Jones ‡	All Hope Is Gone	2008		
"Gently"	Corey Taylor; Mick Thomson; Jim Root; Paul Gray; Joey Jordison; Shawn Crahan; Chris Fehn; Sid Wilson; Craig Jones ‡	Iowa	2001		(Note: Early recordings of "Gently", "Only One" and "Tattered and Torn" were released on Mate. Feed. Kill. Repeat.)
"Get This"	Corey Taylor; Paul Gray; Joey Jordison; Shawn Crahan	Slipknot	1999		
"Goodbye" †	Corey Taylor	.5: The Gray Chapter	2014		
"H377"	Corey Taylor; Mick Thomson; Jim Root; Shawn Crahan; Alessandro Venturella	The End, So Far	2022		(Note: Pronounced "Hell")
"Heirloom"	Corey Taylor; Mick Thomson; Jim Root; Shawn Crahan; Alessandro Venturella	The End, So Far	2022		
"Hive Mind"	Corey Taylor; Mick Thomson; Jim Root; Shawn Crahan; Alessandro Venturella	The End, So Far	2022		(Note: "Hive Mind" was originally titled "Hivemind", but was renamed before release. It retains the original name on vinyl pressings of the album)
"I Am Hated"	Corey Taylor; Mick Thomson; Jim Root; Paul Gray; Joey Jordison; Shawn Crahan; Chris Fehn; Sid Wilson; Craig Jones ‡	Iowa	2001		
"If Rain Is What You Want"	Corey Taylor; Jim Root; Craig Jones	.5: The Gray Chapter	2014		
"Insert Coin"	Corey Taylor; Jim Root; Shawn Crahan	We Are Not Your Kind	2019		
"Interloper"	Corey Taylor; Paul Gray; Joey Jordison; Shawn Crahan	Slipknot	1999		
"Iowa"	Corey Taylor; Mick Thomson; Jim Root; Paul Gray; Joey Jordison; Shawn Crahan; Chris Fehn; Sid Wilson; Craig Jones ‡	Iowa	2001		
"Killers Are Quiet"	Anders Colsefni; Donnie Steele; Josh Brainard; Paul Gray; Joey Jordison; Shawn Crahan ‡	Mate. Feed. Kill. Repeat.	1996		
"Killpop" †	Corey Taylor; Jim Root	.5: The Gray Chapter	2014		
"Lech"	Corey Taylor	.5: The Gray Chapter	2014		
"Left Behind" †	Corey Taylor; Mick Thomson; Jim Root; Paul Gray; Joey Jordison; Shawn Crahan; Chris Fehn; Sid Wilson; Craig Jones ‡	Iowa	2001		
"Liberate"	Corey Taylor; Mick Thomson; Paul Gray; Joey Jordison; Shawn Crahan; Chris Fehn; Sid Wilson; Craig Jones	Slipknot	1999		
"Medicine for the Dead"	Corey Taylor; Mick Thomson; Jim Root; Shawn Crahan; Alessandro Venturella	The End, So Far	2022		
"Me Inside"	Corey Taylor; Paul Gray; Joey Jordison; Shawn Crahan	Slipknot	1999		(Note: "Me Inside" replaced "Frail Limb Nursery" and "Purity" on the first reissue of Slipknot, and also featured on later pressings.)
"Metabolic"	Corey Taylor; Mick Thomson; Jim Root; Paul Gray; Joey Jordison; Shawn Crahan; Chris Fehn; Sid Wilson; Craig Jones ‡	Iowa	2001		
"My Pain"	Corey Taylor; Jim Root; Shawn Crahan	We Are Not Your Kind	2019		
"My Plague" †	Corey Taylor; Mick Thomson; Jim Root; Paul Gray; Joey Jordison; Shawn Crahan; Chris Fehn; Sid Wilson; Craig Jones ‡	Iowa	2001		
"New Abortion"	Corey Taylor; Mick Thomson; Jim Root; Paul Gray; Joey Jordison; Shawn Crahan; Chris Fehn; Sid Wilson; Craig Jones ‡	Iowa	2001		
"Nero Forte" †	Corey Taylor; Mick Thomson; Jim Root; Shawn Crahan	We Are Not Your Kind	2019		
"No Life"	Corey Taylor; Mick Thomson; Paul Gray; Joey Jordison; Shawn Crahan; Chris Fehn; Sid Wilson; Craig Jones	Slipknot	1999		
"Nomadic"	Corey Taylor	.5: The Gray Chapter	2014		
"Not Long for This World"	Corey Taylor; Jim Root; Shawn Crahan	We Are Not Your Kind	2019		
"Only One"	Corey Taylor; Mick Thomson; Paul Gray; Joey Jordison; Shawn Crahan; Chris Fehn; Sid Wilson; Craig Jones	Slipknot	1999		
"Opium of the People"	Corey Taylor; Mick Thomson; Jim Root; Paul Gray; Joey Jordison; Shawn Crahan; Chris Fehn; Sid Wilson; Craig Jones ‡	Vol. 3: (The Subliminal Verses)	2004		
"Orphan"	Corey Taylor; Jim Root; Shawn Crahan	We Are Not Your Kind	2019		
"Override"	Corey Taylor; Jim Root	.5: The Gray Chapter	2014		(Note: "Override" and "The Burden" were released as bonus tracks on special editions of .5: The Gray Chapter.)
"People = Shit"	Corey Taylor; Mick Thomson; Jim Root; Paul Gray; Joey Jordison; Shawn Crahan; Chris Fehn; Sid Wilson; Craig Jones ‡	Iowa	2001		
"Prelude 3.0"	Corey Taylor; Mick Thomson; Jim Root; Paul Gray; Joey Jordison; Shawn Crahan; Chris Fehn; Sid Wilson; Craig Jones ‡	Vol. 3: (The Subliminal Verses)	2004		
"Prosthetics"	Corey Taylor; Mick Thomson; Paul Gray; Joey Jordison; Shawn Crahan; Chris Fehn; Sid Wilson; Craig Jones	Slipknot	1999		
"Psychosocial" †	Corey Taylor; Mick Thomson; Jim Root; Paul Gray; Joey Jordison; Shawn Crahan; Chris Fehn; Sid Wilson; Craig Jones ‡	All Hope Is Gone	2008		
"Pulse of the Maggots"	Corey Taylor; Mick Thomson; Jim Root; Paul Gray; Joey Jordison; Shawn Crahan; Chris Fehn; Sid Wilson; Craig Jones ‡	Vol. 3: (The Subliminal Verses)	2004		
"Purity"	Corey Taylor; Mick Thomson; Paul Gray; Joey Jordison; Shawn Crahan; Chris Fehn; Sid Wilson; Craig Jones	Slipknot	1999		
"Red Flag"	Corey Taylor; Jim Root; Shawn Crahan	We Are Not Your Kind	2019		
"Red or Redder"		Adderall	2023		
"Sarcastrophe"	Corey Taylor; Jim Root	.5: The Gray Chapter	2014		
"Scissors"	Corey Taylor; Mick Thomson; Paul Gray; Joey Jordison; Shawn Crahan; Chris Fehn; Sid Wilson; Craig Jones	Slipknot	1999		
"Scream"	Corey Taylor; Mick Thomson; Jim Root; Paul Gray; Joey Jordison; Shawn Crahan; Chris Fehn; Sid Wilson; Craig Jones ‡	"Vermilion"	2004		
"Skeptic"	Corey Taylor; Jim Root	.5: The Gray Chapter	2014		
"Skin Ticket"	Corey Taylor; Mick Thomson; Jim Root; Paul Gray; Joey Jordison; Shawn Crahan; Chris Fehn; Sid Wilson; Craig Jones ‡	Iowa	2001		
"Slipknot"	Anders Colsefni; Donnie Steele; Josh Brainard; Paul Gray; Joey Jordison; Shawn Crahan ‡	Mate. Feed. Kill. Repeat.	1996		
"Snap"	Corey Taylor; Paul Gray; Joey Jordison; Shawn Crahan	Slipknot	1999		(Note: "Snap" was also later released on the soundtrack to Freddy vs. Jason.)
"Snuff" †	Corey Taylor; Mick Thomson; Jim Root; Paul Gray; Joey Jordison; Shawn Crahan; Chris Fehn; Sid Wilson; Craig Jones ‡	All Hope Is Gone	2008		
"Solway Firth" †	Corey Taylor; Jim Root; Shawn Crahan	We Are Not Your Kind	2019		
"Some Feel"	Anders Colsefni; Donnie Steele; Josh Brainard; Paul Gray; Joey Jordison; Shawn Crahan ‡	Mate. Feed. Kill. Repeat.	1996		
"Spiders"	Corey TaylorMick Thomson; Jim Root; Shawn Crahan	We Are Not Your Kind	2019		
"Spit It Out" †	Corey Taylor; Mick Thomson; Paul Gray; Joey Jordison; Shawn Crahan; Chris Fehn; Sid Wilson; Craig Jones	Slipknot	1999		
"Sulfur" †	Corey Taylor; Mick Thomson; Jim Root; Paul Gray; Joey Jordison; Shawn Crahan; Chris Fehn; Sid Wilson; Craig Jones ‡	All Hope Is Gone	2008		
"Surfacing"	Corey Taylor; Mick Thomson; Paul Gray; Joey Jordison; Shawn Crahan; Chris Fehn; Sid Wilson; Craig Jones	Slipknot	1999		
"Tattered & Torn"	Corey Taylor; Mick Thomson; Paul Gray; Joey Jordison; Shawn Crahan; Chris Fehn; Sid Wilson; Craig Jones	Slipknot	1999		
"The Blister Exists" †	Corey Taylor; Mick Thomson; Jim Root; Paul Gray; Joey Jordison; Shawn Crahan; Chris Fehn; Sid Wilson; Craig Jones ‡	Vol. 3: (The Subliminal Verses)	2004		
"The Burden"	Corey Taylor; Jim Root	.5: The Gray Chapter	2014		(Note: "The Burden" is followed by three hidden tracks respectively titled by fans, "-Silent-", "-Talk-" and "-Funny-", until 2022 when Corey Taylor revealed they respectively had no title, and were called "Huffys Between Dumpsters" and "Flea Circus".)
"The Chapeltown Rag" †	Corey Taylor; Jim Root; Shawn Crahan; Alessandro Venturella	The End, So Far	2021		(Note: "The Chapeltown Rag" was released as a single in 2021 before being released on The End, So Far in 2022.)
"The Devil in I" †	Corey Taylor; Jim Root	.5: The Gray Chapter	2014		
"The Dying Song (Time to Sing)" †	Corey Taylor; Jim Root; Shawn Crahan; Alessandro Venturella; Michael Pfaff	The End, So Far	2022		(Note: "The Dying Song (Time to Sing)" was released as "Dying Song" on vinyl pressings of the album.)
"The Heretic Anthem"	Corey Taylor; Mick Thomson; Jim Root; Paul Gray; Joey Jordison; Shawn Crahan; Chris Fehn; Sid Wilson; Craig Jones ‡	Iowa	2001		(Note: "The Heretic Anthem" was released as a promotional single under the working title "Heretic Song".)
"The Nameless" †	Corey Taylor; Mick Thomson; Jim Root; Paul Gray; Joey Jordison; Shawn Crahan; Chris Fehn; Sid Wilson; Craig Jones ‡	Vol. 3: (The Subliminal Verses)	2004		
"The Negative One" †	Corey Taylor; Jim Root	.5: The Gray Chapter	2014		
"The One That Kills the Least"	Corey Taylor; Jim Root	.5: The Gray Chapter	2014		
"The Shape"	Corey Taylor; Mick Thomson; Jim Root; Paul Gray; Joey Jordison; Shawn Crahan; Chris Fehn; Sid Wilson; Craig Jones ‡	Iowa	2001		
"The Virus of Life"	Corey Taylor; Mick Thomson; Jim Root; Paul Gray; Joey Jordison; Shawn Crahan; Chris Fehn; Sid Wilson; Craig Jones ‡	Vol. 3: (The Subliminal Verses)	2004		
"This Cold Black"	Corey Taylor; Mick Thomson; Jim Root; Paul Gray; Joey Jordison; Shawn Crahan; Chris Fehn; Sid Wilson; Craig Jones ‡	All Hope Is Gone	2008		
"Three Nil"	Corey Taylor; Mick Thomson; Jim Root; Paul Gray; Joey Jordison; Shawn Crahan; Chris Fehn; Sid Wilson; Craig Jones ‡	Vol. 3: (The Subliminal Verses)	2004		
"Unsainted" †	Corey Taylor; Jim Root; Shawn Crahan; Alessandro Venturella	We Are Not Your Kind	2019		
"Vendetta"	Corey Taylor; Mick Thomson; Jim Root; Paul Gray; Joey Jordison; Shawn Crahan; Chris Fehn; Sid Wilson; Craig Jones ‡	All Hope Is Gone	2008		
"Vermilion" †	Corey Taylor; Mick Thomson; Jim Root; Paul Gray; Joey Jordison; Shawn Crahan; Chris Fehn; Sid Wilson; Craig Jones ‡	Vol. 3: (The Subliminal Verses)	2004		
"Vermilion Pt. 2" †	Corey Taylor; Mick Thomson; Jim Root; Paul Gray; Joey Jordison; Shawn Crahan; Chris Fehn; Sid Wilson; Craig Jones ‡	Vol. 3: (The Subliminal Verses)	2004		
"Wait and Bleed" †	Corey Taylor; Mick Thomson; Paul Gray; Joey Jordison; Shawn Crahan; Chris Fehn; Sid Wilson; Craig Jones	Slipknot	1999		
"Warranty"	Corey Taylor; Jim Root; Shawn Crahan; Alessandro Venturella; Michael Pfaff	The End, So Far	2022		
"Welcome"	Corey Taylor; Mick Thomson; Jim Root; Paul Gray; Joey Jordison; Shawn Crahan; Chris Fehn; Sid Wilson; Craig Jones ‡	Vol. 3: (The Subliminal Verses)	2004		
"What's Next"	Corey Taylor; Jim Root; Shawn Crahan	We Are Not Your Kind	2019		
"Wherein Lies Continue"	Corey Taylor; Mick Thomson; Jim Root; Paul Gray; Joey Jordison; Shawn Crahan; Chris Fehn; Sid Wilson; Craig Jones ‡	All Hope Is Gone	2008		
"XIX"	Corey Taylor; Jim Root; Shawn Crahan	.5: The Gray Chapter	2014		
"Yen" †	Corey Taylor; Jim Root; Shawn Crahan; Sid Wilson; Alessandro Venturella; Michael Pfaff	The End, So Far	2022		

== Unofficially released and unreleased songs ==
Title	Writer(s)	Original release	Year	Ref.	Notes
"Be with You"			2001		
"Carve"		Excerpts from Current Project	1996		
"Coleslaw"		1997 Demo	1997		
"Fur"		Mate. Feed. Kill. Repeat.	1996		
"Happy Ending"	Corey Taylor; Shawn Crahan		2003		
"Killing Leslie"			1998		
"Logged Them"			2001		
"Lust Disease"		Battle of the Bands Demo	1997		
"May 17"		Excerpts from Current Project	1996		
"Nature"		Battle of the Bands Demo	1997		
"Part of Me"	Anders Colsefni; Donnie Steele; Josh Brainard; Paul Gray; Joey Jordison; Shawn Crahan ‡	Mate. Feed. Kill. Repeat.	1996		
"Rites and Rage"	Anders Colsefni; Donnie Steele; Josh Brainard; Paul Gray; Joey Jordison; Shawn Crahan ‡	Mate. Feed. Kill. Repeat.	1996		
"Sauce"			1996		
"Vizqueen"	Anders Colsefni; Donnie Steele; Josh Brainard; Paul Gray; Joey Jordison; Shawn Crahan ‡	Mate. Feed. Kill. Repeat.	1996		
"Wave Like the Pope"	Anders Colsefni; Donnie Steele; Josh Brainard; Paul Gray; Joey Jordison; Shawn Crahan ‡	Mate. Feed. Kill. Repeat.	1996		
"Without the Gray"	Corey Taylor; Shawn Crahan		2014		
"Windows"		Excerpts from Current Project	1996		

== See also ==
- Slipknot discography
