= AOV =

AOV could refer to:

== Technology, science, and medicine ==
- Aortic velocity (AoV), the speed of blood flow in the aorta of the heart
- Aortic valve (AoV)
- Air operated valve
- Analysis of variance, also known as ANOVA
- Angle of view (AOV), a concept in photography
- Automatic opening vent, a window or roof light that will open mechanically to allow smoke to be evacuated out of a building
- Arbitrary output variable, a feature of 3D-Rendering software (including RenderMan and Blender) to pass custom rendering data to post-processing

== Business ==
- Average order value, a term from advertising and marketing; see Post-click marketing

== Arts and entertainment ==
- Akademische Orchestervereinigung, an orchestra in Göttingen, Germany
- "AOV" (song), a song by Slipknot
- AOV Adult Movie Channel, a nationwide Canadian cable channel
- Arena of Valor, a multiplayer online battle arena developed and published by Tencent Games

== Other ==
- Algemeen Ouderen Verbond, the General Elderly Alliance, a Dutch political party
- "Any other variety", a classification at cat shows for cats that do not qualify as something more specific under particular breed standards; see Oriental Shorthair
