= Day of the Gusano: Live in Mexico =

Live album and video by Slipknot
- Released: October 20, 2017
- Recorded: December 5, 2015
- Genres: Nu metal; alternative metal
- Length: 79:47
- Label: Eagle Vision

Slipknot chronology
.5: The Gray Chapter (2014)	Day of the Gusano: Live in Mexico (2017)	We Are Not Your Kind (2019)

Day of the Gusano: Live in Mexico is the second live album by American heavy metal band Slipknot. The album features the first concert in Mexico from the ensemble, which took place on December 5, 2015. Shown in movie theatres on September 6, 2017, the album was released on October 20, 2017 by Eagle Vision. It was the band's first live album since 2005's 9.0: Live, and the first live album to feature bassist Alessandro Venturella and drummer Jay Weinberg, after the death of original bassist Paul Gray in 2010 and the departure of drummer Joey Jordison in 2013. It is also the band's final live album to feature their longtime percussionist Chris Fehn before his dismissal from the band due to a lawsuit in March 2019.

== Track listing ==
No.	Title	Original release	Length
1.	"Sarcastrophe"	.5: The Gray Chapter	4:50
2.	"The Heretic Anthem"	Iowa	3:57
3.	"Psychosocial"	All Hope Is Gone	4:36
4.	"The Devil in I"	.5: The Gray Chapter	6:24
5.	"Me Inside"	Slipknot	3:08
6.	"Vermilion"	Vol. 3: (The Subliminal Verses)	5:22
7.	"Wait and Bleed"	Slipknot	2:44
8.	"Prosthetics"	Slipknot	6:13
9.	"Before I Forget"	Vol. 3: (The Subliminal Verses)	4:26
10.	"Eeyore"	Slipknot	3:06
11.	"Duality"	Vol. 3: (The Subliminal Verses)	4:14
12.	"Custer"	.5: The Gray Chapter	4:36
13.	"Spit It Out"	Slipknot	6:51
14.	"Metabolic / 742617000027"	Iowa / Slipknot	4:45
15.	"(sic)"	Slipknot	4:11
16.	"People = Shit"	Iowa	5:20
17.	"Surfacing / Til We Die"	Slipknot / All Hope Is Gone	5:03
Total length:			79:47

== Personnel ==
Personnel taken from Day of the Gusano: Live in Mexico liner notes.

Slipknot

- Corey Taylor – vocals
- Craig Jones – samples
- Mick Thomson – guitar
- Chris Fehn – percussion
- Jim Root – guitar
- Alessandro Venturella – bass
- Sid Wilson – turntables
- Jay Weinberg – drums
- Shawn "Clown" Crahan – percussion

== Charts ==
Chart (2017)	Peak position
Hungarian Albums (MAHASZ)	39
German Albums (Offizielle Top 100)	25
