= Skeptic (disambiguation) =

A skeptic is one who practices skepticism.

Skeptic or Sceptic may also refer to:

== Arts and entertainment ==
- The Skeptics, a New Zealand post-punk band from 1979 to 1990
- The Skeptic (album), by Tilian, 2018
- "Skeptic" (song), by Slipknot, 2014
- The Skeptic (film), a 2009 film

=== Magazines ===
- The Skeptic (Australian magazine), of the Australian Skeptics
- The Skeptic (British magazine), founded in 1987
- Skeptic (American magazine), of The Skeptics Society, first published 1992

== Organizations ==
- Skeptic Society, a Russian-speaking skeptical society
- The Skeptics Society, a US-based international organization devoted to promoting scientific skepticism

== See also ==
- Skeptical Inquirer, US magazine, first published in 1976
- Denialism, a person's choice to deny reality, as a way to avoid a psychologically uncomfortable truth
