= The Negative One =

Single by Slipknot

from the album .5: The Gray Chapter
- Released: August 1, 2014
- Genre: Nu metal
- Length: 5:27
- Label: Roadrunner
- Songwriters: Jim Root; Corey Taylor
- Producers: Slipknot; Greg Fidelman

Slipknot singles chronology
"Snuff" (2009)	"The Negative One" (2014)	"The Devil in I" (2014)

Music video
- "The Negative One" on YouTube

"The Negative One" is a song by American heavy metal band Slipknot. Released on August 1, 2014, it was the band's first new song since the death of bassist Paul Gray in 2010 and the 2013 firing of drummer Joey Jordison. An accompanying music video premiered on Slipknot's official website on August 5, 2014; however, no band members were featured. Vocalist Corey Taylor told BBC Radio 1 that he saw the song as more of a "gift to the fans" than a regular single though it was still released as a digital single on iTunes and many other digital music retailers.

== Reception ==
The song was nominated for the Grammy Award for Best Metal Performance in 2015.

== Background ==
Before the release of this single, on February 27, 2014, all of the band's social media outlets were blacked out with no reason given. Later on, the band released small few second teasers for the new album each day, which turned out to be clips from the official video along with samples from the song.

== Musical style ==
"The Negative One" returns to a more aggressive and chaotic sound, similar to the sound of Iowa and the self-titled debut album. Among others, it contains double-bass attacks and stomping percussion strikes combined with fast riffs, shrieking samples, and continuous aggressive shouting and screaming by Corey Taylor. The drumming was compared to the style of Lamb of God's Chris Adler, which led some to the question if he was the new drummer for Slipknot, although Adler said the rumor was incorrect.

== Music video ==
The video was released on the band's official website via a private YouTube link after a countdown on their official site timed out on August 5. The next day, the video was made publicly available. Directed by Shawn Crahan, the music video features two women performing various acts along with props paying homage to some of Slipknot's earlier work. It does not feature any of the band members.

== Track listing ==
Digital download
No.	Title	Length
1.	"The Negative One"	5:26

UK promotional single
No.	Title	Length
1.	"The Negative One" (album version)	5:27
2.	"The Negative One" (clean version)	5:26

== Personnel ==
- Sid Wilson – turntables
- Chris Fehn – percussion, backing vocals
- Jim Root – guitars
- Craig Jones – keyboards, samples, media
- Shawn Crahan – percussion
- Mick Thomson – guitars
- Corey Taylor – lead vocals
- Jay Weinberg – drums
- Alessandro Venturella or Donnie Steele – bass

== Charts ==
Chart performance for "The Negative One"
Chart (2014)	Peak position
Australia (ARIA)	76
Canada Digital Songs (Billboard)	70
Scotland Singles (OCC)	51
UK Singles (OCC)	71
UK Rock & Metal (OCC)	1
US Hot Rock & Alternative Songs (Billboard)	21
