= Thomas-Michael Gribow =

German conductor

Thomas-Michael Gribow was conductor of the Akademische Orchestervereinigung in Göttingen, Germany from 1991-2003. He is also study leader and conductor of the Chemnitz Opera.
