= Akademische Orchestervereinigung Göttingen =

Symphony orchestra in Göttingen, Germany

The Akademische Orchestervereinigung Göttingen (AOV, Academic orchestral society) is a symphony orchestra in Göttingen, Germany. It was founded in 1906 by academics of the University of Göttingen.

Starting in 1950, Hermann Fuchs was the AOV's musical director for 37 years. Thomas-Michael Gribow was its conductor from 1991 to 2003; Lorenz Nordmeyer was appointed for this position in 2004.

The orchestra gained national recognition when it was instrumental in Oskar Hagen's initiative of rediscovering the operas of George Frideric Handel after World War I; this eventually lead to the Göttingen International Handel Festival. During that festival in 1935, the orchestra performed the first modern-day production of Handel's Partenope conducted by Fritz Lehmann. Two years earlier, it recorded Kurt Weill's Der Flug der Lindberghs under Hermann Fuchs. In 2000, it performed the world premiere of the "Overture to The Bad Room" by American composer Justin Laird Weaver.

The members of the orchestra form three chamber groups: the AOV Brass Quintet, the Foehrenberg-Quartett, and the Maggiore Quartett.

== Literature ==
- 75 Jahre Akademische Orchestervereinigung Göttingen: 1906–1981, Board of Akademische Orchestervereinigung Göttingen, 1981
