= Heat and smoke vent =

Heat and smoke vents are installed in buildings as an active fire protection measure. They are openings in the roof which are intended to vent the heat and smoke developed by a fire inside the building by the action of buoyancy, such that they are known as "gravity vents".

== Regulatory requirements ==
Heat and smoke vents are typically installed in buildings for the following reasons:

- Storage occupancies - The heat release rate from high piled storage commodities is expected to be very high. In such cases, it is considered by some fire protection professionals desirable to vent the heat from the building if the temperatures in the building reaches sufficiently high levels to endanger the structural stability of the roof system. Smoke venting is also considered to provide a minor benefit to increase the visibility in the interior space to facilitate manual fire fighting efforts for a limited period of time.

The use of vents in sprinklered buildings has been controversial over the last 25 years. Vent technology and sprinkler technology were developed independently of one another. Their interaction as beneficial technologies working together has not been successfully demonstrated. Many fire protection professionals are concerned that vents may cause sprinkler systems to fail to control a fire.

- Large internal volume spaces – Venting smoke from large spaces which regularly contain large numbers of people, such as malls and atria.

== Types ==
Automatic heat and smoke vents are available commercially in two general categories:

- Mechanically opened vent, powered by springs, pneumatic actuator, or electric motor.
- Drop-out vent – constructed of plastic which shrinks in the presence of heat (i.e., drop-out panel).

== Interaction with automatic fire sprinklers ==
The majority of guidance available for design of heat and smoke building vents installed in buildings is restricted to nonsprinklered, single-story buildings. This is partly a historical consequence of the installation of heat and smoke vents following the August 1953 General Motors, Livonia, MI major fire in a nonsprinklered manufacturing facility which effectively stopped the production of automatic transmissions for all of GM. Vents were also installed in storage buildings prior to the installation of fire sprinklers as a widespread warehousing industry practice. Subsequent to sprinklers being installed in storage buildings as a widespread practice, there has been a lack of consensus regarding the nature of the interaction of sprinklers and automatic heat and smoke vents. This lack of consensus continues to this day.

Automatic heat and smoke vents are required by model building codes in large, single-story factory and storage facilities in conjunction with control mode fire sprinklers, but are not permitted to be installed in conjunction with suppression mode, e.g., ESFR, fire sprinklers unless the vents are manually operated or have an operating mechanism with a thermal rating of not less than 360 °F. due to fear of overwhelming the sprinkler system and destroying the building.

== See also ==
- Smoke exhaust ductwork
- Pressurisation ductwork
- Grease duct
- Passive fire protection
- Active fire protection
