= Post-click marketing =

Post-click marketing is emerging as a practice that aims at improving sales and marketing results by focusing on website visitors when they respond to online marketing activities such as pay per click advertising, HTML e-mails, and paid searches with the objective on increasing conversion rates.

It is focused on those sources of traffic that someone clicks from such as display advertisements, keyword searching, email or social media links, and so on. It involves the theoretical models of behavioral marketing to create the profile of web visitors’ online behavior. Therefore, figuring out the context of the target audience is typically the first step to making an effective post-click marketing strategy. Next, those clicked visitors can be segmented into different content and communication channels on basis of their needs and interests, so the navigation of the landing page is especially important for the final conversions. The MECE principle can help the website segment the choices of visitors exhaustively. During this period, READY frameworks in content marketing are suggested to adopt, making the content persuasive. Besides, the presentation of the landing page including the positions, layouts, images and interaction features also contributes to the final conversions. Finally, conversion optimisation involves many performance metrics such as CPA (cost per acquisition), AOV (average order value), ROAS (return on ad spend), LTV (lifetime value) and ROI (overall return on investment). Post-click marketing can also increase its efficiency to create production and improvements continuously by integrating agile marketing practices.

Post-click marketing relies on specific software and services that go beyond the information collected by popular web analytic tools such as Google Analytics. For example, they distinguish themselves in their ability to supplement IP addresses with data from third-party sources, enabling marketing managers to view the name of the company visiting their website, their location, and the industry they are in.

There are many ways in which this information gathered about website visitors can be used. Marketers might wish to use the information to detect if they are attracting their desired target audience to their landing pages, or to personalize the content based on the visitor’s language or location. Inside Sales tend to use it for lead generation purposes, writing emails to email contacts they can find for the visiting organization.

Post-click marketing solutions appeal on many fronts:

- Businesses paying for the traffic to their website through pay per click, search engine optimization and other online activities use these tools to discover more about the estimated 98% (quoted by a case paper from the Marketing Sherpa) of visitors who don’t immediately convert into a lead.
- Inside Sales can view the keywords used by specific visitors to help qualify a person who has filled in a form on a landing page.
- Sales managers also find them attractive in their ability to generate email alerts to them when important customers visit their website.

These tools are not so much lead generation software, but more data extraction tools that can assist the early stages of a lead generation process.

With pressure to generate more leads with small budgets, these services are likely to grow in usage.

== Bibliography ==
- Principles and Practice of Marketing - David Jobber: 4th edition 2004
- The Leaky Funnel - Hugh MacFarlane: 2003
