= Killpop =

Single by Slipknot

from the album .5: The Gray Chapter
- Released: April 28, 2015
- Genre: Gothic metal
- Length: 3:45 (album version); 3:11 (radio edit)
- Label: Roadrunner
- Songwriters: Jim Root; Corey Taylor
- Producers: Greg Fidelman; Slipknot

Slipknot singles chronology
"Custer" (2014)	"Killpop" (2015)	"Goodbye" (2016)

Music video
- "Killpop" on YouTube

"Killpop" is a single by American heavy metal band Slipknot for their fifth major label studio album .5: The Gray Chapter.

The song was first released as a promotional single on October 16, 2014. It was the fifth promo and fourth overall single released from the album. The song received a retail single release in April 2015.

== Background ==
The song leaked two weeks prior to being officially released by the band on October 16, 2014. When officially released by the band, it featured original cover art like the other promotional singles released before it. When WGRD 97.9 asked frontman Corey Taylor about "Killpop", Taylor said:

"You know, what’s funny is over the last few weeks, I’ve really gotten everyone’s interpretation of what that song means to them, and it’s nowhere near what I wrote about. So it’s kind of interesting to hear people’s interpretations of what I’m singing about. And I’ll be honest with you: the song is my reflection on my relationship with music. That’s who the ‘she’ is. And not just music, but the music industry in general. So there’s a love-hate relationship there that really kind of comes into view. There's the old adage, 'Be careful what you wish for,' and, 'Be careful doing what you love, because sometimes it will turn on you.' And, you know, anytime you mix something that you love and business, you're gonna find the rusty cracks in there that piss you off. So that song, really, is about how much I still love making music, but also how much I just hate the business side, the numbers side, the people in the suits who try to run stuff, and having to deal with them and having to learn how to talk to them. And, you know, it's frustrating sometimes, but it is what it is. And luckily, we got a great song out of it, and we were able to really paint something really cool with it and just be able to put it out there for people to dig."

== Critical reception ==
Upon release, "Killpop" was met with positive reviews by critics and music sites. Loudwire stated, "Today, we were exposed to 'Killpop', which is arguably the poppiest Slipknot cut from .5: The Gray Chapter so far. Vocalist Corey Taylor is very front-and-center throughout the track, as Slipknot's new mystery drummer takes a step back from his death metal-inspired parts showcased throughout the new album so far." Metal Injection said, "Today, the band released their latest single, 'Killpop', and this one builds and builds and builds until it gets really heavy. It's definitely one of the standout tracks on the album."

== Music video ==
After the release of .5: The Gray Chapter, Corey Taylor stated that "Killpop" would be the next song from the album to get a music video. No information about the video was released between the point Taylor said the song would be getting a music video (circa November 2014) and on June 7, 2015, when the band's official Twitter revealed that the music video would be released on June 8. The music video switches between footage of the band members and two painted women wandering an abandoned building. Besides being shown playing together, each band member is also shown in their own scene either playing their instrument in an empty room or wandering the abandoned building. The two women are shown mirroring each other's movements and appear in the scenes of some of the band members. The two women in the video are Shauna and Shannon Baker, also known as The Baker Twins. Like other Slipknot videos, "Killpop" was directed by Shawn Crahan. It was the final Slipknot music video to feature percussionist Chris Fehn before his departure from the band on March 18, 2019.

== Promotion ==
"Killpop" was named Track of the Day on the UK radio station, BBC Radio 1 on January 19, 2015 (coinciding with the UK leg of Slipknot's Prepare for Hell tour). This meant the song was played in every show on the radio station throughout that day. "Killpop" was also included in BBC Radio 1's C Play List for that week. It was listed on BBC Radio 1's B Play List for the week commencing on February 16, 2015.

== Track listing ==
Digital Download

1. "Killpop" – 3:45

Promo CD

1. "Killpop" (edit) – 3:31

== Charts ==
=== Weekly charts ===
Weekly chart performance for "Killpop"
Chart (2014–15)	Peak position
UK Rock & Metal (Official Charts)	28
US Hot Rock & Alternative Songs (Billboard)	31
US Rock & Alternative Airplay (Billboard)	37

=== Year-end charts ===
Year-end chart performance for "Killpop"
Chart (2015)	Position
US Mainstream Rock (Billboard)	37
