= The Devil in I =

Single by Slipknot

from the album .5: The Gray Chapter
- Released: August 26, 2014
- Genre: Groove metal; hard rock
- Length: 4:11 (radio edit); 5:42 (album version)
- Label: Roadrunner
- Songwriters: Jim Root; Corey Taylor
- Producers: Slipknot; Greg Fidelman

Slipknot singles chronology
| "The Negative One" (2014) | "The Devil in I" (2014) | "Custer" (2014) |

Music video
- "The Devil in I" on YouTube

"The Devil in I" is a song by American heavy metal band Slipknot. The song was released on August 26, 2014, as the second single from their fifth studio album, .5: The Gray Chapter (2014). It was also the first single from the album to be released to radio and music channels, with the previous single ("The Negative One") being a digital only single. "The Devil in I" was released as a CD single on October 7, 2014.

In an interview with Loudwire, singer Corey Taylor revealed that the then new bass player and drummer would both be on stage (as opposed to former bassist Donnie Steele who played backstage out of sight) and both would wear the same mask, as the band felt it would be disrespectful for them to have individual masks at that time. However, he did not reveal their identities as the band kept them in a period of anonymity for some time for unexplained reasons. It was later revealed that these two new members were Alessandro Venturella on bass (previously the guitarist of Cry for Silence) and Jay Weinberg on drums (previously from The Reveling, Against Me! and the son of American drummer Max Weinberg of Bruce Springsteen and the E Street Band).

== Background ==
Shortly after the reveal of "The Negative One", another countdown was put up on Slipknot's official website telling fans to come back on August 11, 2014 at 10 am PDT for "A special announcement". The announcement was delayed but eventually revealed the cover art for the new single titled "The Devil in I". This was disappointing for some fans as Corey Taylor had already revealed the title of the single in an interview for BBC Radio 1 on August 4.

== Critical reception ==
Blabbermouth.net noted that the single "chugs out of a warbling doom line at the beginning and sets itself onto a morose but tuneful course with moody guitar chimes, dirge-loaded bass and empathetic swills from Corey Taylor," as well as noting that "The choruses are a little too safe, but a massive and quick-stepped breakdown plus a grinding bridge thereafter keeps the song robust and hectic."

== Music video ==
Plans for a music video for the song were revealed by Corey Taylor during an interview for BBC Radio 1. The band put out a casting call asking for "human maggots" for a video that was shot on August 22 and 23, 2014. They requested people between the ages of 20 and 35 with the condition they be okay with filming barefoot.

On September 11, 2014, Slipknot uploaded a trailer for "The Devil in I" music video to be uploaded the succeeding heyday; the trailer highlighted two people in red shrouds with eye-holes cut out. The video was uploaded on September 12 and featured the band members in a mental asylum encompassed by fans dancing in straitjackets while the band performed. It also featured Corey in his All Hope Is Gone mask and Clown in his Iowa mask. Chris Fehn is also seen in his Memorial World Tour mask.

The band commits suicide in various ways, such as Corey Taylor setting a bomb off while he sits at a table, Mick Thomson ripping his face apart, Sid Wilson eating himself, Craig Jones being locked in an elevator with an attack dog, Chris Fehn pecked to death by crows, Jim Root blowing himself up with dynamite (losing his beard in the process), and Shawn Crahan lighting himself on fire and hanging himself. The video also features the two new members of the band. They can be seen roaming throughout the asylum as patients in wheelchairs. They are eventually cornered by the band, who proceed to stab the new members. This stabbing could resemble the two new members being "baptized" into Slipknot. They appear playing with the band at the song's last chorus, both wearing uniforms and disguised in equal revels.

== Track listing ==
Digital Download

1. "The Devil in I" – 5:42

Best Buy CD single

1. "The Devil in I" – 6:00
2. "The Negative One" – 5:25

EU promotional CD

1. "The Devil in I" (album version) – 6:00
2. "The Devil in I" (radio edit) – 4:12

UK promotional CD

1. "The Devil in I" (edit) – 4:11
2. "The Devil in I" (album version) – 5:42

== Personnel ==
- Corey Taylor – vocals
- Mick Thomson – guitar
- Shawn Crahan – percussion
- Craig Jones – samples, media
- Jim Root – guitar
- Chris Fehn – percussion
- Sid Wilson – turntables
- Alex Venturella – bass
- Jay Weinberg – drums

== Charts ==
=== Weekly charts ===
Weekly chart performance for "The Devil in I"
| Chart (2014) | Peak positions |
|---|---|
| Australia (ARIA) | 88 |
| Scottish Singles Sales (Official Charts) | 72 |
| UK Singles (OCC) | 135 |
| UK Singles Sales (OCC) | 77 |
| UK Singles Downloads (Official Charts) | 76 |
| UK Rock & Metal (Official Charts) | 2 |
| US Bubbling Under Hot 100 (Billboard) | 23 |
| US Hot Rock & Alternative Songs (Billboard) | 12 |
| US Rock & Alternative Airplay (Billboard) | 21 |

=== Year-end charts ===
Year-end chart performance for "The Devil in I"
| Chart (2014) | Position |
|---|---|
| US Hot Rock & Alternative Songs (Billboard) | 67 |

== Certifications ==
Certifications for "The Devil in I"
| Region | Certification | Certified units/sales |
|---|---|---|
| Canada (Music Canada) | 2× Platinum | 160,000^{‡} |
| New Zealand (RMNZ) | Platinum | 30,000^{‡} |
| Portugal (AFP) | Gold | 10,000^{‡} |
| United Kingdom (BPI) | Gold | 400,000^{‡} |
| United States (RIAA) | Gold | 500,000^{‡} |
^{‡} Sales+streaming figures based on certification alone.
