= .5: The Gray Chapter =

2014 studio album by Slipknot

Studio album by Slipknot
- Released: October 21, 2014
- Recorded: March 1 – July 28, 2014
- Studios: Sunset Sound (Hollywood); The Sound Factory (Hollywood); Westlake Recording (Los Angeles); Jim Root's garage
- Genres: Alternative metal; nu metal
- Length: 73:28
- Label: Roadrunner
- Producers: Slipknot; Greg Fidelman

Slipknot chronology
Antennas to Hell (2012)	.5: The Gray Chapter (2014)	Day of the Gusano: Live in Mexico (2017)

Slipknot studio album chronology
All Hope Is Gone (2008)	.5: The Gray Chapter (2014)	We Are Not Your Kind (2019)

Singles from .5: The Gray Chapter
- 1. "The Negative One" Released: August 1, 2014; 2. "The Devil in I" Released: August 26, 2014; 3. "Custer" Released: October 10, 2014; 4. "Killpop" Released: April 28, 2015; 5. "Goodbye" Released: January 5, 2016

.5: The Gray Chapter is the fifth studio album by American heavy metal band Slipknot, released on October 17, 2014, by Roadrunner Records. It was the band’s first studio album in six years. It was also the first not to feature original bassist Paul Gray, who died in 2010 (the album title is a reference to his surname), or drummer Joey Jordison, who was fired from the band in late 2013. This is the only Slipknot album to feature original guitarist Donnie Steele on bass, although the specific tracks he played on are unknown. It is also the first Slipknot album to feature Alessandro Venturella on bass and Jay Weinberg on drums. The album includes six singles and has received commercial success and acclaiming reviews. A standard and deluxe edition of the album was released. It is also the band's final studio album to feature their longtime percussionist Chris Fehn before his dismissal from the band due to a lawsuit in March 2019.

"The Negative One" received a nomination for Best Metal Performance at the 57th annual Grammy Awards. The album was nominated for Best Rock Album the following year, along with a Best Metal Performance nomination for the song "Custer".

== Background ==
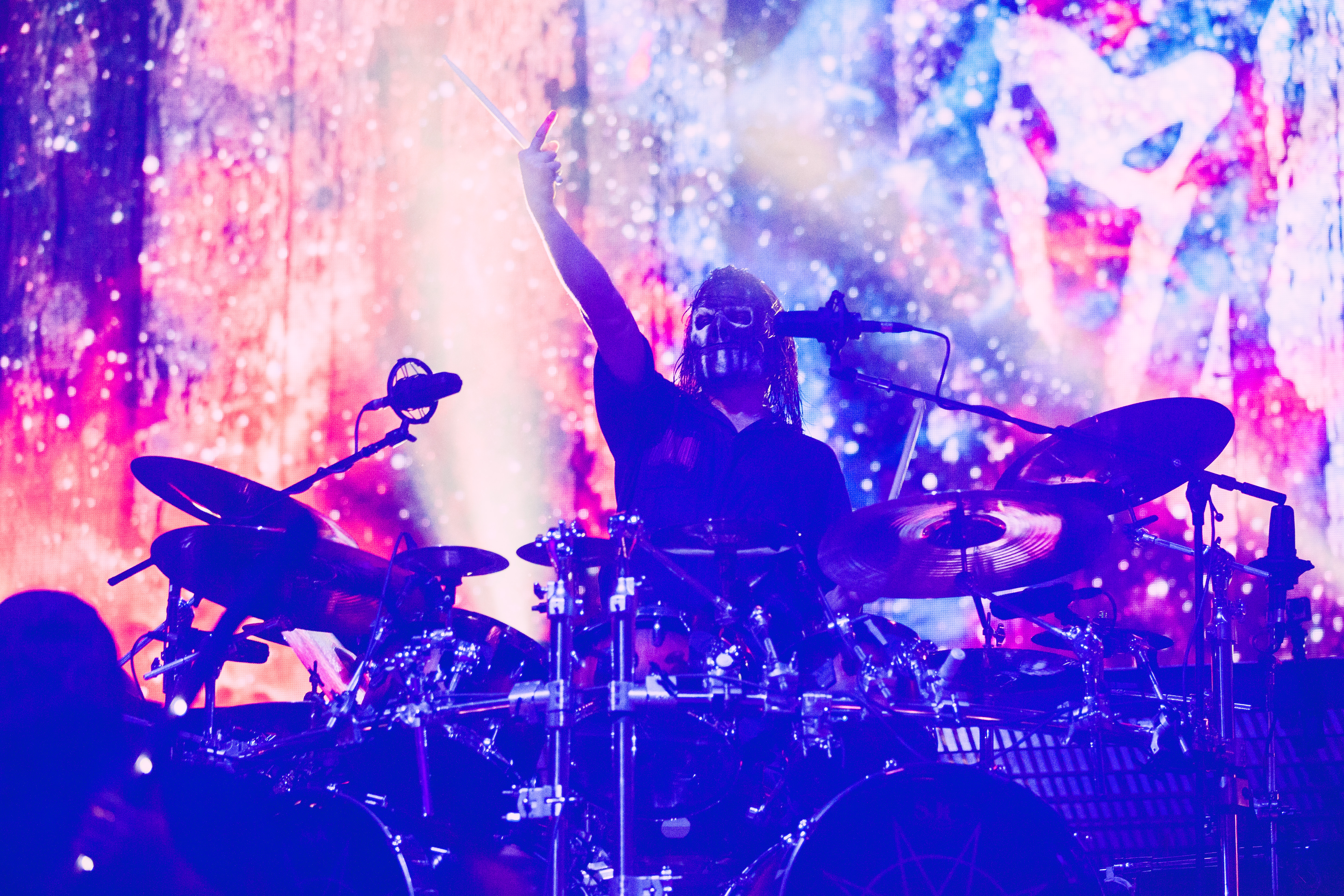
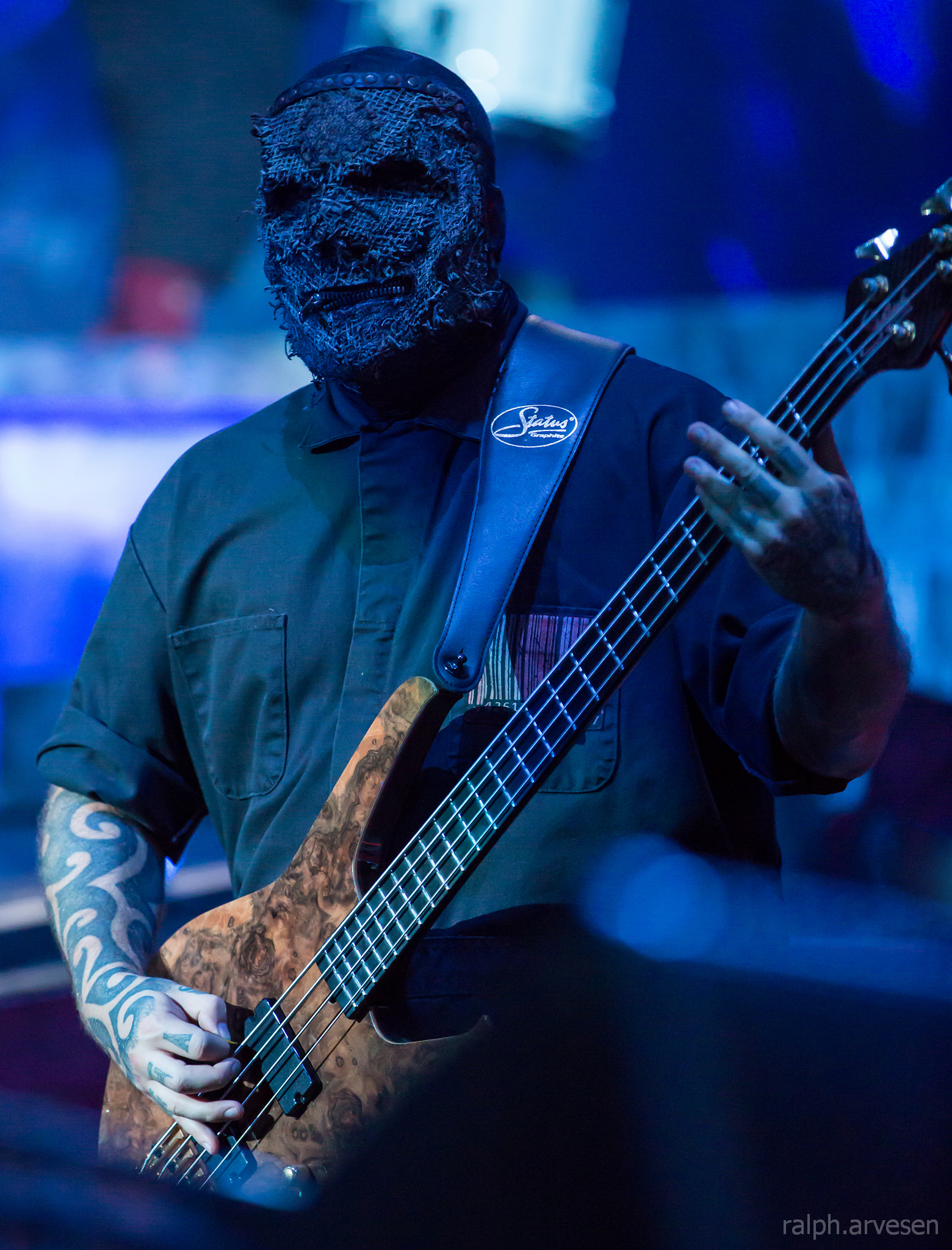
The two new members hired by Slipknot following the release of .5 The Gray Chapter, Jay Weinberg (top) and Alessandro Venturella (bottom)

The writing process of the record began in late 2013. Wanting to dedicate more time to the album, guitarist Jim Root decided not to tour with Stone Sour in January 2014.

A new bassist and drummer were added to the lineup during live shows. Taylor told Loudwire that two similar masks were created for their appearances in music videos and stage performances, as, when the new members were given the opportunity to make their own masks, the results were, according to Taylor, "kind of cartoony" and did not fit the mind set of Slipknot. Both members were briefly shown in the music video for "The Devil in I", but their identities had not been announced by Slipknot amidst speculation. Root revealed in an interview that founding guitarist and former touring bassist Donnie Steele was involved in some of the studio sessions for the album, but that ultimately Steele declined to rejoin the band in favor of starting a family with his wife. Bassist Alessandro Venturella of Krokodil was identified by the unique tattoos on his hands, performing in the video for "The Devil in I". Jay Weinberg from the band Against Me! was brought in to audition on drums after Joey Jordison was fired from Slipknot. Jay Weinberg is the son of Max Weinberg, the drummer for Bruce Springsteen's E Street Band and Conan O'Brien's drummer and band leader for his late night talk show. Max Weinberg introduced Jay Weinberg to Slipknot and from there on he forged a friendship by going to several concerts and being invited backstage; the band liked what he brought to the table and told him he was free to join if he wanted and he accepted. The album was produced by Greg Fidelman and mixed by Joe Barresi. Fidelman is known for his work with Metallica, System of a Down, Audioslave and more, as well as mixing Slipknot's third album, Vol. 3: (The Subliminal Verses), in 2004.

== Promotion and tour ==
On July 15, the band began releasing short teasers for the new album for over a two-week period that turned out to be clips from the official video along with samples from a song entitled "The Negative One". The song was released on August 1, 2014, and an accompanying video was released on August 5, 2014. It was directed by Shawn Crahan; however, it did not feature any of the band members. On August 13, 2014, the band revealed the cover art for their official radio single entitled "The Devil in I", and the single premiered on August 24, 2014. The official video for the single was unveiled on September 12 featuring the members with new variations of their masks with the exception of Taylor who debuted a new mask and the new bassist and drummer's masks which were very similar.

Slipknot began their world tour at the second iteration of Knotfest as headliners on October 25 and the 26 with Anthrax, Five Finger Death Punch, Otep and Black Label Society among others in California. A co-headline North American and European tour with Korn dubbed the Prepare for Hell tour commenced afterwards with King 810 in support. Slipknot and Korn embarked on the British leg of the Prepare For Hell tour in January 2015. In addition to the standard edition, a deluxe edition featuring two listed and three unlisted bonus tracks, and a special edition featuring a T-shirt of the album cover have also been released.

== Reception ==
=== Critical response ===
Professional ratings
Aggregate scores
Source	Rating
Metacritic	77/100
Review scores
Source	Rating
AllMusic	4/5 stars
Alternative Press	4/5 stars
Blabbermouth.net	8.5/10
Classic Rock	7/10 stars
Exclaim!	7/10
The Guardian	4/5 stars
Kerrang!	5/5 stars
Q	3/5 stars
Revolver	4.5/5 stars
Rolling Stone	2.5/5 stars

According to the review aggregator Metacritic, .5: The Gray Chapter received "generally favorable reviews" based on a weighted average score of 77 out of 100 from 13 critic scores. Most critics praised the return of their older sound from Slipknot and Iowa, while maintaining the melodies the band explored on Vol. 3: (The Subliminal Verses). Florino characterized it as "the most abrasive work since their self-titled debut," The Guardian's Dom Lawson as "every bit as warped and explosive as previous records" Ray Van Horn of Blabbermouth.net hailed the album as "a return to their punishing roots" and noted that "AOV" showcased some elements of thrash metal. Exclaim! critic Bradley Zorgdrager pointed out that Slipknot "wastes no time kicking it back to 2001's Iowa" while Metal Hammer's critic Dom Lawson noted that "there's plenty of [...] brutal, turbocharged Slipknot [...] here," while Rock Revolt mentioned that the album uses elements from their previous studio albums while "pushing the creative boundaries of [their] past albums into new territory." Q' magazine's Tom Bryant complained that the album's lighter tracks, namely "Goodbye," "Killpop," and "The One That Kills The Least," were "disappointingly timid." However, he followed by commenting that "It's possible to entirely forget these when Slipknot play to their strengths: unrelenting darkness and attack," using "Custer," "The Devil in I," and "Lech" as examples.

Several critics praised the way the album acknowledged Gray's memory. Rock Revolt noted plenty of lyrical content relating to Gray. While Revolver magazine critic Dan Epstein and Gregory Heaney from AllMusic concluded that "they don't try to sugarcoat their loss, anger or grief anywhere on the album," and that "from that deep well of pain, another great Slipknot record has emerged," and that "they're able to channel their grief into a productive album, allowing them to continue moving forward [...] with one of the strongest albums of their career," respectively. Zorgdrager saw it as "it's a considerable accomplishment and a lovely eulogy to their fallen comrade." Several critics appreciated the composition of the album, with Van Horn characterizing it as "a largely dark, often moving listening experience." Loudwire critic Chad Childers wrote noted the "mix of all the different sounds" creating "a musical journey" and pointed that while the album "rocks and pummels you in all the right places like you would hope, it also shows a depth in emotion and some heavily personal moments on a much grander scale," while Artistdirect critic Rick Florino gave the album a perfect rating concluding that "by the time this journey ends, it feels as if Slipknot have come full circle." Billboard critic Gary Suarez was a little more critical of the album stating, "for such an emotionally loaded comeback, .5: The Gray Chapter is Slipknot's least gripping LP. [...] "Skeptic" is lyrically awkward, but the band recovers well on processional closer "If Rain Is What You Want." Emblematic of both Slipknot's strengths and its weaknesses, perhaps this album is the sort of warts-and-all eulogy Gray would have wanted."

=== Accolades ===
The album's lead single, "The Negative One", was nominated for the 2014 Grammy Award for Best Metal Performance at the 57th Grammy Awards. Additionally, the album was nominated for the Best Rock Album and "Custer" was nominated for Best Metal Performance at the 58th Grammy Awards.

Year-end rankings

Publication	Accolade	Rank
Loudwire	20 Best Metal Albums of 2014	7
Revolver	20 Best Albums of 2014	1
Rolling Stone	20 Best Metal Albums of 2014	18

== Commercial performance ==
The Gray Chapter is Slipknot's second album to debut at number one on the US Billboard 200, selling 132,000 copies in its first week. The album also debuted at number one in Australia, Japan, Canada, Russia and Switzerland. It had top 5 debuts in the United Kingdom, Germany, Ireland, Austria, New Zealand, Mexico, Denmark and Finland.

== Track listing ==
All songs credited to Slipknot in the album liner notes. Writing credits taken from ASCAP.

No.	Title	Writer(s)	Length
1.	"XIX"	Corey Taylor; Jim Root; Shawn Crahan	3:10
2.	"Sarcastrophe"	Taylor; Root	5:06
3.	"AOV"	Taylor; Root	5:32
4.	"The Devil in I"	Taylor; Root	5:42
5.	"Killpop"	Taylor; Root	3:45
6.	"Skeptic"	Taylor; Root	4:46
7.	"Lech"	Taylor	4:50
8.	"Goodbye"	Taylor	4:35
9.	"Nomadic"	Taylor	4:18
10.	"The One That Kills the Least"	Taylor; Root	4:11
11.	"Custer"	Taylor; Root	4:14
12.	"Be Prepared for Hell"	Taylor; Root; Crahan	1:57
13.	"The Negative One"	Taylor; Root	5:25
14.	"If Rain Is What You Want"	Taylor; Root; Craig Jones	6:20
15.	"-Silent-" (hidden track) ( (Note: "-Silent-" acts as a pregap with 2 minutes of silence before the hidden tracks.)) ( (Note: The hidden tracks are not included in the digital version, clean version, or the vinyl version of the album.))		2:00
16.	"-Talk-" (hidden track)		6:19
17.	"-Funny-" (hidden track)		1:28
Total length:			73:28

Deluxe edition bonus tracks
No.	Title	Writer(s)	Length
15.	"Override"	Taylor; Root	5:37
16.	"The Burden"	Taylor; Root	5:23
17.	"-Silent-" (hidden track)		2:00
18.	"-Talk-" (hidden track)		6:19
19.	"-Funny-" (hidden track)		1:28
Total length:			84:38

Vinyl release - side one
No.	Title	Length
1.	"XIX"	3:10
2.	"Sarcastrophe"	5:06
3.	"AOV"	5:32
Total length:		13:48

Vinyl release - side two
No.	Title	Length
1.	"The Devil in I"	5:42
2.	"Killpop"	3:45
3.	"Skeptic"	4:46
Total length:		14:13

Vinyl release - side three
No.	Title	Length
1.	"Lech"	4:50
2.	"Goodbye"	4:35
3.	"Nomadic"	4:18
4.	"The One That Kills the Least"	4:11
Total length:		17:54

Vinyl release - side four
No.	Title	Length
1.	"Custer"	4:14
2.	"Be Prepared for Hell"	1:57
3.	"The Negative One"	5:25
4.	"If Rain Is What You Want"	6:20
Total length:		17:56

== Personnel ==
=== Slipknot ===
- Corey Taylor – lead vocals, bass on 'Goodbye',
- Mick Thomson – guitars
- Shawn "Clown" Crahan – percussion, backing vocals, additional drums on 'Goodbye' and 'If Rain Is What You Want', intro vocals on 'XIX' and 'Custer', lead vocals on 'Be Prepared For Hell'
- Craig "133" Jones – samples, keyboards
- Jim Root – guitars, bass
- Chris Fehn – percussion, backing vocals
- Sid Wilson – turntables
- Alessandro "Vman" Venturella – bass
- Jay Weinberg – drums

=== Additional musician ===
- Donnie Steele – bass

=== Production ===
- Slipknot – production
- Greg Fidelman – production, mixing on "XIX" and "Be Prepared For Hell"
- Joe Barresi – mixing
- Jim Monti – recording
- Greg Gordon – recording
- Sara Lyn Killion — recording
- Geoff Neal – assistant engineer
- Chris Claypool – assistant engineer
- Marcus Johnson – assistant engineer
- Evin O'Cleary – assistant engineer
- Vlado Meller – mastering
- Jeremy Lubsey – mastering assistant

=== Artwork ===
- Shawn Crahan – art direction, photography
- The Uprising Creative – design, layout

== Charts ==
=== Weekly charts ===
Weekly chart performance for .5 The Gray Chapter
Chart (2014)	Peak position
Australian Albums (ARIA)	1
Austrian Albums (Ö3 Austria)	2
Belgian Albums (Ultratop Flanders)	12
Belgian Albums (Ultratop Wallonia)	13
Canadian Albums (Billboard)	1
Danish Albums (Hitlisten)	5
Dutch Albums (Album Top 100)	13
Finnish Albums (Suomen virallinen lista)	4
French Albums (SNEP)	8
German Albums (Offizielle Top 100)	2
Hungarian Albums (MAHASZ)	3
Irish Albums (IRMA)	4
Italian Albums (FIMI)	6
Japanese Albums (Oricon)	1
New Zealand Albums (RMNZ)	2
Norwegian Albums (VG-lista)	4
Polish Albums (ZPAV)	29
Portuguese Albums (AFP)	9
Scottish Albums (Official Charts)	3
Spanish Albums (Promusicae)	17
Swedish Albums (Sverigetopplistan)	3
Swiss Albums (Schweizer Hitparade)	1
UK Albums (Official Charts)	2
UK Rock & Metal Albums (Official Charts)	1
US Billboard 200	1
US Top Hard Rock Albums (Billboard)	1
US Top Rock Albums (Billboard)	1

=== Year-end charts ===
Year-end chart performance for .5 The Gray Chapter
Chart (2014)	Position
Australian Albums (ARIA)	55
Austrian Albums (Ö3 Austria)	55
Belgian Albums (Ultratop Flanders)	132
German Albums (Offizielle Top 100)	70
US Billboard 200	96
US Top Hard Rock Albums (Billboard)	4
US Top Rock Albums (Billboard)	19

Chart (2015)	Position
US Top Hard Rock Albums (Billboard)	7
US Top Rock Albums (Billboard)	22

== Certifications ==
Certifications for .5 The Gray Chapter
Region	Certification	Certified units/sales
Australia (ARIA)	Gold	35,000^{^}
Austria (IFPI Austria)	Platinum	15,000^{*}
Canada (Music Canada)	Platinum	80,000^{‡}
Germany (BVMI)	Gold	100,000^{‡}
Hungary (MAHASZ)	Gold	1,000^{^}
New Zealand (RMNZ)	Gold	7,500^{‡}
Norway (IFPI Norway)	Gold	10,000^{‡}
Poland (ZPAV)	Gold	10,000^{‡}
United Kingdom (BPI)	Gold	100,000^{‡}
United States (RIAA)	Gold	500,000^{‡}
^{*} Sales figures based on certification alone.^{^} Shipments figures based on certification alone.^{‡} Sales+streaming figures based on certification alone.
