= XIX (song) =

Promotional single by Slipknot

from the album .5: The Gray Chapter
- Released: October 14, 2014
- Length: 3:11
- Label: Roadrunner
- Songwriter: Slipknot
- Producers: Greg Fidelman; Slipknot

Music video
- "XIX" on YouTube

"XIX" is a promotional single by American heavy metal band Slipknot and the opening track for their fifth major label studio album .5: The Gray Chapter.

The song was first released as a digital single on October 14, 2014 on the same day as its subsequent track "Sarcastrophe". It was the second promo released from the album. The official music video was uploaded to their official YouTube channel privately on October 5, 2015 and made available to subscribers to Outside the Nine updates early.

== Background ==
The song was uploaded to their official YouTube channel with a few days leading up to the release of .5: The Gray Chapter. The song was released along with "Sarcastrophe". Both featured original cover art. The song charted at number 36 on the US Rock Digital Songs chart.

An official music video was released for the song on October 5, 2015.

== Critical reception ==
Greg Kennelty described the song by saying "The song builds and builds, edging toward total paranoia, and finally arrives at… nothing." Metal Injection described the song as "Slipknot's most emo track off .5: The Gray Chapter."

== Charts ==
Chart (2015)	Peak position
US Rock Digital Songs (Billboard)	36
US Mainstream Rock (Billboard)	12
