= Goodbye (Slipknot song) =

Single by Slipknot

from the album .5: The Gray Chapter
- Released: January 5, 2016
- Genre: Hard rock
- Length: 4:35
- Label: Roadrunner
- Songwriter: Corey Taylor
- Producers: Greg Fidelman; Slipknot

Slipknot singles chronology
"Killpop" (2015)	"Goodbye" (2016)	"All Out Life" (2018)

CD cover

"Goodbye" is a song by the American heavy metal band Slipknot. It was released as the fifth and final single from their fifth studio album, .5: The Gray Chapter (2014).

== Background ==
"Goodbye" was initially going to be the introductory song for .5 The Gray Chapter but ended up becoming a full track. In an interview with Rolling Stone, Corey Taylor, the lead singer of Slipknot, explained that "Goodbye" was a song he had written about the death of Paul Gray, one of Slipknot's members. On the other hand, Slipknot's percussionist Shawn Crahan originally believed that "Goodbye" was about Taylor leaving the band. Taylor extended his explanation of the song to multiple magazines by saying that "Goodbye" was about the loss of words the band experienced after Gray's death and coming back together after "one of the darkest days of this band’s career".

== Composition ==
In an opinion piece by Slipknot's guitarist Jim Root, Root revealed that his performance in "Goodbye" was inspired by Radiohead guitarist Jonny Greenwood's playing style. Root also highlighted that the bass played by Corey Taylor was from the demo version of "Goodbye".

== Release ==
Although the audio for "Goodbye" was released in October 2014, the track was picked by Slipknot as an official single in December 2015. "Goodbye" was officially released as a single in January 2016.

== Reception ==
On one hand, critics praised Corey Taylor for his vocals on "Goodbye". Ray Van Horn Jr. of Blabbermouth.net praised Taylor for "staying largely in soar mode once the heavier masses take over the song", while Emilee Yaw of New-Transcendence complimented Taylor for establishing an emotional connection with the listener.

Alternatively, reviewers criticized Slipknot's music style on "Goodbye". Dave Hanratty of Drowned in Sound said the song was "a lumbering mix of balladry and stadium metal", while Mike Lawrence of Metal Descent heavily panned the song by accusing Slipknot of being arrogant in the track.

== Track listing ==
No.	Title	Length
1.	"Goodbye" (Edit)	3:22

== Personnel ==
- Corey Taylor – vocals, bass
- Mick Thomson – guitar
- Shawn "Clown" Crahan – percussion, additional drums
- Craig "133" Jones – sampling, keyboards
- Jim Root – guitar
- Chris Fehn – percussion
- Sid Wilson – turntables
- Jay Weinberg – drums

== Charts ==
Chart performance for "Goodbye"
Chart (2016)	Peak position
US Mainstream Rock (Billboard)	22
