= Custer (song) =

Single by Slipknot

from the album .5: The Gray Chapter
- Released: October 10, 2014
- Genre: Nu metal
- Length: 4:14
- Label: Roadrunner
- Songwriters: Corey Taylor; Jim Root
- Producer: Greg Fidelman

Slipknot singles chronology
"The Devil in I" (2014)	"Custer" (2014)	"Killpop" (2015)

"Custer" is a song by American heavy metal band Slipknot. Released on October 10, 2014, it is the third single from their fifth studio album, .5: The Gray Chapter.

== Composition ==
The song begins with Shawn Crahan "Clown" describing what the tempo of the song should be. The track then quickly transgresses into one that is much more deep and forceful, opening the composition. The song contains lead vocalist Corey Taylor speaking in the manner of a radio announcer, and the line "Cut, cut, cut me up and fuck, fuck, fuck me up". During concerts, percussionist Chris Fehn would usually sing the chorus with Corey.

== Reception ==
=== Critical response ===
Metal Hammer describes the work as having "an air of the self-titled about it with Sid's scratching in the background and almost poem-esque opening verse". ArtistDirect describes the tune as "'Surfacing 2015' with a massive refrain and Faith No More-esque groove that burns and blazes with evil and engaging panache." The Guardian praised "Custer" as well as "Sarcastrophe", noting "some huge choruses lurking within the repurposed death metal riffs and tribal clatter".

=== TikTok trend ===
In 2023, "Custer" became popular on the video sharing service TikTok. Videos on TikTok consisted of users dancing to the song with dance moves from Los Del Rio's "Macarena", among many other types of video that the song was used for.

== Charts ==
Chart performance for "Custer"
Chart (2015)	Peak position
US Mainstream Rock (Billboard)	28

== Certifications ==
Certifications for "Custer"
Region	Certification	Certified units/sales
Canada (Music Canada)	Platinum	80,000^{‡}
New Zealand (RMNZ)	Gold	15,000^{‡}
United Kingdom (BPI)	Silver	200,000^{‡}
^{‡} Sales+streaming figures based on certification alone.
