= Skeptic (song) =

Promotional single by Slipknot

from the album .5: The Gray Chapter
- Released: October 17, 2014
- Genre: Thrash metal
- Length: 4:46
- Label: Roadrunner
- Songwriters: Corey Taylor; Jim Root
- Producers: Greg Fidelman; Slipknot

"Skeptic" is a song by American heavy metal band Slipknot from their fifth studio album, .5: The Gray Chapter. The song was first released as a promo/digital single on October 17, 2014. It was the sixth promotional single and eighth overall single released from the album. The song is a tribute piece to late bassist Paul Gray who died from a drug overdose in May 2010.

== Background ==
The song was uploaded to their official YouTube channel on the same day as the Japan release of .5: The Gray Chapter on October 17, 2014. It featured original cover art.

== Critical reception ==
Loudwire stated "Today, we treat our ears to ‘Skeptic.’ Fans will automatically zone in on the track’s chorus: “The world will never see another crazy motherfucker like you / The world will never know another man as amazing as you.” Additional lyrics such as, “You were a gift,” “He was the best of us” and “I will keep your soul alive” point further toward Gray as the man referenced in ‘Skeptic." Metal Insider said "With a line like “the world will never see another crazy motherfucker like you, the world will never know another man as amazing as you,” we’re inclined to agree with that statement."

"Skeptic" was also included at number 99 on Spin magazine's list of the 101 Best Songs of 2014. Describing the song as "one of the year's most affecting love songs" that takes Slipknot "to surprisingly maudlin heights on the scream-along chorus", the magazine also noted it as "a rare unmasked moment for the enduring septet". Despite this, the review concluded that "the song is far too pulverizing to ever be considered their "Knockin' on Heaven's Door".
