= AOV (song) =

Promotional single by Slipknot

from the album .5: The Gray Chapter
- Released: October 15, 2014
- Genre: Thrash metal
- Length: 5:32
- Label: Roadrunner
- Songwriters: Jim Root; Corey Taylor
- Producers: Greg Fidelman; Slipknot

"AOV" (abbreviation of "Approaching Original Violence") is a song by American heavy metal band Slipknot from their fifth studio album .5: The Gray Chapter. The song was first released as a digital/promo single on October 15, 2014. It was the fourth promotional single and sixth overall single released for the album.

== Background ==
The song was uploaded to their official YouTube channel with a few days leading up to the release of .5: The Gray Chapter. It featured original cover art.

== Critical reception ==
Loudwire stated, "'AOV' showcases a death metal drumming style, which can be heard throughout the Slipknot tracks released so far from '.5: The Gray Chapter.' As for the voice of Corey Taylor, the man brings fury to the new track yet switches off to clean singing during the 'AOV' chorus." Metal Injection said, "As punishing as the track can be, there's a lot of counterbalance in there with some really great melodies!" Music Feeds said, "When the pre-chorus strikes Taylor gives meaning to the acronym AOV, singing "We bury what we fear the most / Approaching original violence". AOV is the sixth song the Soundwave-bound Slipknot have released ahead of dumping .5: The Gray Chapter."
