= Donnie Steele =

American guitarist (born 1971)

- Origin: Des Moines, Iowa, U.S.
- Genres: Heavy metal; nu metal; death metal
- Occupation: Musician
- Instruments: Guitar; bass
- Years active: 1993–1996; 2011–2014
- Formerly of: Slipknot

Donnie Steele is an American musician, best known as one of two original guitarists of the heavy metal band Slipknot. Steele co-founded Slipknot in 1995, performing on the band's debut demo Mate. Feed. Kill. Repeat. He left in 1996 and was replaced by Craig "133" Jones, but later rejoined in 2011 as the touring bassist following the 2010 death of Paul Gray. Steele was part of the recording sessions for the band's 2014 album .5: The Gray Chapter, but left at some point before the album was finished and was replaced by Alessandro Venturella. According to Jim Root, some of Steele's bass tracks were used for the album though he did not specify which tracks feature Steele on bass.

== Career ==
=== 1993–1997: Early career and Slipknot ===
Donnie Steele began his career as a member of Des Moines, Iowa-based death metal band Body Pit, in which fellow future Slipknot members Anders Colsefni (vocals), Mick Thomson (guitar) and Paul Gray (bass) had all performed. He later co-founded Slipknot in September 1995, alongside Colsefni, Gray, second guitarist Josh "Gnar" Brainard, drummer Joey Jordison and percussionist Shawn "Clown" Crahan. He was described by Brainard as "a pretty technical guitar player" and "one of those multi-talented guys". Author Joel McIver partly credits Steele with the introduction of jazz elements to the band's sound, describing the guitarist as a "self-confessed jazzbo".

In early 1996, after the recording of the band's debut demo Mate. Feed. Kill. Repeat., Steele began to miss a number of Slipknot rehearsal sessions. The other band members attempted to track the guitarist down, but had to continue on without him, until one of them later saw him by chance and was told that he no longer wanted to be in the group. According to Brainard, Steele "felt that playing with Slipknot was against his Christian beliefs"; the rest of the band respected the guitarist's reasons for choosing to leave, although both Brainard and Colsefni have criticised his lack of communication regarding his decision to do so. With concerts forthcoming, Steele was quickly replaced by Craig Jones who later became the band's sampler.

=== 2011–2014: Return to Slipknot ===
Following the death of Gray in May 2010, Slipknot took a brief hiatus and later announced that Steele would replace the bassist for upcoming tour dates. In an official statement, the band explained that "Donnie was in the band at the very beginning, and rather than get an outsider, we thought it would be a fitting tribute to Paul to play with someone from within the family". Speaking about his return to the band, percussionist Shawn "Clown" Crahan explained that the decision to invite Steele to replace Gray "felt completely comfortable", adding that the band was "not gonna have some jackass from another band come into our world ... Donnie's family. Donnie's from the stone of the 'Knot".

During live performances, Steele remained backstage out of sight of the crowd. Despite praising him for fitting back into Slipknot well, Crahan justified this decision by asking "What gives him the right to be onstage with us right now?", elaborating that "When we're going through an experience like this with our fans, they need to concentrate on the eight members that are grieving, not on someone new". Steele decided to leave the band during the recording sessions for ".5: The Gray Chapter", and was replaced by Alessandro Venturella in 2014, but he recorded some bass parts for the album according to guitarist Jim Root.

=== Other projects and contributions ===
Aside from Slipknot, Donnie Steele formed the death metal group Killpact in 2001 with vocalist Rick Funderburk, bassist Steve Pundzak and drummer Ernie McGinn (who had previously performed in Body Pit). In an interview with MFKR1, a website dedicated to the early incarnations of Slipknot, he described the band as "a mixture of death metal, 80's thrash and shred with a strong emphasis on hooks". In 2016, Steele made a guest appearance contributing some solos for the debut album by Des Moines-based groove metal band Murder Earth, Waiting (For the End of Man), following the departure of guitarist Ryan Thornton.

== Discography ==
with Slipknot

- Mate. Feed. Kill. Repeat. (1996)
- .5: The Gray Chapter (2014)

with Murder Earth

- Waiting (For the End of Man) (2016)

== Footnotes ==
Preceded by none	Slipknot guitarist 1995–1996	Succeeded by Craig Jones
Preceded by Paul Gray	Slipknot bassist 2011–2014	Succeeded by Alessandro Venturella
