= Alessandro Venturella =

British-Italian musician (born 1984)

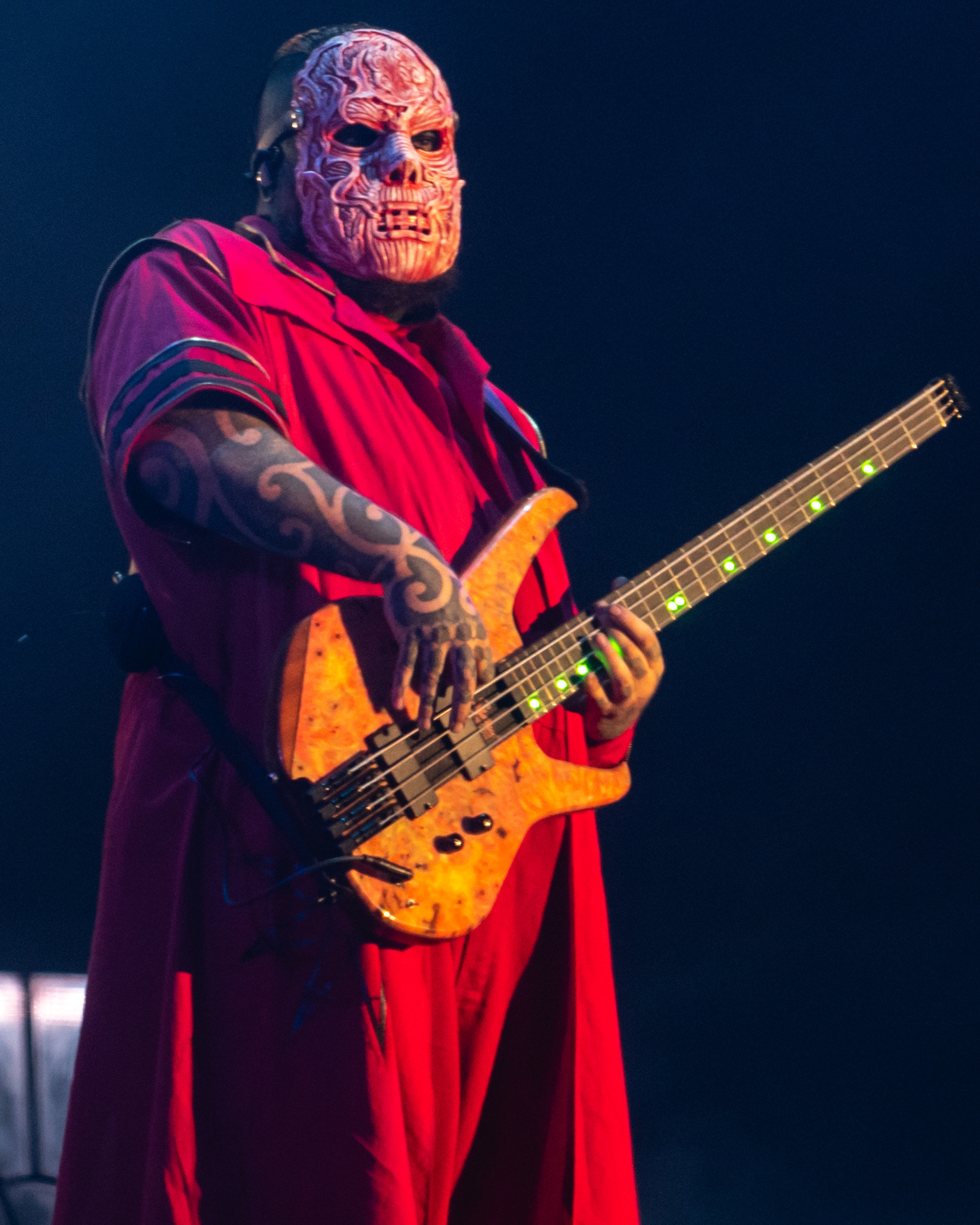
- Venturella performing with Slipknot in 2019

Background information
- Also known as: V-Man
- Born: Alessandro Giovanni Venturella; 12 April 1984 (age 42)
- Origin: England
- Genres: Heavy metal; metalcore; alternative metal; nu metal; progressive metal
- Occupations: Musician; guitar tech
- Instruments: Bass; guitar; keyboards
- Years active: 1999–present
- Member of: Slipknot
- Formerly of: Cry for Silence

Alessandro "Alex" Giovanni Venturella (born 12 April 1984) is an English musician who is the current bassist for American heavy metal band Slipknot. He previously has served as a lead guitarist for Krokodil and Cry for Silence. Earlier in his career, he was the touring guitar tech for Mastodon's Brent Hinds, Coheed and Cambria, Architects, and Fightstar.

== Slipknot ==
On 7 October 2014, frontman Corey Taylor of Slipknot was surprised by the fact that Venturella had been identified playing bass in a Slipknot video for the song "The Devil in I". Venturella's unique left-hand tattoo had been reported by Metal Chapel News, despite all the musicians wearing masks in the video. Taylor said of Venturella and the video's drummer, "They're not official band members yet, but they are people who play with the band... Time will tell whether or not they're, like, full members."

On 3 December 2014, Slipknot's former drum tech posted a photograph of a personnel list of the band on tour, showing that bassist Venturella and drummer Jay Weinberg were touring with the band. Venturella was eventually officially revealed to be the bassist by Jim Root in an interview with Ultimate-Guitar on 13 May 2015.

On 2 August 2015, Venturella had an unknown medical emergency for which he was rushed to the hospital during a show in Hartford, Connecticut. The following day, it was revealed that Venturella had suffered from dehydration during the show the previous night, and would be returning to the stage on 4 August 2015, in Mansfield, Massachusetts, where he performed backstage.

== Discography ==
with Cry for Silence

- Through The Precious Words (2001)
- The Longest Day (2004)
- The Glorious Dead (2008)

with Krokodil

- Shatter / Dead Man's Path Ltd. 7 (2014)
- Nachash (2014)

with Slipknot

- .5: The Gray Chapter (2014)
- "All Out Life" (non album single) (2018)
- We Are Not Your Kind (2019)
- The End, So Far (2022)
- Adderall (2023)

| Preceded by Donnie Steele | Slipknot bassist 2014–present | Incumbent |
