= Sarcastrophe =

Promotional single by Slipknot

from the album .5: The Gray Chapter
- Released: October 14, 2014
- Length: 5:07
- Label: Roadrunner
- Songwriters: Jim Root; Corey Taylor
- Producers: Greg Fidelman; Slipknot

"Sarcastrophe" is a song by American heavy metal band Slipknot from their fifth studio album, .5: The Gray Chapter (2014). The song was first released as a promo/digital single on October 14, 2014, the same day as the album's previous track titled "XIX". It was the third promotional single and fifth overall single released from the album.

== Background ==
The song was uploaded to their official YouTube channel with a few days leading up to the release of .5: The Gray Chapter. The song was released along with "XIX". Both featured original cover art; "XIX" became a single, while "Sarcastrophe" remained promotional.

== Critical reception ==
Radio.com described the song as "[A] thunderous track, with typically anthemic death metal roars and technical, furious percussion." Loudwire said about the song "‘Sarcastrophe’ showcases the songwriting skills Slipknot bring to their recordings. After two decades of shredding through the metal world, the band certainly understands the art of crafting both songs and albums. ‘Sarcastrophe’ could be presented as Exhibit A to back up that claim, as the new cut exposes absolutely no cracks throughout its runtime. Vocalist Corey Taylor sounds as murderous as ever, guitarists Jim Root and Mick Thomson stack layers of guitar parts filled with personality, DJ Sid Wilson scratches at just the right moments and the act's new drummer shows off his death metal chops once again with furious blasting." Music Times said "The brutal song is one more piece of evidence that Slipknot's fifth studio album is going to be one thrashing affair."
