= Eihwar =

French electronic neo-folk band

- Eihwar (Asrunn) at Motocultor 2024

Background information
- Origin: Toulouse, France
- Genres: Neo-folk; Electronic; Tribal
- Years active: 2023–present
- Label: Season of Mist
- Member of: Asrunn; Mark
- Website: www.eihwar.com

Eihwar is a French tribal electronic neo-folk musical duo, originally from Toulouse and active since 2023. The band is distinguished by a style that it calls itself "Viking War Trance", mixing tribal percussion, evocative songs and electronic rhythms inspired by Norse mythology.

== History ==
=== Origins and Emergence (2023) ===
Eihwar was founded in 2023 by two musicians who present themselves under the pseudonyms Asrunn and Mark, voluntarily preserving the anonymity of their civilian identities.. Their first track, which was uploaded to YouTube in February 2023 without any particular promotion, quickly gained notoriety. The group also made its first stage performances as part of the Witches' Night tour.

=== Season of Mist signing and debut album (2023–2024) ===
With their growing visibility, Eihwar signed with the Season of Mist label, known in particular for its catalog, including Heilung and Eivør.. On the occasion of this signing, a compilation of ten tracks, entitled Ragnarök, was released in December 2023 on streaming platforms.

The first studio album, Viking War Trance, was released on September 20, 2024, by Season of Mist. The album was entirely produced, recorded and mixed by Mark and Asrunn themselves. At the same time, the band performed at major European festivals, including Hellfest in 2024, Wacken Open Air, Resurrection Fest and Motocultor Festival..

=== Second album (2026) ===
The second studio album, Hugrheim, was released on March 13, 2026. The band is also currently continuing a headlining tour, "Nordic Ritual Nights", through Europe and the United States.

== Musical style ==
Eihwar describes their music as a fusion of Nordic folk and electronic, citing Wardruna, Heilung, Danheim and The Prodigy as some of their influences. Both members perform masked on stage, claiming an aesthetic focused on collective energy rather than individuality.

== Discography ==
Unless otherwise indicated, these albums were released by Season of Mist.

=== Studio albums ===
- 2024: Viking War Trance
- 2026: Hugrheim

=== Compilations and other releases ===
- 2023: Ragnarök
