= Midgardsblot =

Annual metal and folk music festival in Borre, Norway

- Genre: Extreme metal, folk music
- Locations: Borre, Norway
- Years active: 2015–present
- Organizer: Runa Lunde Strindin
- Website: https://www.midgardsblot.no/

Midgardsblot is an annual extreme metal and folk music festival in Borre, Norway. The festival has been organised since 2015 and takes place at Midgard Viking Centre, museum in a former Viking settlement and largest burial mound site in Northern Europe.

The programme of Midgardsblot includes tours of the area, battle reenactments, documentary screenings, lectures and panel discussions, as well as a Viking village "Fòlkvangr", a Viking market "Kaupangr" and a games arena for archery, axe-throwing, and other activities. There are daily sailings with a hand-built replica of the Viking ship Saga Oseberg, where the participants must join in rowing. The daytime lectures at the nearby museum are held by internationally recognized experts on topics such as linguistics, archaeology, cultural heritage, ancient craft techniques, and folklore.

Each year the festival begins with a blót ritual as a way for festival goers to come together. The ritual acknowledges old Norse gods, but not necessarily in a religious way. It is a way for people to get in touch with their past, connect to one another and the natural world. Individuals put their own meaning on the ceremony as they choose. The ceremony includes music, drumming, and chanting by folk music group Folket Bortafor Nordavinden and is led by Benny Braaten and Gustav «Astralseid» Holberg.

Both festivalgoers and volunteers – the latter referred to as "Einherjar" – are coming to the festival from all over the world, and the community is keeping in touch between festivals via social media groups.

== History ==
The first edition of the festival took place on August 20–22, 2015. It saw the live premiere of Einar Selvik's and Ivar Bjørnson's collaboration album "Skuggsjá". Other bands and musicians performing at the festival included Ihsahn, 1349, Myrkur, Solefald, Einherjer, Kampfar, Glittertind, and Thyrfing.

The 2020 and 2021 editions of the festival were cancelled due to the COVID-19 pandemic.

In 2022, Ym:Stammen played its first concert in 23 years at the festival. The festival had around 5,000 visitors daily in 2022.

=== 2016 (18–20 August) ===
Featured bands and artists such as: Enslaved, Ivar Bjørnson & Einar Selvik (Skuggsjá), Melechesh, Inquisition, Tsjuder, Månegarm, Skálmöld, Hamferð, Wardruna, L.E.A.F., Trollfest, Blot, Kirkebrann, Folket Bortafor Nordavinden.

=== 2017 (17–19 August) ===
Featured bands and artists such as: Týr, Sólstafir, Gaahls Wyrd, Unleashed, Aura Noir, Moonsorrow, Oranssi Pazuzu, Winterfylleth, Kari Rueslåtten, Heilung, Sahg, Tengger Cavalry, Trepaneringsritualen, Forndom, Superlynx, Virelai, Byrdi.

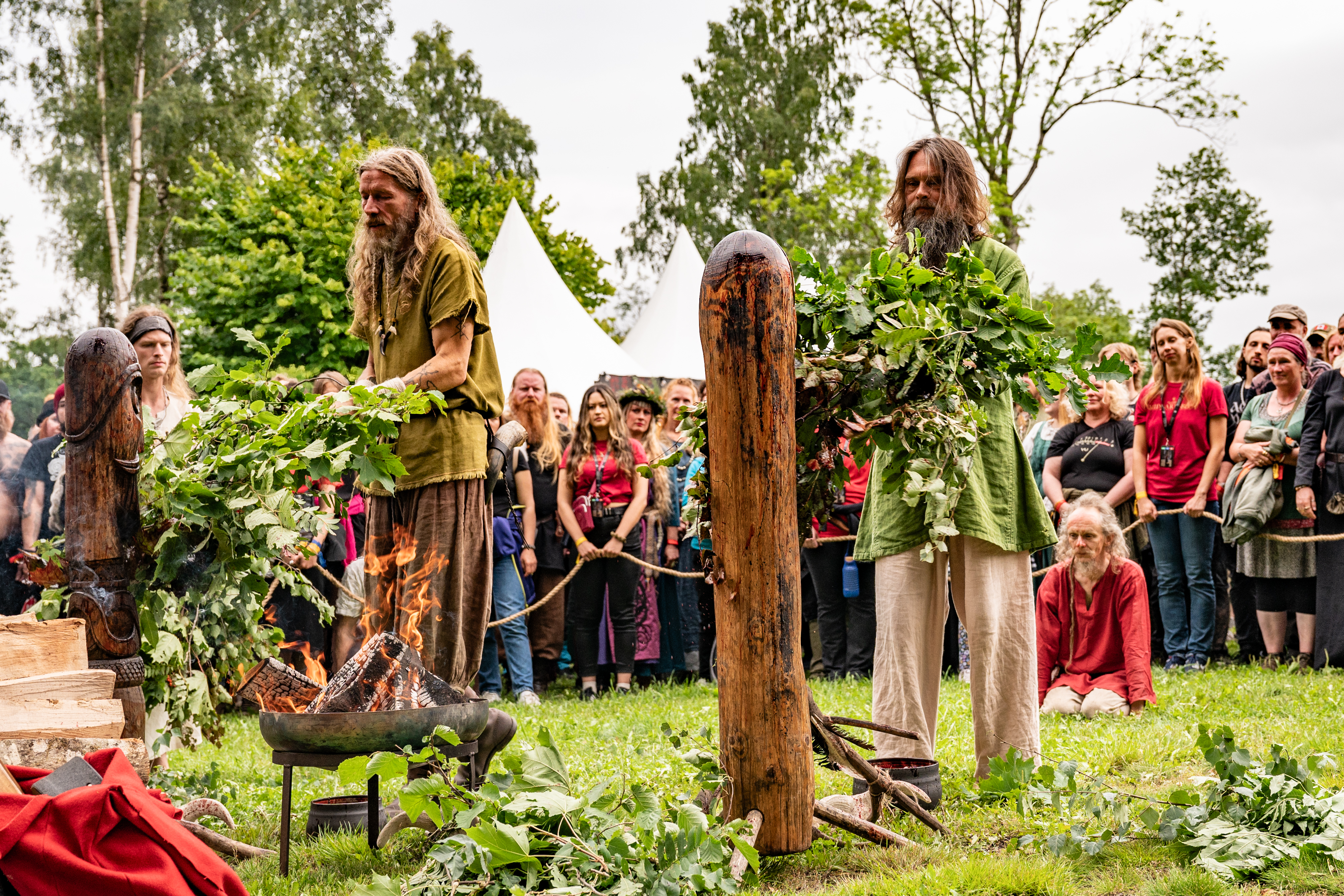
From the opening blot ceremony

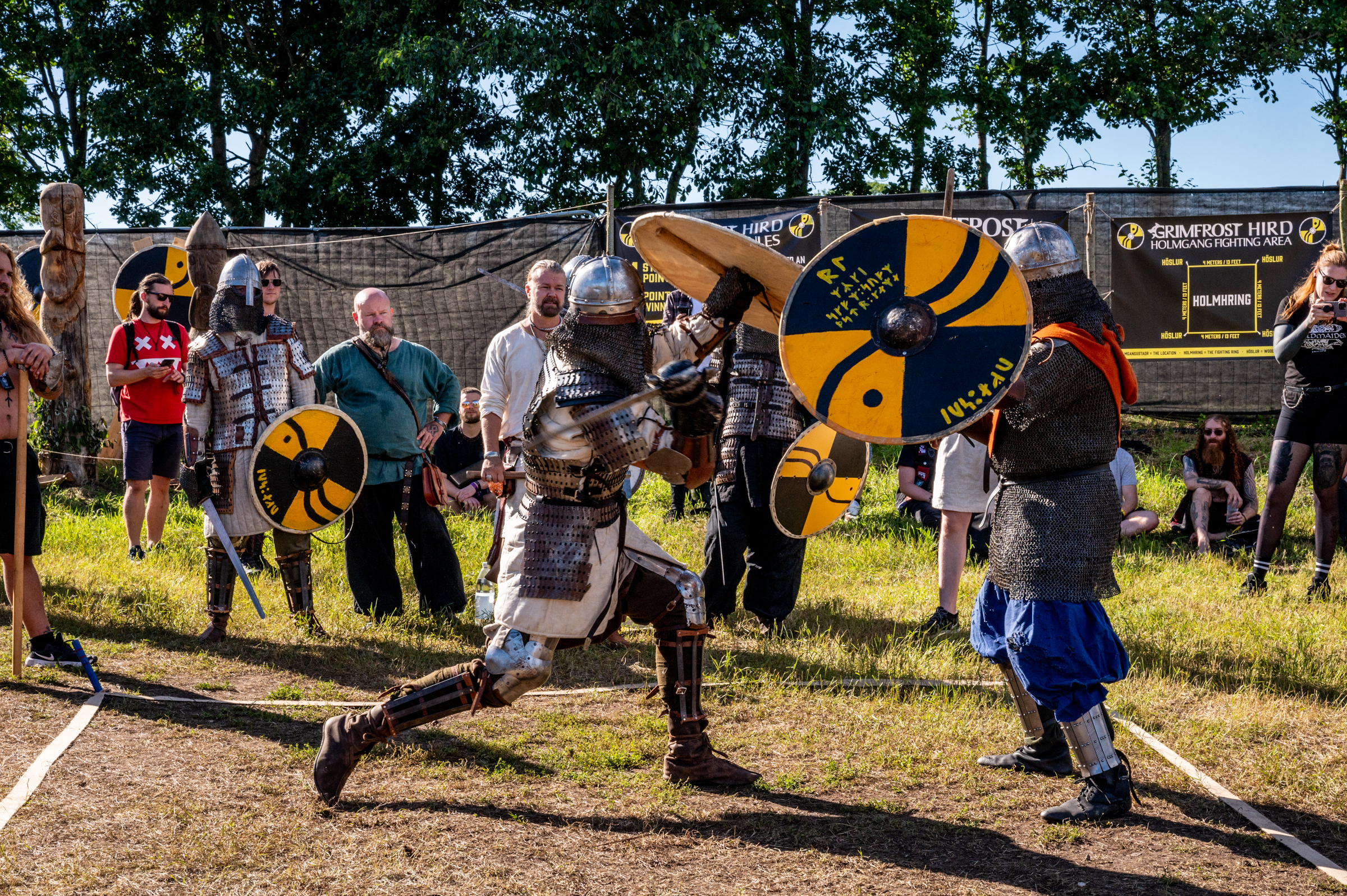
Demonstration of Holmgang

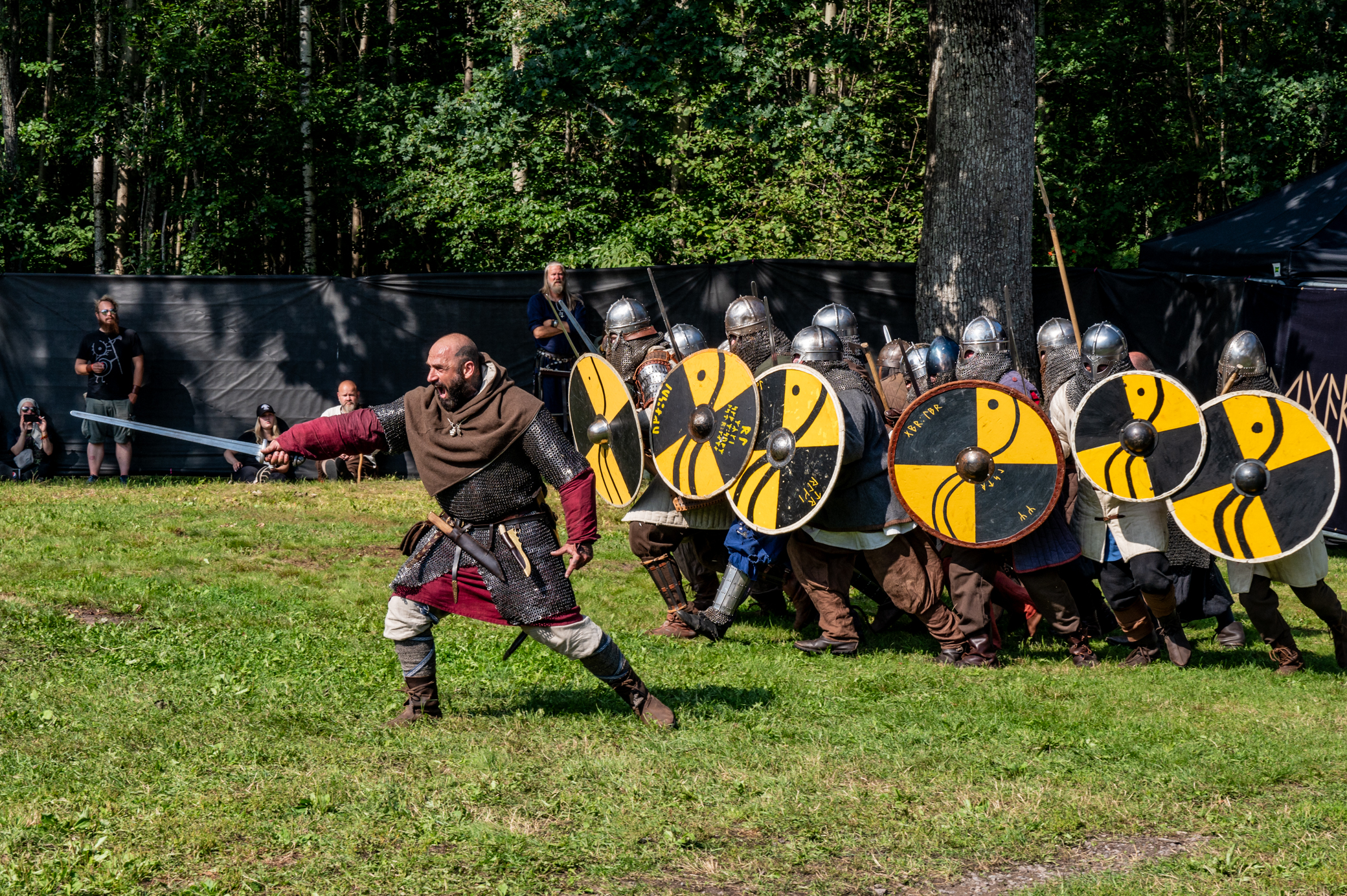
Demonstration of Skjoldborg

=== 2018 (16–18 August) ===
Featured bands and artists such as: Dimmu Borgir, Watain, Ensiferum, Rotting Christ, Garmarna, Hamferð, Årabrot, Mork, Abyssic, Saor, Grift, Folket Bortafor Nordavinden, Nytt Land, Kaunan, Darkher.

=== 2019 (15–17 August) ===
Featured bands and artists such as: Enslaved, Gåte, Ivar Bjørnson & Einar Selvik (Hugsjá, Skuggsjá), Heilung, Deicide, Gaahls Wyrd, Memoriam, Tormentor, Vreid, Einherjer, Ereb Altor, Zuriaake, Urarv, Whip, Narthraal, Folket Bortafor Nordavinden, Golden Core, Tempel, Jointhugger, Byrdi, Eldrim, Vǫluspá, Gost, Svartsinn, Treha sektori, Raison d'être.

=== 2022 (17–20 August) ===
Featured bands and artists such as: Acârash, Agabas, Astralseid, Batushka, Borknagar, Darkend, Dep, Djevel, Dødsdømt, Einherjer, Eivør, Eldrim, Endezzma, Fleshmeadow, Folket Bortafor Nordavinden, Gaerea, Heilung, Helheim, Hindarfjäll, Kalandra, Koldbrann, Konvent, Kjell Braaten, KM, Kælan Mikla, Lindy-Fay Hella & Dei Farne, Los, Lucifer's Child, Marekvist, Myrkur, Mork, Nagirčalmmiid, Nebala, Northumbria, Nytt Land, Primordial, Ragnarok, Rotting Christ, Rúnahild, Sophia, Sysselmann, The Devil & The Universe, Urgehal, Vanvidd, Vargvrede, Vǫluspá, Vomitory, Wardruna, Ym:Stammen, Zeal & Ardor.

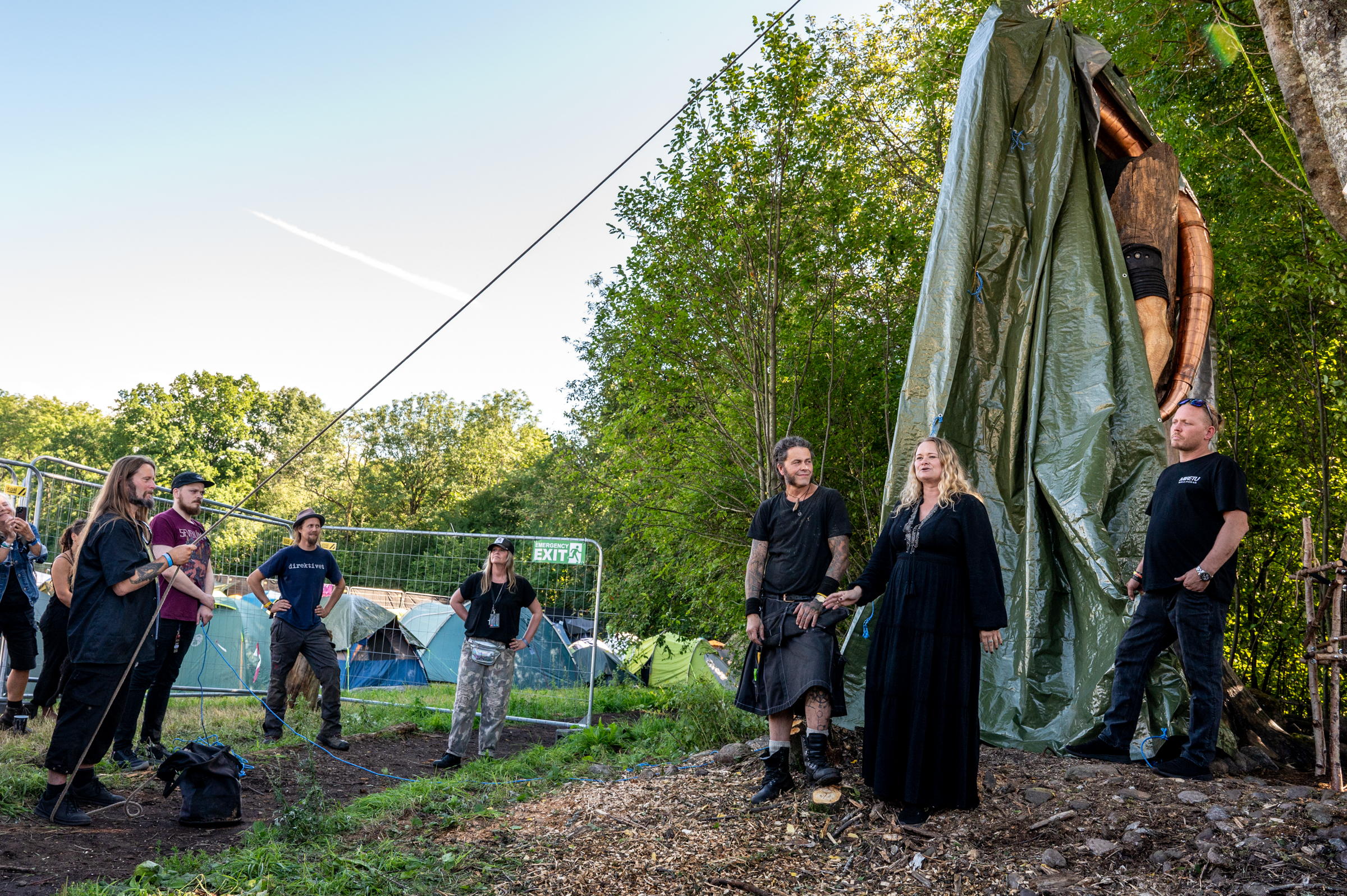
Grutle Kjellson of Enslaved unveils Stian Antonsen's (in kilt) wooden statue of Norse god Heimdall at Midgardsblot 2023

=== 2023 (16–19 August) ===
Featured bands and artists such as: Folket Bortafor Nordavinden, Finntroll, Lili Refrain, Sylvaine, Nanna Barslev, Kampfar, Nebala, Vargvrede, Wulfaz, Vǫluspá, ISÁK, Iotunn, Sowlulo, Nordjevel, Steve Von Till, Wolvenwind, Enslaved, Gangar, Katarina Barruk, Skáld, Eternity, Vevaki, Einherjer, Blackbraid, Týr, Rúnahild, Orm, Garmarna, MÍO, Frigg's Døttre, Mari Boine, Naglfar, Nemuer, Tsjuder, Mortiis, Ruun, My Dying Bride, Astralseid.

Einherjer played two different sets. One set took place in the Gildehall including live, projected painting by visual artist, Costin Chioreanu. Chioreanu is a frequent collaborator with the band, including album covers and band merchandise.

The festival included daily ritual suspension performances by Smertekirken, Church of Pain, in collaboration with Visobel Black and Morten the Maniac. Their performances were called Ritual of Resonance and Flesh.

In 2023 a carved wooden statue of Heimdall, by Stian Antonsen was unveiled on the Viking Centre grounds. This unveiling coincided with Enslaved's appearance at the festival and with their new album, Heimdal.

=== 2024 (14–17 August) ===
Featured bands and artists such as: Amon Amarth, Astralseid, Bel Canto, Brannos, Bærzerk, Deströyer 666, Dwaal, Eldrim, Emperor, Ereb Altor, Fabbrica 82, Fen, Folket Bortafor Nordavinden, Friggs Døtre, Grand Magus, Hindarfjäll, Heilung Hall (DJ set), Inculter, Johnny Hexx, Kalandra, Karin Park, Kjell Braaten, Ledfoot, Lindy-Fay Hella & Dei Farne, Lumsk, Mortal Fear, Nattverd, Nytt Land, Salige Syndere, Seigmen, Songleikr, Testament, Texas Cornflake Massacre, Trio Oro, Uada, Unleashed, Vader, Vulture Industries.

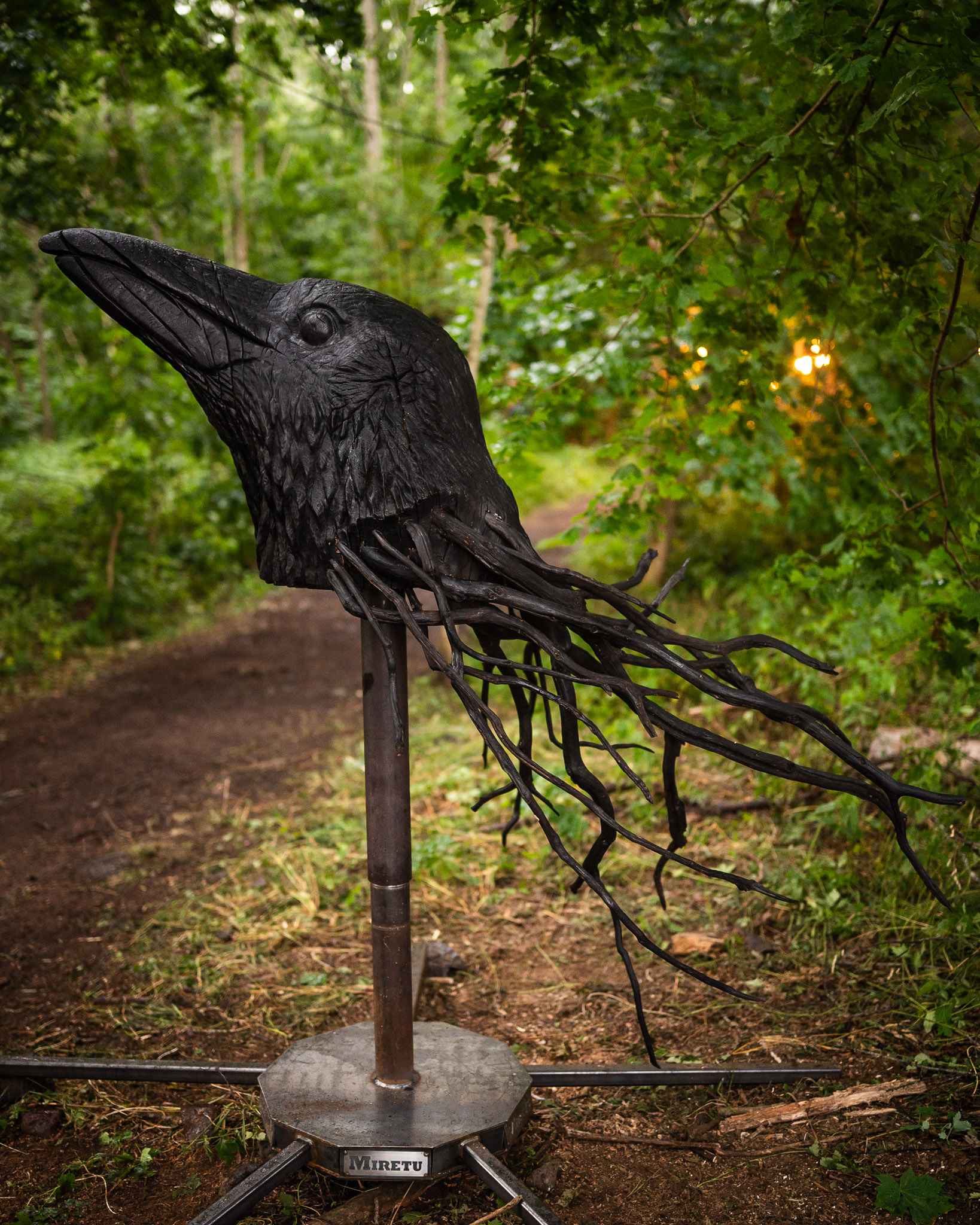
Wooden statues depiciting Norse ravens Huginn and Muninn were unveiled at Midgardsblot 2025

=== 2025 (13–16 August) ===
Featured bands and artists such as: Mayhem, Tsjuder, Eivør, Gaahls Wyrd, The 3rd and the Mortal, Ensiferum, Benediction, TNT, Stage Dolls, Hypocrisy, Svarttjern, Sylvaine (solo acoustic set), Mork, Oranssi Pazuzu, Ruïm, Eihwar, MÍO, Sigh, Hrafngrimr, Runahild, Astralseid, Nebala Liminial, Apocalypse Orchestra, Hällas, Sowulo, Jordsjuk, Iskald, Faun, Kirkebrann, Friggs Døtre, Tempel, Gudsforlatt, Congelatio, Brannos, Vanvidd, Lili Refrain, Folket Bortafor Nordavinden, Vǫluspá (two concerts), Johnny Hexx.

Arthur Brown was announced as a headliner but had to cancel due to medical reasons, and was instead scheduled for the 2026 edition of the festival.

Tsjuder did a Bathory set near the end of their gig, featuring bassist Frederick Melander. Mayhem had original members Manheim and Billy Messiah joining for the three last songs of their set. Mork had Kampfar vocalist Dolk joining them on stage.

Two carwed wooden statues of Huginn and Muninn were unveiled, to join the Heimdall statue from 2023.

In addition to the concerts there were daily fight shows by reenactor group Borrefylkingen, an extreme vocal workshop by Katarina Kjartansdatter Lembach-Beylegaard, storytelling by Tim Talesman and Jósúa Rood, shamanic workshops with Vardlokkur, daily yoga and meditation with Gui'Om, and DJ sets at night with musicians from bands such as Emperor. The opening and finishing blots were led by Folket Bortafor Nordavinden.

=== 2026 (12–15 August) ===
The festival featured bands and artists including Venom, Sólstafir, I Am Morbid, Saxon, Taake, Arthur Brown, Gehenna, Einherjer, Vreid, Skáld, Forndom, Koldbrann, Turbonegro, I, Wolves in the Throne Room, Nargaroth, Skáld, Nytt Land, Slagmaur and Backstreet Girls. Venom founding members Jeff “Mantas” Dunn and Tony “Abaddon” Bray performed together to mark the 45th anniversary of the band's debut album, Welcome to Hell.

== See also ==
- Beyond the Gates
- Hole in the Sky
- Inferno Metal Festival
