= Danheim =

Danish musician (born 1985)

- Born: Reidar Schæfer Olsen; 29 April 1985 (age 41); Brøndby, Denmark
- Genres: Ambient; electronica; Nordic folk music
- Occupations: Musician; songwriter; producer; singer
- Years active: 2016–present
- Labels: Ballista Records; Season of Mist
- Website: danheimmusic.com

Reidar Schæfer Olsen (born 29 April 1985), known professionally as Danheim, is a Danish ambient and Nordic folk musician.

== Works and style ==
Olsen was born in Brøndby in 1985 and produced mostly in the electronic genre until 2016, when a strong interest in Norse mythology led him to start combining that with his music. His stage name approximately means 'Danish home', taken from the Old Norse language word heim, meaning 'home'.

Since 2016, Danheim has released eight records on his own independent label. His style has been described by reviewers as "Brian Eno doing the soundtrack for Game of Thrones" or "inspired folk music, with dark undertones". Lyrically, his music deals with such tales from Norse mythology such as Hrungnir's fight with Thor, the story of Fimbulwinter and much more.

In his 2019 release Hringrás, Danheim recorded the last three minutes of a track using only parts of dead plants and animals, as well as some real human bones.

In 2019, Danheim also contributed music to the soundtrack of three episodes from the second half of the sixth season of the History Channel series Vikings. One of the actors from the show, Georgia Hirst, enjoyed Danheim's contributions to the score so much that she released a social media video praising his music.

As of July 2023, his YouTube channel had 555,000 subscribers and received more than 220 million video views.

In March 2020 Danheim released his third full-length album of 11 tracks, Skapanir. He decided to release the album earlier than planned, to help entertain his fans under lock-down or in isolation due to the COVID-19 pandemic. Reviewers praised the album's "visceral and hypnotic" composition, and noted the varied instrumentation that produced a "multidimensional Viking soundbath". Teemu Esko of Kaos Magazine called Skapanir "versatile and touching, while rich and immersive".

In 2025, Olsen founded FolkRealms, an online community focused on paganism, heathenry and related folk traditions.

== Discography ==
=== Albums ===
- Munarvágr (2017)
- Mannavegr (2017)
- Herja (2018)
- Friðr (2018)
- Vega (EP, 2018)
- Runagalðr (2018)
- Hringrás (2019)
- Skapanir (2020)
- Domadagr (2021)
- Heimferd (2025)

=== Singles ===
- "Munarvágr" (2017)
- "Jörmunganðr" (2017)
- "Temple of Odin" (2017)
- "Ivar's Revenge – Danish Viking Music" (2017)
- "Angrboða" (ft. Sigurboði) (2017)
- "Jörmunganðr – Vocal Version" (2017)
- "Tyr" (2017)
- "Gjallarhorn" (2017)
- "Myrkviðr" (2017)
- "Floki's Last Journey" (2017)
- "Alfaðir" (2017)
- "Ulfhednar" (2017)
- "Tyrfing" (2017)
- "Gleipnir" (ft. Fader Sol, Moder Jord) (2017)
- "Valravn" (2017)
- "Gripir" (2017)
- "War of the North" (2017)
- "Valhal – Viking War Song" (2017)
- "Berserkir" (2017)
- "Gungnir" (2018)
- "Ginnung" (2018)
- "Fornheim" (2018)
- "Vikinger" (ft. Sigurboði) (2018)
- "Vigja" (2018)
- "Vega" (2018)
- "Glitnir" (2018)
- "Fella" (2018)
- "Feikinstafir" (2018)
- "Rùnatal" (ft. Sigurboði) (2018)
- "Egilsson" (2018)
- "Heilagr Domr" (2018)
- "Hausrùnir" (ft. Sigurboði) (2018)
- "Hefna" (2019)
- "Bana" (ft. Gealdýr) (2019)
- "Reida" (2019)
- "Blodfest" (ft. Heldom) (2019)
- "Ymir" (ft. Gealdýr) (2019)
- "Niu Heimar" (2020)
- "Skylda" (2020)
- "Runamal" (2021)
- "Runar" (2021)
- "Skovblót" (2022)
- "Hel" (2022)
- "Hagalaz" (2022)
- "Valkyrier" (2022)
- "Ulvekald" (2022)
- "Brekvirki" (2022)
- "Tivar" (2022)
- "Kammergrav" (2023)
- "Langskib" (2023)
- "Heimdalsvejen" (2023)
- "Asablót" (2023)

== See also ==
- Wardruna
- Heilung
- Neofolk
- Nytt Land
- SKÁLD
