= Koldbrann =

Norwegian black metal band

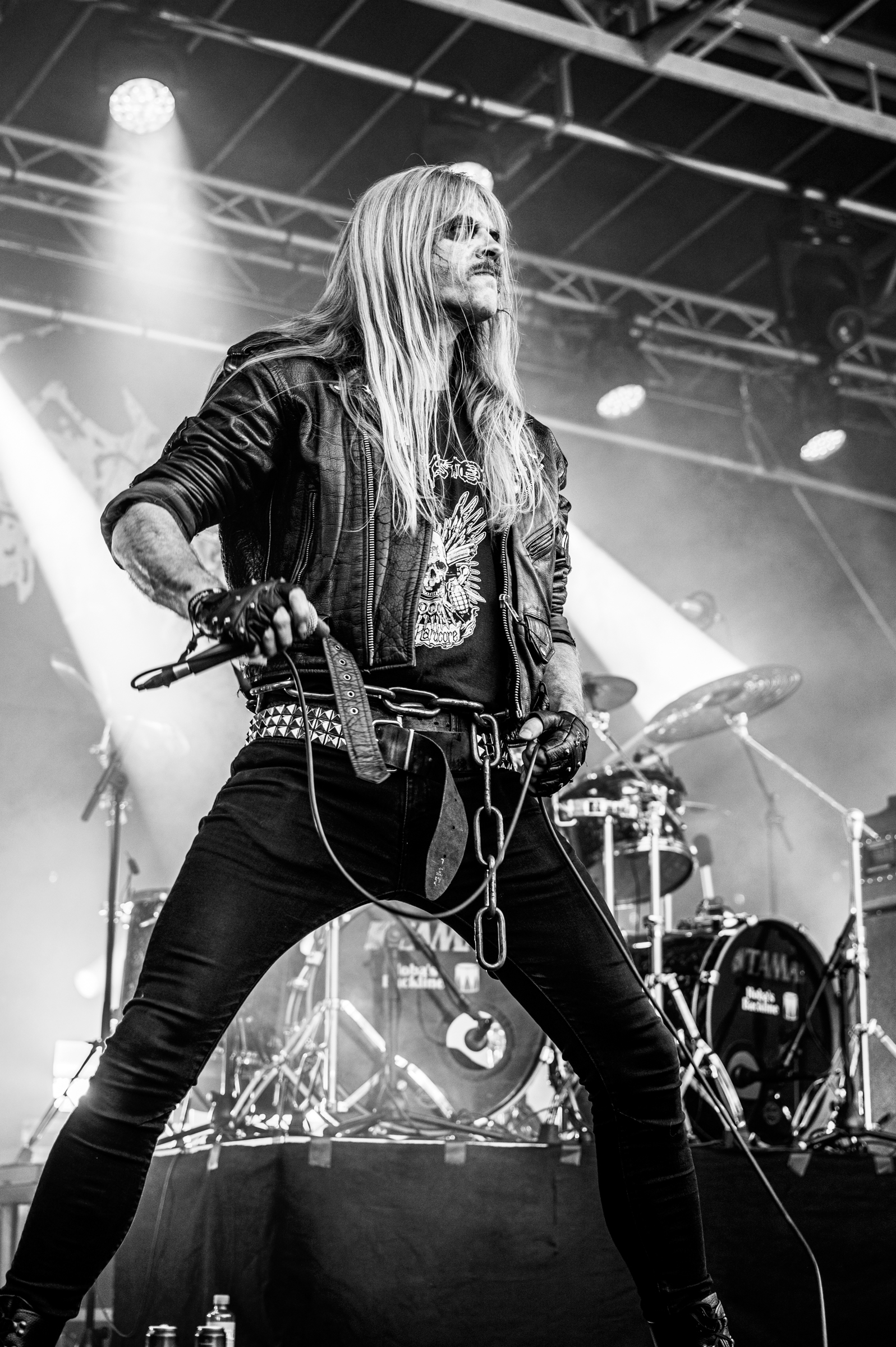
- Koldbrann at Midgardsblot 2022; Photo: Birgit Fostervold

Background information
- Origin: Drammen, Norway
- Genre: Black metal
- Years active: 2001–present
- Labels: Twilight Vertrieb, Season of Mist, Dark Essence Records
- Members: Mannevond; Kvass; Voidar; Leonid Melnikov; John Grave
- Past members: Folkedal; Stian Johnskareng; Geir Antonsen; Fordervelse; Jonas aus Slavia; Dragev
- Website: koldbrann.net

Koldbrann is a Norwegian black metal band formed in 2001.

Koldbrann play classic Norwegian black metal and have been favorably compared to Darkthrone, Dødheimsgard and Gorgoroth.

== History ==
Koldbrann was founded in 2001 by Mannevond. The first lineup consisted of Mannevond on vocals and Dragev on guitars. Dragev left the band shortly after. Mannevond recruited Kvass on guitars in 2002. As songwriter and lyricist, Kvass shaped the band's sound and has remained a key member. That year, the band enlisted drummer Fordervelse.

Koldbrann recorded and released the demo Pre-prod 2002 in July 2002. The recording featured session bassist Kjøttring, aka Seidemann of 1349 (band).

On 1 November 2022, Koldbrann live-debuted at Grotta pub in Hamar, on the underground festival Legions Of The North, with Jonas Aus Slavia on live bass. A second demo, Mislyder fra Det Nekrotiske Kammer, which consisted of a rehearsal recording, was released in December 2002.

Koldbrann released Nekrotisk Inkvisition in April 2003, coinciding with the band's performance at the Inferno Metal Festival. The album was later re-released on Desolate Landscapes, Twilight Vertrieb and Northern Silence Productions.

Following a handful of concerts in Norway, Koldbrann performed abroad in August 2003, on the Balkan Inkvisition Mini-Tour with Grenjar, with concerts in Hungary, Slovenia, Croatia, Bosnia and Herzegovina and Serbia. Bassist Stian Johnskareng had joined the band, and Geir Antonsen was enlisted as second guitarist in 2004. The following years, the band played several concerts in Norway and Europe, including the Anti-Trigger Tour 2004 with Endstille, with 11 dates in Germany and The Netherlands.

In April 2004, Koldbrann released the split 7” vinyl EP with Ljå, followed by the Atomvinter EP in January 2006.

Koldbrann's second full-length album, Moribund, was released on 23 June 2006, followed by a split 7” vinyl EP with Faustcoven, released November 2006, and the Stigma: På kant med livet mini-album, released 15 August 2008.

During 2006-2009, Koldbrann played over 70 concerts in Europe, including several tours, both headlining and supporting Taake, Marduk (band) and Shining (Swedish band), as well as festival appearances at Inferno Metal Festival (2007 and 2009), Summer Breeze Open Air (2007 and 2009), Party.San Metal Open Air (2008) and Hole in the Sky (festival) (2009).

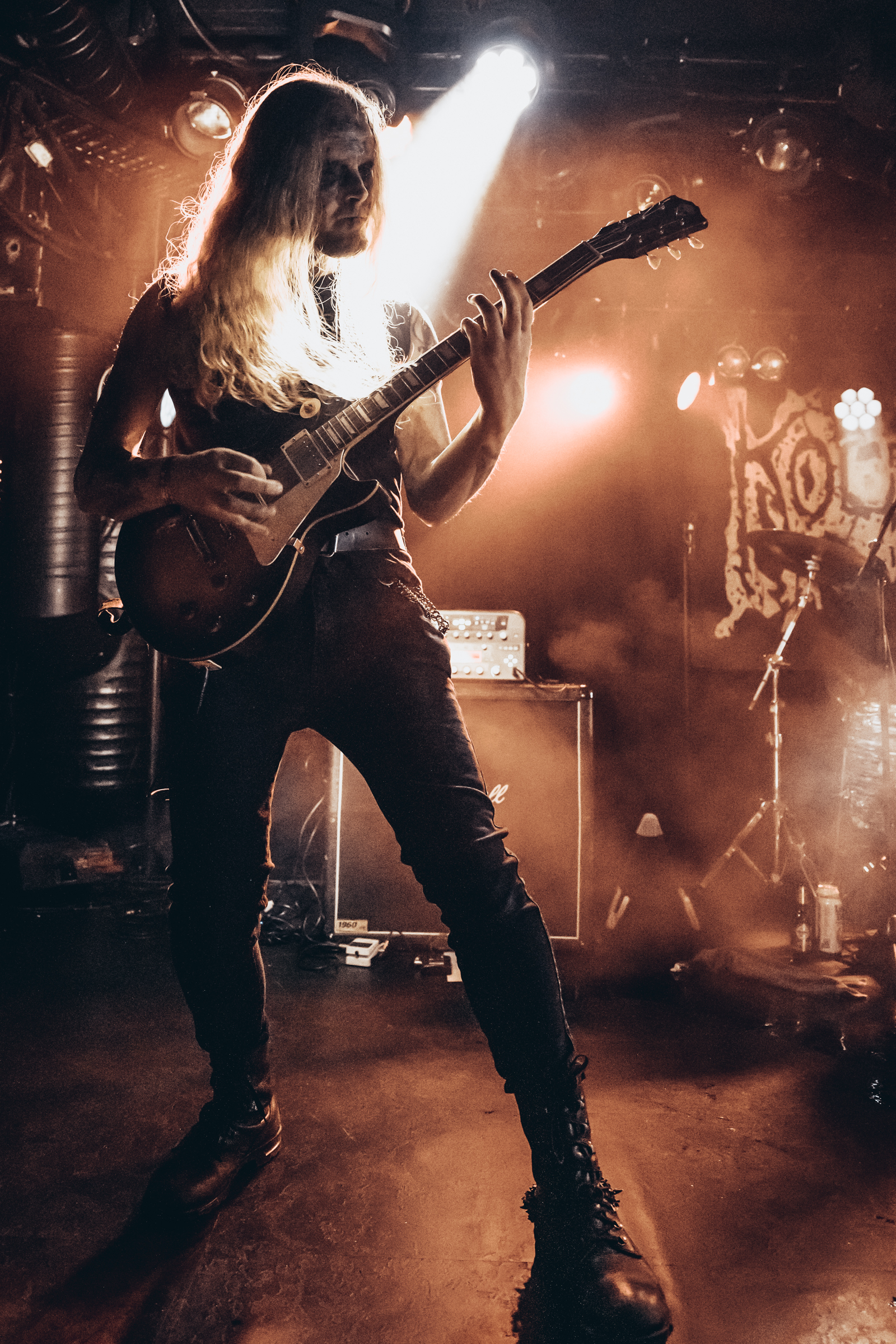
Kvass with Koldbrann at the Inferno Metal Festival, 2024 Photo: Birgit Fostervold

On 10 May 2009, Koldbrann announced they had parted ways with drummer Fordervelse, and that guitarist Geir Antonsen had left the band. Replacements were announced 13 July 2009, with Folkedal joining on drums, and Voidar joining on guitars.

After signing with Season of Mist, Koldbrann released the single "Totalt Sjelelig Bankerott" in November 2012, featuring Erlend Hjelvik of Kvelertak on guest vocals, along with the band's first music video.

Koldbrann's third full-length album, Vertigo, was released 25 January 2013. The album was album of the month in Norway's Scream Magazine, 6/7 in Metal Hammer Germany and 8/10 in Metal Hammer UK.

During 2013-2015, Koldbrann performed nearly 40 concerts in Europe, including tours with Blood Tsunami and Endstille, as well as festival appearances on, among others, Hellfest (2013), Kings Of Black Metal (2014), and Wacken Open Air (2014). In the following years, Koldbrann performed only a small number of selected concerts.

On 14 May 2021 Koldbrann announced Leonid Melnikov would play drums on an upcoming album. The band made several festival performances in 2022 and 2023, premiering new material at Midgardsblot (2022) and Wacken Open Air (2023).

After signing with Dark Essence Records, Koldbrann released the single "Den 6. Massedød (Manna fra en annen himmel)" on 1 December 2023, followed by the singles "I Unaturens Vold" and "Fortærer Av Minne Og Form", released June and July 2024.

Koldbrann's fourth full-length album, Ingen Skånsel, was released 23 August 2024. The album was awarded the Spellemannprisen 2024 in the class hard rock & metal.

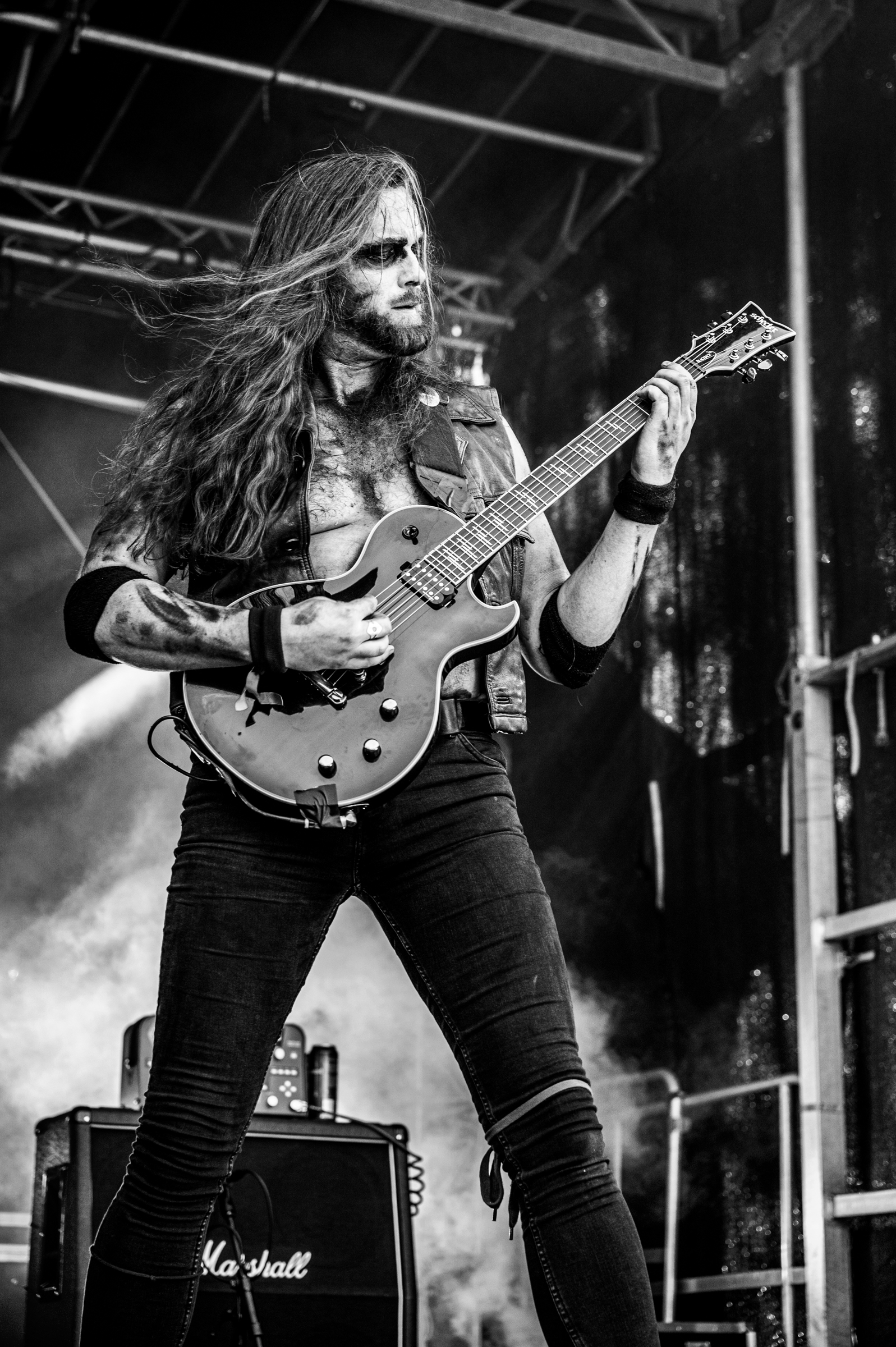
Voidar with Koldbrann at the Midgardsblot open air festival, 2022 Photo: Birgit Fostervold

In February 2025, they released the track "Elevert hinsides tilstand"—originally a bonus track on the CD version of Ingen skånsel—on streaming services as a tribute to the late Trånn Ciekals.

== Discography ==
=== Studio albums ===
- Nekrotisk Inkvisition (2003)
- Moribund (2006)
- Vertigo (2013)
- Ingen Skånsel (2024)

=== EPs ===
- Skamslåtte engler / Fredløs (2004) – split single with Ljå
- Atomvinter (2006)
- Pogrom Pestilent / Orgy in Sodom (2006) – split single with Faustcoven
- Stigma: På kant med livet (2008)
- Russian Vodka / Metalni Bog (2009)
- Totalt Sjelelig Bankerott (2012)
- Den 6. Massedød (Manna fra en annen himmel) (2023)

=== Demos ===
- Pre-Prod 2002 (2002)
- Mislyder fra Det Nekrotiske Kammer (2002) – rehearsal tape

=== DVDs ===
- Live at Ragnarök Festival 2007 (2007) – official bootleg

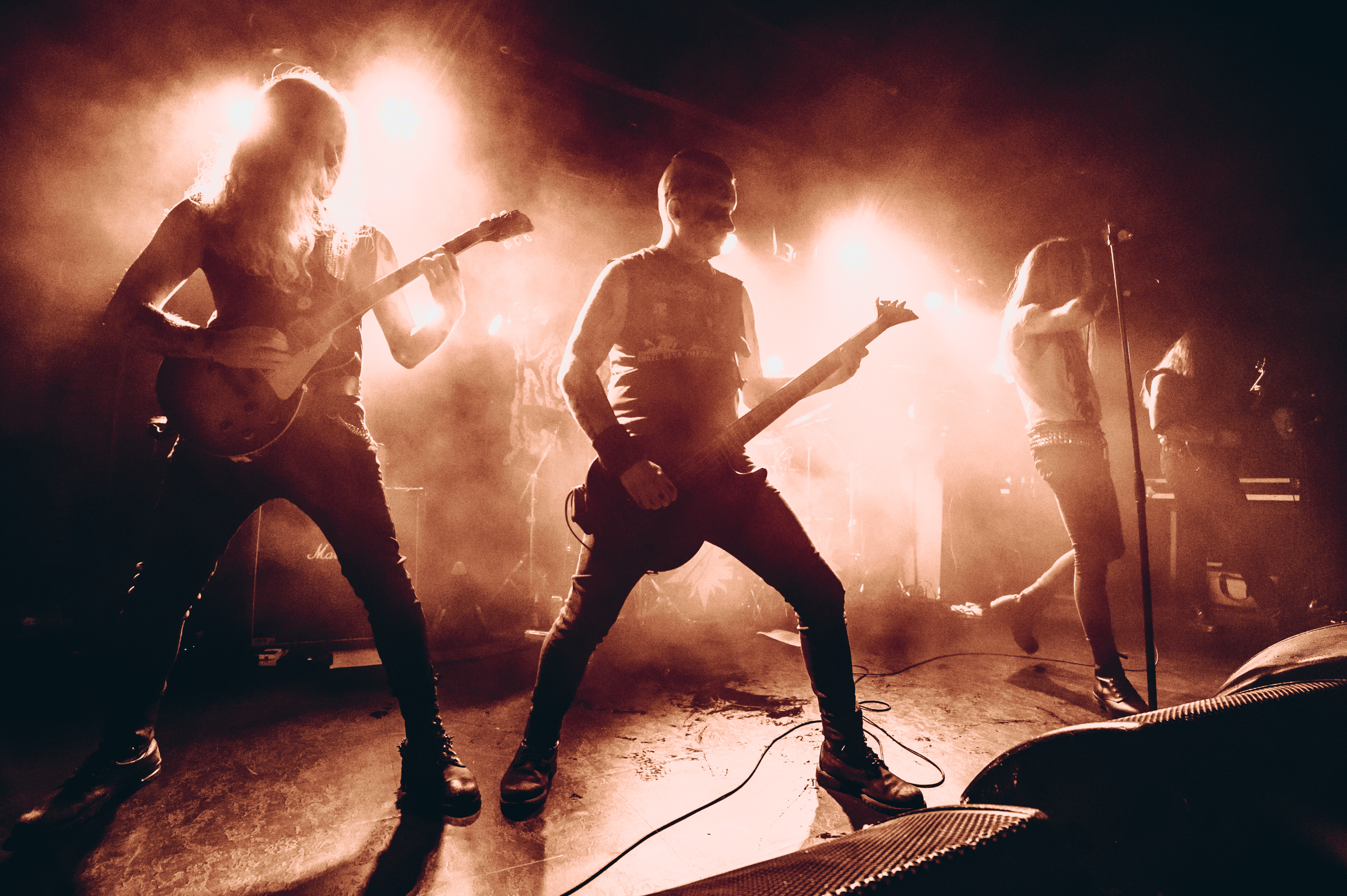
Koldbrann at the Inferno Metal Festival in Oslo, Norway, 2024. Ltr: Kvass, John Grave, Mannevond, Voidar. Leonid Melnikov on drums hidden in the smoke. Photo: Birgit Fostervold

== Band members ==
=== Current members ===
- Mannevond – vocals, bass, guitar (2001–present)
- Kvass – guitar, lyrics (2002–present)
- Voidar – guitar (2009–present)
- John Grave (aka Dragev) – live bass/guitar, additional studio guitars (2001, 2019–present)
- Leonid Melnikov – drums (2021–present)

=== Former members ===
- Jonas aus Slavia – bass (2002–2003)
- Fordervelse – drums (2002–2009)
- Geir Antonsen – guitar (2004–2009)
- Stian Johnskareng – bass (2003–2013)
- Folkedal – drums (2009–2018)

=== Live members ===
- Mpress – bass (2 shows, 2003)
- General Kshatriya – guitar (1 show, 2003)
- Kjøttring – bass (1 show, 2003)
- Kjetil Hektoen – drums (2013)
- Lars Fredrik Frøislie – synthesizers (2013-2014)
- Desecrator – bass (2014–2017)
- Malphas – bass (2014–2018)
- Eirik Renton – drums (2014-2020)
- Sturt – bass (2023–present)
- Hemsk – drums (2024–present)

== Touring history ==
- Balkan Inkvisition 2003 - 5 dates (Balkan, w/Grenjar)
- German Inkvisition 2004 - 11 dates (Europe, w/Endstille)
- Black Hordes Over Europe / Moribund Europe Tour 2006 - 10 dates (Europe, w/Sarkom and Negator)
- Moribund Balkan Tour 2006 - 5 dates (Balkan, w/KRV)
- Black Hordes Over Europe pt. II 2007 / Moribund Europe Tour pt. II - 15 dates (Europe, w/Taake and Urgehal)
- Werewolf Tour 2007 / Moribund Europe Tour Pt. III - 5 dates (Poland, w/Marduk)
- Black Hordes Over Europe pt. III 2009 / Stigma Tour 2009 - 9 dates (Europe, w/Shining (Swedish band) and Sarkom)
- Fire Walk With Me vol. 6 2013 - 4 dates (Norway, w/Blood Tsunami)
- Vertigo Over Europe 2014 - 10 dates (Europe, w/Endstille and Ondskapt)
