= Dan Larson (disambiguation) =

Daniel Larson may refer to:

- Dan Larson (born 1954), American baseball pitcher
- Dan Larson (politician), member of Minnesota Senate

== See also ==
- Daniel Larsen (disambiguation)
- Daniel Larsson (disambiguation)
