= Nytt Land =

Siberian band

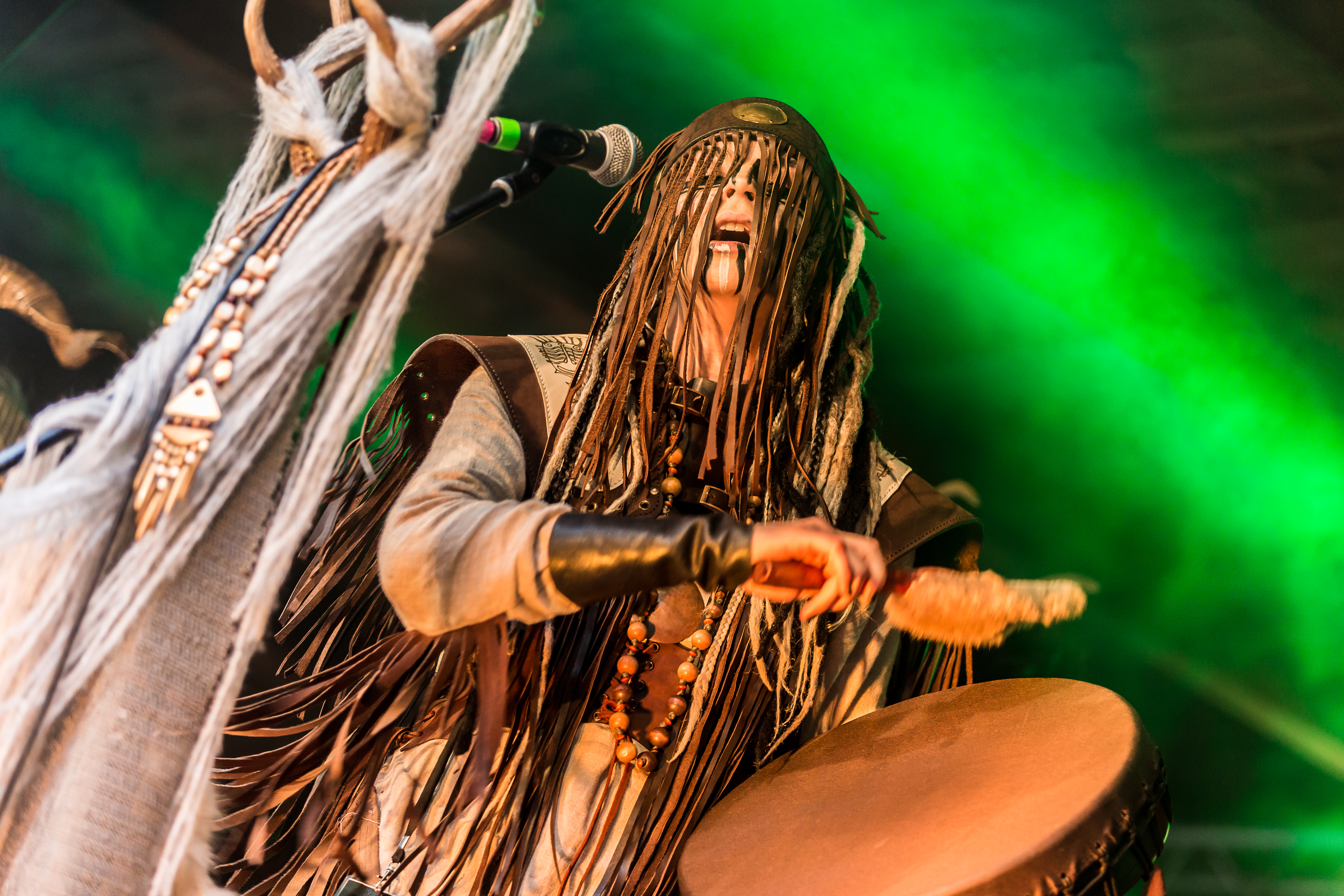
- Nytt Land at the Dark Troll festival 2025 in Germany.

Background information
- Origin: Kalachinsk, Russia
- Genre: Nordic rock
- Instruments: Tagelharpa, shaman drum, kravik lyre, jew-harp, throatsinging
- Years active: 2013 - present
- Labels: Cold Spring Records, Napalm Records
- Members: Anatoly Pakhalenko, Natalya Pakhalenko
- Website: https://nyttland.bandcamp.com/

Nytt Land are a two-piece Nordic rock band from Kalachinsk in Siberia, Russia. Started by husband and wife Anatoly and Natalya Pakhalenko in 2013, the band released their third album Fimbulvinter on Cold Spring Records in 2017.

== Style and history ==
Nytt Land formed in 2013, and released four albums independently before joining UK-based label Cold Spring Records for their 2017 release Fimbulvinter. Their subsequent album, 2018's Oðal, was also released on the label. They have supported Wardruna on their Russian concerts in 2016 and 2017, and have played at Viking, folk and metal festivals across Europe – including their debut UK show at York Barbican, as part of the York Viking Centre's Jorvik Viking Festival 2018. As of February 2019, Nytt Land's YouTube channel had accumulated a total 140,000 video views.

In August 2021, the band released their third album - Ritual - through Napalm Records. Reviewers called the album "striking, elegant and haunting" and a "transportive hallucination, wafting across the tundra". The band debuted the album with a livestreamed performance on the Napalm Records YouTube channel.

The band's style has been compared to that of Wardruna and Danheim with added traditional throat singing and handmade traditional instruments such as the Kantele and the Talharpa. The band have stated they are inspired by the sounds of Siberian nature, and their records have included live recordings of raven calls and other forest sounds. Their music has been variously described by reviewers as 'truly authentic feeling', and 'dark and mystical'. Thematically, their work echoes many stories from Norse mythology and historic texts such as the Poetic Edda. In keeping with this tradition, much of Nytt Land's lyrics are composed and sung in the Old Norse language.

== Discography ==
- 2013 - Nytt Land (self-released)
- 2015 - Havamal (self-released)
- 2016 - Scopun: Songs from the Elder Edda (self-released)
- 2017 - Fimbulvinter (Cold Spring records)
- 2018 - ODAL (Cold Spring records)
- 2020 - CVLT (self-released)
- 2020 - Ballads Of Lost Times (self-released)
- 2021 - Ritual (Napalm Records)
- 2023 - Torem

=== EP ===
- 2016 - The Last War (self-released)
- 2022 - Ritual: Blood Of The West (Napalm Records)

== See also ==
- Wardruna
- Danheim
- SKÁLD
- Heilung
