= Djevel =

Norwegian black metal band

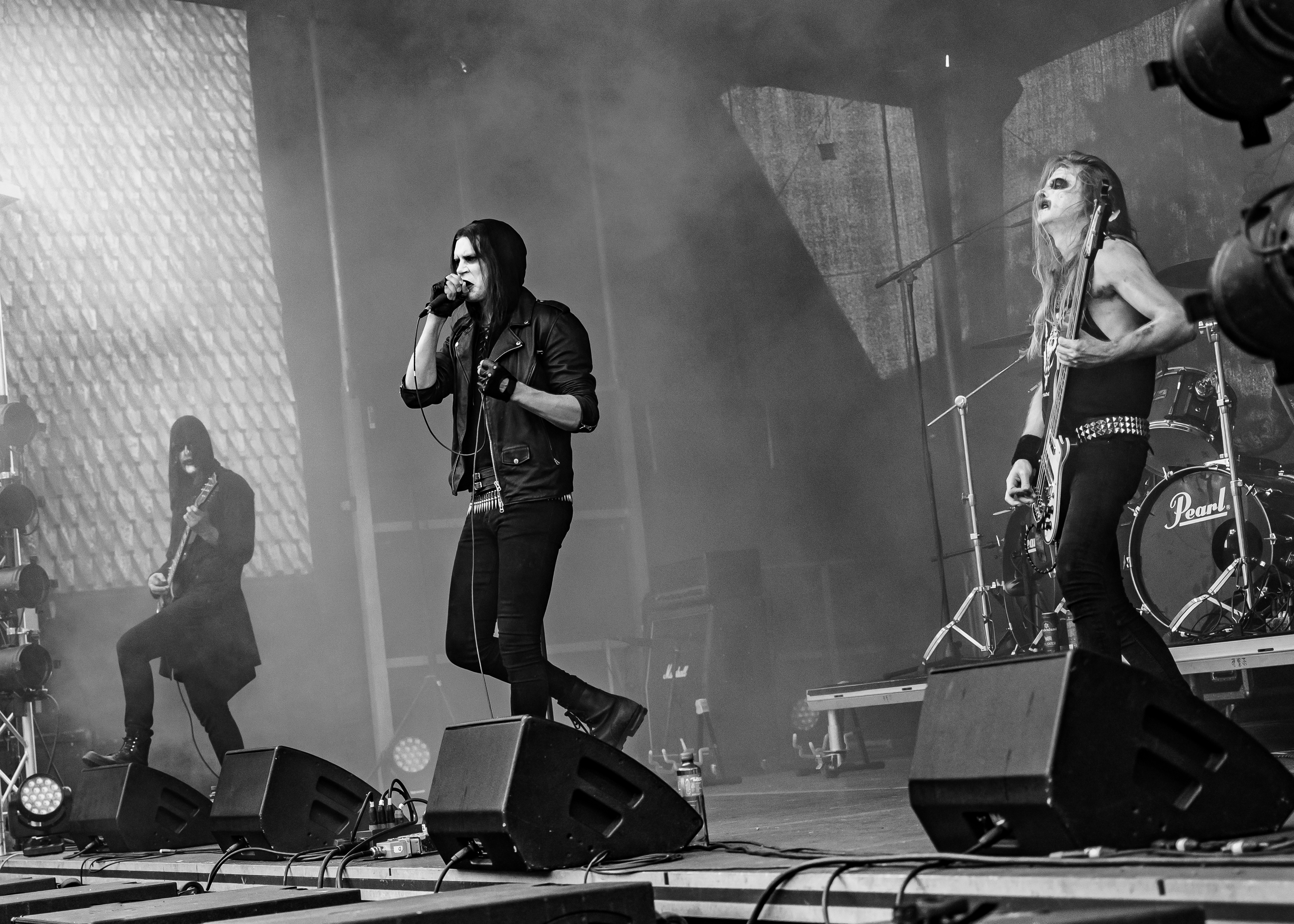
- Djevel at Midgardsblot, 2022; From left: Ciekals, Kvitrim, Mannevond

Background information
- Origin: Oslo, Norway
- Genres: Black metal
- Works: see below
- Years active: 2009 - present
- Label: Aftermath Music
- Members: see below

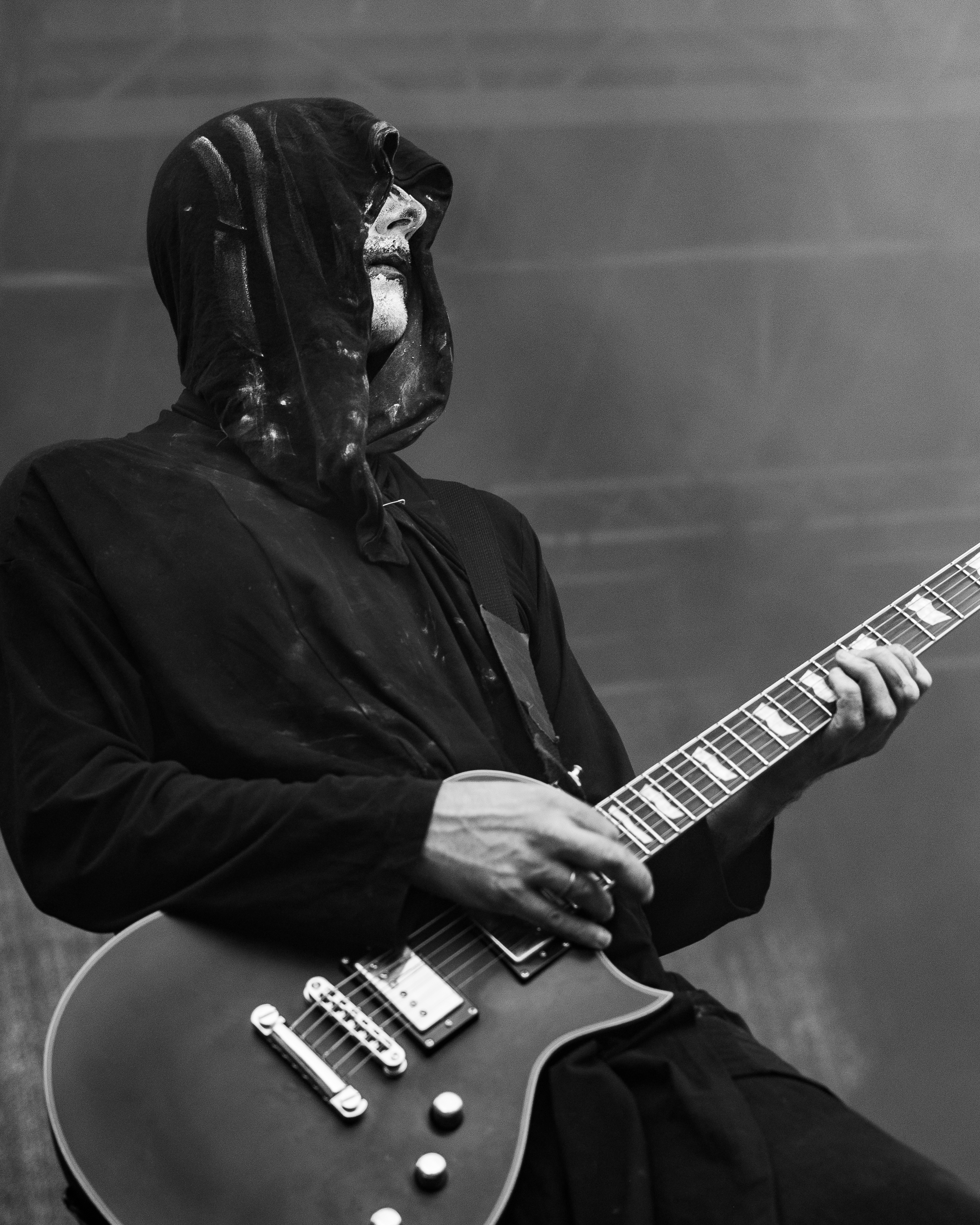
Trånn Ciekals with Djevel at Midgardsblot open air festival 2022

Djevel (en.: Devil) is a Norwegian black metal band—initially a solo project by Trånn Ciekals—active from 2009–2025.

== Biography ==
Djevel was founded in 2009 by Trånn Ciekals after he left his former band Ljå. Ciekals named the band after last song of Ljå's album Til avsky for livet (In loathing of life), titled "Gjort til Djevel" (Made a devil). Originally intended to be a solo project, it became a full band after Erlend Hjelvik and Lloyd "Mannevond" Hektoen joining in 2011.

Djevel released their first album Dødssanger (Songs of death) on 13 June 2011. Anders "Hjorth" Mosness played the drums on it as a session member.

In 2012, Per "Dirge Rep" Håvarstein (Gehenna, Enslaved) joined the band as a full-time drummer. Djevel released Besatt av maane og natt (Possessed by moon and night) on 14 June 2013, Saa raa og kald (So raw and cold) on 29 April 2015 and Norske ritualer (Norwegian rituals) on 11 November 2016. The third track of Norske ritualer included a guest appearance on vocals by Ørjan "Hoest" Stedjeberg and was recorded by Eirik "Pytten" Hundvin.

In 2017, vocalist Hjelvik and drummer Dirge Rep left the band. Bassist Mannevond started doing the vocals, and Bård "Faust" Eithun replaced Dirge Rep.

Djevel released their fifth album Blant svarte graner (Among the black spruces)—a concept album about Black Death—on 23 March 2018. It was followed by the EP Vettehymner (Hymns of the wights), which included acoustic guitar versions of 5 early songs and one new song played by Ciekals, and the full-length album Ormer til armer, maane til hode (Arms of serpents, head of moon), which was released on 18 October 2019.

In 2020, vocalist and bass player Mannevond left the band to focus on Koldbrann, and was replaced by Eskil "Kvitrim" Blix. Mannevond returned to the band following year as a live member on bass, and ultimately left in 2024.

Djevel released Tanker som rir natten (Thoughts that haunt the night) on 14 May 2021, Naa skrider natten sort (Now the black night advances) on 23 November 2022 and Natt til ende (Night to the end) on 15 November 2024. These albums form a night-themed trilogy. The band played at Prague Death Mass during the interim in 2023.

=== Ciekals dies, band dissolves, a final album (2025) ===
Trånn Ciekals died on 7 February 2025 from unknown causes. In March, the band announced they will perform the planned two gigs on 21 and 22 November in the Oslo venue Parkteatret, "as a tribute to the life and musical work of Trånn Ciekals", with Jan Even Åsli replacing Ciekals on guitar. They later added a gig in Trondheim on 8 November. Ciekals' wife, musician Alina "Lamia Vox" Antonova, played alongside Djevel on the two Oslo gigs, performing music made by her and Ciekals under the project name Høstkvæld (autumn evening). Håvard Jørgensen, formative member of Ulver, performed on the second night. The band stated "this will be the last chance to see Djevel ever".

At the time of Ciekals' death, he had material for two more albums written but not recorded. In August 2025, the remaining band members announced that there will be a tenth and final album with this material. The release date is expected to be around late 2026-early 2027 and the title is expected to be En tid for alt.

== Style ==
Stylistically, Djevel is close to the 1990s Norwegian wave of black metal, and reviewers often highlighted how the band succeeded in capturing that cold black metal sound. Ciekals considered himself a purist when it came to black metal and was highly critical of bands that mixed in other genres or stylistic elements.

— I haven’t incorporated new styles since I started in 1992. I have certain views on how our expression should be, which I adhere to quite strictly. I compose everything on classical guitar. (Ciekals, 2018)

The lyrics are in Norwegian, with themes such as old Norwegian pagan and devilish rituals and the Black Death. The song titles are written in an old Norwegian spelling style.

The albums' cover art is created by artists Truls Espedal and Danny Larsen, with input on the use of symbols from Ciekals and Dirge Rep.

== Awards and nominations ==
- 2021: Spellemannprisen win in the Metal category for Tanker som rir natten
- 2023: Edvardprisen nomination for Trånn Ciekals for Naa skrider natten sort

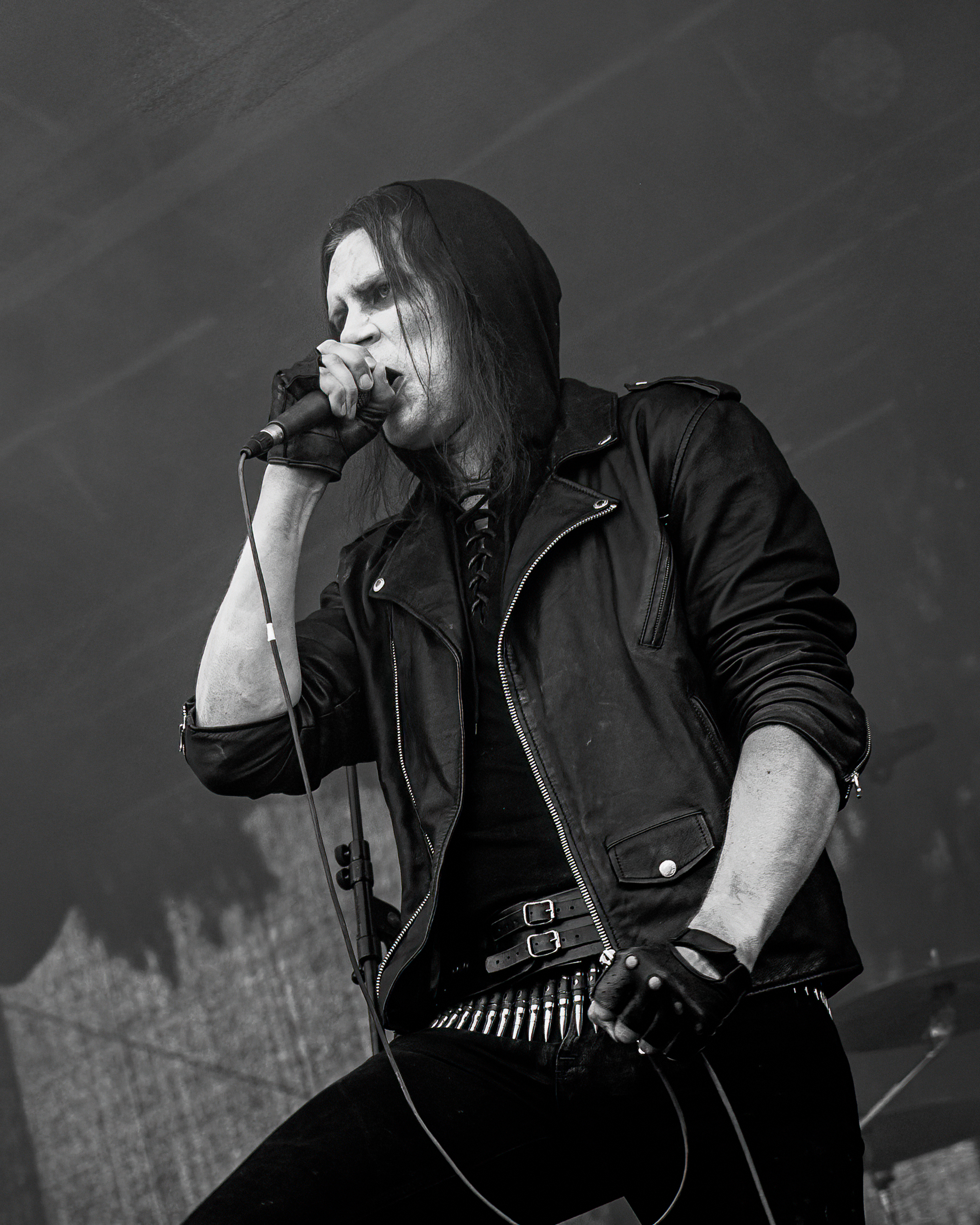
Kvitrim with Djevel at Midgardsblot open air festival 2022

== Members ==
- Trånn Ciekals: Guitars, vocals, songwriting, lyrics (2009–2025)
- Kvitrim: Vocals, bass (2020–present)
- Faust: Drums (2017–present)

=== Past members ===
- Erlend Hjelvik: Vocals (2011–2017)
- Mannevond: Bass (2011–2020), harsh vocals (2017–2020)
- Dirge Rep: Drums (2012–2017)

=== Live members ===
- Nosophoros: Guitars (2020–present)
- Jon Bakker: Bass (2024–present)
- Izare: Keyboards (2023–present)

=== Past live members ===
- Ruben Willem: Guitars (2012–2015)
- Pete Evil: Guitars (2016)
- Voidar: Guitars (2017–2020)
- Sindre Solem: Bass (2018–?)
- Eirik Renton: Drums (2018)
- John Grave: Bass (2019–2020)
- Mannevond: Bass (2021–2024)

== Discography ==
- 2011: Dødssanger
- 2012: Besatt av maane og natt (EP)
- 2013: Besatt av maane og natt
- 2015: Saa raa og kald
- 2016: Norske ritualer
- 2018: Blant svarte graner
- 2018: Vettehymner (EP)
- 2019: Ormer til armer, maane til hode
- 2021: Tanker som rir natten
- 2022: Naa skrider natten sort
- 2024: Natt til ende
