= Ofnir =

Ofnir may refer to:

- Ófnir, one of the names of the Germanic god Odin
- Ofnir, the 2015 debut album of European folk band Heilung
- Sir Gideon Ofnir, character from the video game Elden Ring
