= Daniel Larsen =

Daniel Larsen may refer to:

- Daniel Larsen Schevig (1786–1833), Norwegian military officer and constitutional founding father
- Daniel Larsen (mathematician), American mathematician
- Danny Larsen, Norwegian snowboarder
- Daniel Larsen, a magician that participated in the first season of Norske Talenter
- Daniel Larsen, drummer in Dominus (band)

== See also ==
- Daniel Larsson (disambiguation)
- Daniel Larson, baseball player
