= Emancer =

Norwegian black metal band

Emancer is a Norwegian black metal band from Luster in Sogn, formed in 1996. Initially known as Utumno, the band changed to Emancer in 2000, shortly before releasing their debut. Emancer's style has evolved from traditional black metal to progressive black metal. The band has released five studio albums, garnering a cult following in the extreme metal underground and positive reviews in the Norwegian and international metal press.

== Style ==
Emancer blends the speed and aggression of black metal with other genres. Author and heavy metal commentator Jeff Wagner noted in his 2010 book Mean Deviation: Four Decades of Progressive Heavy Metal, that the band had “...loads of ability and an interesting sound” reminiscent of Enslaved.

== History ==
Emancer was formed in 1996 by guitarist/programmer Ole Hartvigsen (as “Mithrin”), vocalist Kjell J. Heltne (as “Gorbag”), and a guitarist known as “X”. As Utumno, the group recorded two demos in 1997 and 1998. In 2000, they adopted the name Emancer and signed with Extremist Records. Emancer's debut album, Utopian Illusions, was released in late 2001 The album featured atmospheric black metal rooted in the band's demo sound.

A year later, the band's second album, The Human Experiment (2003), came out on Black Owl Records, showcasing a broader musical approach with industrial elements. These early releases had a modest impact. “X” left the band after the debut.

Invisible, released in 2004 on Golden Lake Productions, incorporating progressive and experimental influences. The songs on Invisible blend fast black metal with brutal death metal, prog rock, electronic beats, and Opeth-like acoustic passages

The band's fourth album, The Menace Within, was released in 2005 via Golden Lake. This record continued the progression toward avant-garde extreme metal. Songs on The Menace Within feature dynamic shifts between aggressive black metal riffs and melodic or atmospheric passages, integrating clean vocals and synthesizers.

After three years of writing and recording, Emancer released Twilight and Randomness in 2008 through Naga Productions. The mastering was handled by Tom Kvlsvoll, who had worked with Windir and Emperor.

In October 2010, Emancer embarked on their first European tour, supporting Austrian black/death metal band Belphegor and Vreid on the “Walpurgis Rites – Raid Europa 2010. The tour included 15 concerts across Germany, Eastern Europe, France, Spain and Belgium. The live lineup for this tour was vocalist Kjell Jomar Heltne (Gorbag- who also sang with Cage of Torment), guitarist Ole Hartvigsen (Mithrin), bassist Bjarte Breilid, drummer Thomas Myklebust, and keyboardist Kristin Myklebust.

A new album was in the works following the tour, with recording planned to be completed by winter 2010–2011. As of 2025, no album was released. Several members turned to other projects. Ole Hartvigsen and Thomas Myklebust joined Sogndal-based black metal band Mistur in 2009–2010, and Hartvigsen later became a live guitarist for Kampfar. Emancer has not officially announced a breakup, but the band has not recorded or performed since 2010.

== Members ==
=== Current ===
- Ole Hartvigsen (“Mithrin”) – guitars, bass, programming, backing vocals (1996–present)
- Kjell Jomar Heltne (“Gorbag”) – lead vocals (1996–present)
- Thomas Mjånes Myklebust – drums (2007–present; live member)
- Kristin Mjånes Myklebust – keyboards, backing vocals (2007–present; live member)
- Bjarte Breilid – bass (2008–present; live member)
- André Raunehaug – guitars (2009–present; live member)

=== Former ===
- “X” (Morgoth) – guitars (1996–2001)
- Helstein – clean vocals, guitars (2004–2008)

== Discography ==
- Utopian Illusions (2001, Extremist Records)
- The Human Experiment (2003, Black Owl Records)
- Invisible (2004, Golden Lake Productions)
- The Menace Within (2005, Golden Lake Productions)
- Twilight and Randomness (2008, Naga Productions)
