= Blackbraid =

American black metal band

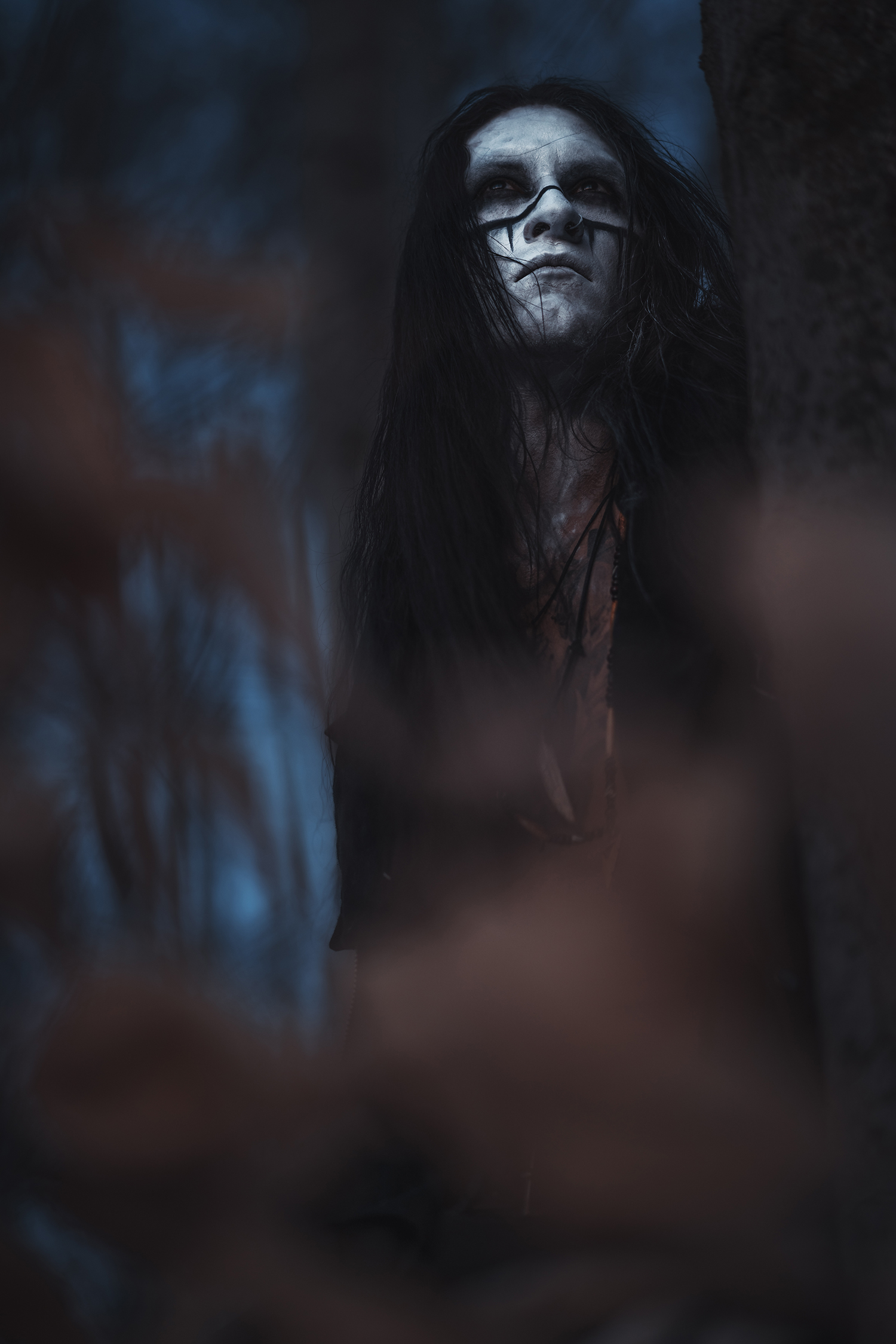

Background information
- Origin: Adirondack Mountains, U.S.
- Genre: Black metal
- Years active: 2022–present
- Label: Independent
- Members: Sgah’gahsowáh (Jon Krieger)
- Website: blackbraid.us blackbraid.eu

Blackbraid is an American black metal solo project formed in the Adirondack Mountains, New York, in 2022 by Jon Krieger. A native American, Krieger is also known as Sgah’gahsowáh, a Mohawk name meaning "the witch hawk".

== History ==
Blackbraid was formed in 2022 as part of the indigenous black metal scene in the United States. Some commentators have doubted Krieger's ties to the Mohawk tribe (the source of his stage name) though he has confirmed his Native American roots. Krieger was a lifelong musician and had been involved informally with friends' projects, but Blackbraid is his first solo project. The first single released as Blackbraid was "Barefoot Ghost Dance on Blood Soaked Soil".

The debut album Blackbraid I was released in August 2022. Krieger, a multi-instrumentalist, wrote and performed the album except drums, which were played by Neil Schneider. The cover art was created by Adrian Baxter. The album melds conventional black metal with indigenous music, such as the Native American flute, and acoustic interludes. The album was released to general critical acclaim, featuring on Rolling Stone's Best Metal Albums of 2022 list, Metal Injection's list of best underground metal albums of 2022, and Decibel's Top 40 Albums of 2022 list. Following its independent release on Bandcamp, it was named one of the site's best metal releases for August 2022.

Krieger assembled a backing band for live performances, and Blackbraid embarked on its first tour in spring 2023, as part of the Decibel Magazine Tour (presented by Metal Blade Records) with Dark Funeral, Cattle Decapitation, and 200 Stab Wounds. After headlining a show at the Midgardsblot festival in Norway in August 2023, Blackbraid was reportedly asked to leave the festival due to alcohol intoxication, spitting at a security guard, and causing a disturbance. Krieger alleged racism, but later admitted that the "situation was handled poorly on all sides."

Krieger stated that the second Blackbraid album would incorporate more native instrumentation. Blackbraid II was released in July 2023. Krieger further developed the project's sound on the third album, combining Native American instrumentation with alternating heavy and atmospheric moods, with a continuing lyrical focus on Native American history. Blackbraid III was released in August 2025.

== Influences ==
Musically, Krieger has cited Dissection, Gorgoroth, Satyricon, Opeth, Enslaved, Wolves in the Throne Room, Panopticon, Immortal, Bathory, and Mayhem as influences.

Lyrically, Krieger deals primarily with the themes of Native American history and connection to nature. Blackbraid I contains lyrics referring to genocide of indigenous peoples; of the track "Barefoot Ghost Dance on Blood Soaked Soil", Krieger said, "This song is about the suffering and genocide of my people all across these continents, and our resistance to it. I think in my head I was loosely writing about the Wounded Knee Massacre when I started but it quickly evolved into something much broader. It is definitely a war song." The single's cover art features American photographer Edward Curtis's 1908 photo "Sun dance pledgers--Cheyenne".

However, Krieger has also been clear that Blackbraid is primarily an emotional outlet for him, saying, "I think music can be a powerful weapon no matter how it is used. Obviously, I would like to see strides towards decolonization made, but when it comes to Blackbraid, the project is largely just an outlet for my own emotions and is not politically oriented whatsoever." Krieger has stated that Blackbraid's lyrics are "anti-Christian in nature," but "also not really about Satan."

Krieger views Blackbraid as a project that can help listeners reconnect with nature and help him explore his own relationship with nature: "For some Indigenous people, they think nature is ours, but I think it belongs to everyone, though Indigenous Americans really do seem to be more connected with it...And it doesn’t take much to enjoy nature. You just need to open your eyes. You're already connected; you’re just actively ignoring that connection. I think with Blackbraid, that’s really what I want the music to do. I don’t really need to educate people because they already know it's there; they've just forgotten, and I want Blackbraid to kind of reawaken things they may not think about every day."

== Discography ==
=== Studio albums ===
- Blackbraid I (2022)
- Blackbraid II (2023)
- Blackbraid III (2025)

=== EPs ===
- Nocturnal Womb (2026)

=== Singles ===
- "Barefoot Ghost Dance on Blood Soaked Soil" (2022)
- "Warriors" (2024)
- "The Dying Breath of a Sacred Stag" (2025)

=== Music videos ===
List of music videos, showing year released and director
| Year | Title | Album | Director(s) |
|---|---|---|---|
| 2022 | "Sacandaga" | Blackbraid I | |
| 2023 | "The Spirit Returns" | Blackbraid II | |
| 2025 | "Wardrums at Dawn on the Day of My Death" | Blackbraid III | Moshmallows |
| 2025 | "The Dying Breath of a Sacred Stag" | Blackbraid III | Wolf Mountain Productions |
