= Endstille =

German black metal band

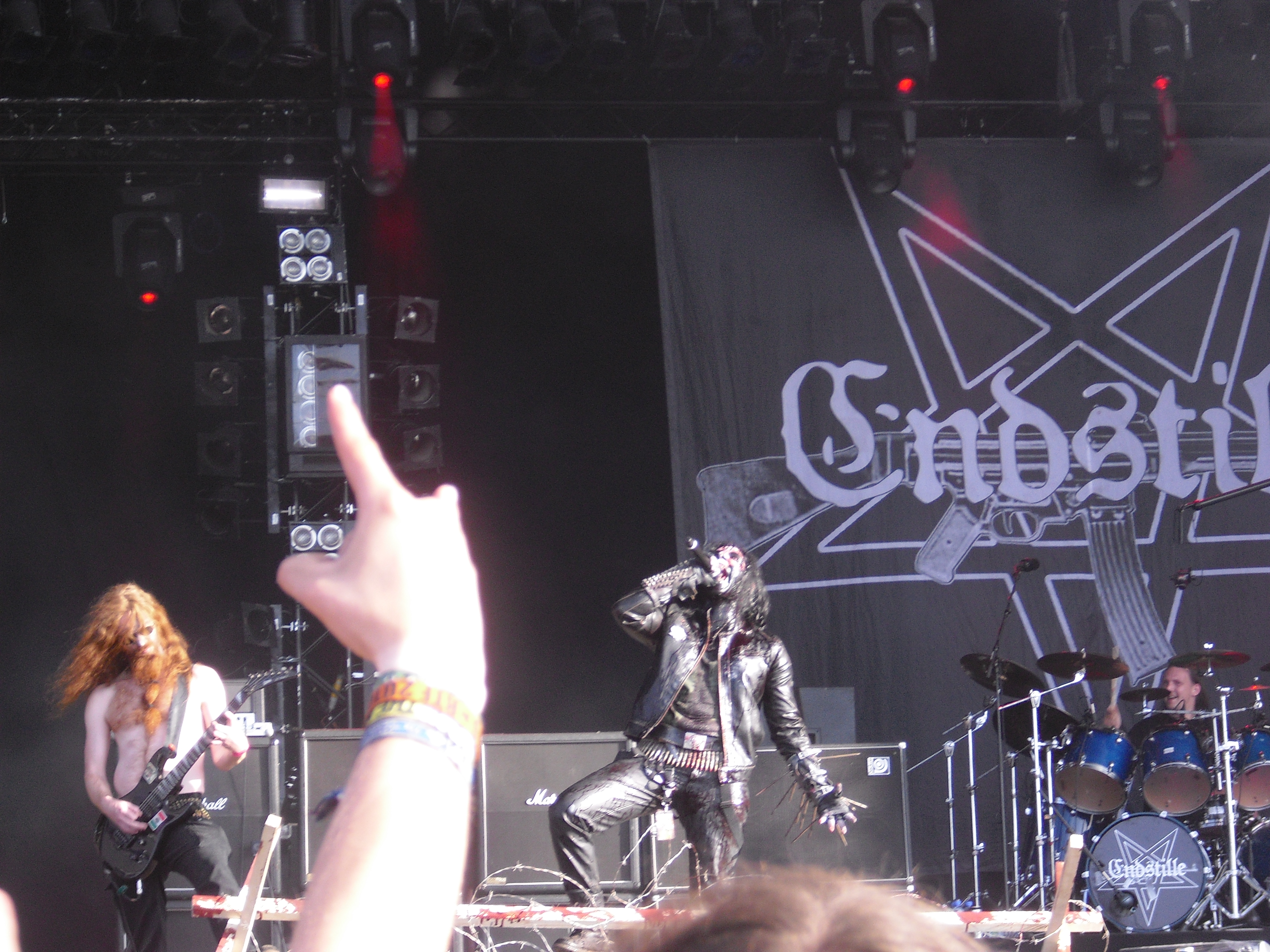
- Endstille performing live at Wacken Open Air in August 2010

Background information
- Origin: Kiel, Germany
- Genre: Black metal
- Years active: 2000–present
- Labels: Regain Records, Season of Mist
- Members: Zingultus; Mayhemic Destructor; L. Wachtfels; Cruor
- Past members: Iblis
- Website: http://www.endstille.com/

Endstille is a black metal band from Germany. It was founded in 2000 by L. Wachtfels (guitar), Mayhemic Destructor (drums), Iblis (vocals) and Cruor (bass) in Kiel. L. Wachtfels and Mayhemic Destructor had previously played in the band Tauthr, while Iblis and Cruor came from the band Octoria. They describe their music as "ugliest aggressive black metal with the fire-speed of an MG42 and the power of heavy ship-artillery". The lyrics refer, to a large extent, to the personal experiences and opinions of the band members. In its self-manifestation, the group refers to well-known German weapons from the time of World War II. This, in addition to the band's lyrics, is sometimes seen an indication of a right-wing extremist affinity within the band. Endstille clearly dissociates itself from such labels, explains to have no sympathies for right-wing ideas and says black metal "is in its principle unpolitical".

In spring 2006, Endstille embarked on a highly successful European tour headlined by Dark Funeral and Naglfar, and supported by Finnish death metal band Amoral.

In 2009, vocalist Zingultus (Nagelfar, Graupel) replaced Iblis.

== Line-up ==
=== Current members ===
- Zingultus: Vocals
- Mayhemic Destructor: drums
- L.Wachtfels: guitars
- Cruor: Bass, backing vocals
- B.Killed: guitars (since 2012)

=== Former members ===
- Iblis: Vocals (2000–2009)

== Discography ==
=== Studio releases ===
- Operation Wintersturm - (Twilight Records, 2002)
- Frühlingserwachen - (Twilight, 2003)
- Dominanz - (Twilight, 2004; reissued by Regain in 2008)
- Navigator - (Twilight, 2005)
- Lauschangriff... - (2006, Split album with Graupel)
- Endstilles Reich - (2007)
- Verführer - (Regain, 2009)
- Infektion 1813 - (Season of Mist, 2011)
- Kapitulation 2013 - (2013)
- DetoNation - (Ván_Records, 2023)

=== Demos ===
- DEMOn - (2001)
