= Eivor =

- Gender: Unisex

Origin
- Origin: Old Norse
- Region of origin: Nordic

Other names
- Cognate: Eyvǫr
- Related names: Eivør, Eyvor, Øivor, Øyvor, Eivör, Eyvör

Eivor, Eivør or Øyvor is a Unisex given name in the Nordic countries. In Sweden, 4,922 people bear the name. The average age is 78.

The name perhaps originated from either the Proto-Norse word auja, which is thought to mean "good luck", or from Old Norse ey- or øy-, meaning "island", and secondly from -varr, meaning "careful", or perhaps from the Proto-Norse word *warjaʀ, meaning "defender". The Old Norse form of the name was Eyvǫr or Øyvǫr.

== Notable people ==
=== Faroese ===
- Eivør Pálsdóttir (born 1983), known professionally as Eivør, Faroese singer-songwriter

=== Norwegians ===
- Øyvor Hansson (1893–1975), Norwegian politician

=== Swedes ===
- Eivor Alm
- Eivor Engelbrektsson (1914–2004), Swedish actress
- Eivor Landström
- Eivor Olson
- Eivor Steen-Olsson

== In popular culture ==
- Eivor Varinsdottir, the protagonist of the 2020 video game Assassin's Creed: Valhalla.
