= Danny Larsen =

Norwegian snowboarder & artist (born 1981)

- Born: 1981; Lommedalen, Norway
- Occupations: Visual artist; Former professional snowboarder
- Website: https://www.dannylarsen.no

Danny Larsen is a visual artist and former professional snowboarder, born in Oslo, 1981.

== Sport ==
He was a sponsored rider for K2 Snowboards before progressing his career as a visual artist.

== Art ==
Inspired by themes including nature and Norwegian folklore, Larsen’s pointillist works have been shown at numerous galleries and institutions, including a solo exhibition at The Kittelsen Museum, Norway, Tidal Art Show, Switzerland, and at RedHouse Gallery, UK.

His professional career as an artist began in 2012 through a collaboration with the store Etnies, showcasing a range of his drawings at their flagship base in Amsterdam. He also created a signature shoe design for the brand - The RVS Danny Larsen.

He has produced illustrations for Norwegian bands including Satyricon, Sibiir and Djevel.

In 2016 Larsen developed a partnership with the three-Michelin-starred restaurant Maaemo, Oslo, producing artwork and illustrations for their publication Maaemo: Mutter Erde.

His work has been included in New Nordic: Cuisine, Aesthetics and Place in 2025 - showing at the National Museum, Norway.

His first solo show in the UK took place in July 2025, at Gallery Eight, Duke Street St James, London.
