= Forndom =

Swedish folk musician

- Born: Ludvig Swärd
- Genres: Nordic folk, Ambient
- Instruments: traditional, Nordic
- Years active: 2012 - present
- Label: Nordvis

Forndom is the stage name of Swedish multi-instrumentalist and Nordic folk musician Ludvig Swärd. He has released four albums: 2024's Moþir, 2020's Faþir, 2016's Dauðra Dura, and 2015's Flykt. The name Forndom is a combination of the Old Norse word fordom, meaning "of old", and the modern Swedish word forn, which means "ancient". Forndom's sound has been compared to that of Wardruna, as well as other bands in the Nordic folk scene.

== History and Music ==
Prior to starting Forndom, Swärd ran an amateur photography blog on the social media platform Tumblr. His first release, Flykt, was made to be an accompaniment to his photos. This first album was recorded entirely using virtual instruments through a DAW. However, Forndom's next release Dauðra Dura was recorded with real instrumentation played by Swärd. These included traditional Norse instruments such as the Tagelharpa, the Näverlur and a Vevlira (or Hurdy-Gurdy).

Dauðra Dura, meaning Doors of Death in Old Norse, was released via the record label Nordvis (also home to progressive black metal band Panopticon) in 2016. Reviewers called it a 'mesmerisingly dark aural adventure', 'a strong addition to the Nordic folk musical landscape' and 'musically compelling'.

Forndom's next album Faþir was released on April 3, 2020, also via the Nordvis label. Early reviewers praised the 'intensity of feeling' and noted the 'deeply sacred dimension' to the music.

Fourth album - Moþir - was released December 6, 2024 via Nordvis.
