= Season of Mist =

Independent record label

- Founded: 1996
- Founder: Michael S. Berberian
- Genre: Heavy metal, extreme metal
- Country of origin: United States, France
- Location: Marseille, France
- Official website: season-of-mist.com

Season of Mist is a French independent record label and record distributor with subsidiaries in France and the United States. The record label was founded in 1996 by Michael S. Berberian in Marseille, France. From the start releasing black metal, pagan metal, and death metal records, the label moved on to releasing albums of avant-garde metal, gothic metal and punk bands as well. The label has two offices, one in Marseille, France and one in Philadelphia, Pennsylvania.

Season of Mist's name originates from The Sandman: Season of Mists, which in turn comes from the opening phrase of John Keats' "To Autumn".

== History ==
Season of Mist was formed in 1996, while founder Michael S. Berberian was completing his studies in economic studies initially, according to Berberian, to avoid the compulsory national military service in France. Since his graduation, the label has become a full-time job for Michael and achieved a steady growth with Season of Mist now employing 20 staff members. In 2002, Season of Mist also started out as a distributor for the French territory, which includes other metal labels like Spinefarm Records or Napalm Records on their roster.

From the beginning, Season of Mist focused on releasing more extreme metal records by stylistically diverse bands like Oxiplegatz, Bethzaida and Kampfar. With the signing of Norwegian legends Mayhem in 1999, the label's profile clearly shifted towards black metal and attracted internationally renowned artists like Carpathian Forest, Rotting Christ, Arcturus, and Solefald, with the latter two representing a marked progressive and avant-garde side to Season of Mist.

While staying close to its black metal roots with the creation of the Season of Mist Underground Activists division in 2007, the label widened its musical range and added to its black, death, doom (Saint Vitus) and thrash metal roster bands playing progressive death metal (Morbid Angel, Cynic, Atheist, Gnostic, Gonin-ish), sludge (Kylesa, Outlaw Order Black Tusk), industrial metal (Genitorturers, The CNK, Punish Yourself), hard rock (Ace Frehley), gothic rock (Christian Death), mathcore (The Dillinger Escape Plan, Psykup), garage rock (1969 Was Fine), groove metal (Dagoba, Eths, Trepalium, Black Comedy) and metalcore (Eyeless, The Arrs).

== Roster ==
- 1349
- ABBATH
- Alkaloid
- Altarage
- Anciients
- Atheist
- Auðn
- Baptism
- Barishi
- Benighted
- Beyond Creation
- Bizarrekult
- Black Tusk
- Black Cobra
- Cannabis Corpse
- Carach Angren
- The Casualties
- Chaostar
- Cloak
- Complete Failure
- Craft
- Crippled Black Phoenix
- Darkspace
- Deathspell Omega
- Defeated Sanity
- Defiled
- Départe
- Der Weg einer Freiheit
- Deströyer 666
- Disperse
- Dodecahedron
- Drudkh
- Earth Electric
- Eihwar
- Eivør
- Emptiness
- Endstille
- Engel
- Enthroned
- Esben and the Witch
- Esoteric
- Eternal Gray
- Eths
- Foscor
- Funeral
- Gaahls Wyrd
- Gaerea
- Garmarna
- George Kollias
- Gonin-ish
- Gorguts
- Grave Desecrator
- The Great Old Ones
- Hark
- Hate Eternal
- Hegemon
- Heilung
- HELGA
- Hell Militia
- Hierophant
- Hooded Menace
- Imperium Dekadenz
- Impure Wilhelmina
- Incantation
- KEN Mode
- Kontinuum
- Leng Tch'e
- The Lion's Daughter
- Mark Deutrom (ex-Melvins)
- Mayhem
- Merrimack
- Misery Index
- Necronomicon
- Necrowretch
- Necrophagia
- Ne Obliviscaris
- Nidingr
- Nightbringer
- Nightmarer
- Nocturnal Graves
- Numenorean
- Obsidian Kingdom
- Replacire
- Revenge
- Ritual Killer
- River Black
- Rotten Sound
- Rotting Christ
- Saint Vitus
- Saor
- Sarah Longfield
- Septicflesh
- Shape of Despair
- Sinistro
- Skuggsjá
- Shining
- Sólstafir
- Sons of Balaur
- Strigoi
- Sylvaine
- This Gift Is A Curse
- Thy Catafalque
- Tsjuder
- Ulsect
- Unverkalt
- Venomous Concept
- Vévaki
- Vipassi
- Virvum
- Voyager
- Vulture Industries
- Weedeater
- Wildlights
- Windswept
- Withered
- Wormed
- Zhrine
- Zuriaake

== North American roster ==
Bands signed on a license deal with Season of Mist for exclusive release in North America.

- Abysmal Dawn – American death metal
- Astarte – Greek black metal
- Beherit – Finnish black metal
- Deathspell Omega – French black metal
- Dying Fetus – American death metal
- Eluveitie – Swiss folk metal
- Enslaved – Norwegian progressive black metal
- Finntroll – Finnish folk black metal
- Forgotten Tomb – Italian black metal
- Legion of the Damned – Dutch thrash metal
- Moonsorrow – Finnish folk black metal
- Reverend Bizarre – Finnish doom metal
- Sadist – Italian technical death metal
- Shape of Despair – Finnish funeral doom metal
- Shining – Swedish black metal
- Sopor Aeternus – German darkwave
- The Gathering – Dutch atmospheric rock
- To Separate the Flesh from the Bones – Finnish grindcore
- Within Temptation – Dutch gothic metal

== Distributed labels ==
Record companies distributed in France by Season of Mist.

- Accession
- Ad Noiseam
- Agonia Records
- Agua Recordings
- Alfa Matrix
- Ant-Zen
- Anticulture
- Ark Records
- Audioglobe
- Aura Mystique
- Avantgarde Music
- Basement Apes Records
- Black Flames
- Black Lotus Records
- Black Mark Production
- Black Rain/Noitekk
- Bones Brigade Records
- Candlelight/PlasticHead
- Cargo Records
- Code 666
- Cold Meat Industry
- Cold Spring
- Cruz del Sur
- Cyclic Law
- Cyclone Empire
- D8k Prod
- Danse Macabre
- Deadrock Industry/Customcore
- Deaf & Dumb Music
- Debemur Morti
- dependent
- Displeased Records
- Divine Comedy
- Drakkar Entertainment
- Dream Catcher
- Favored Nations
- Firebox Records
- GMR Music
- Great Dane Records
- GSR Records
- Hall of Sermon
- I For Us
- I Hate Records
- La Chambre Froide
- Lifeforce Records
- M-Tronic
- Magic Circle Music
- Massacre Records
- Masterpiece Records
- Metal Blade/Silverdust
- Metal Mind Productions
- Metropolis Records
- Morbid Records
- Moribund Records
- Music Avenue
- Napalm Records
- Norma Evangelium Diaboli
- Northern Silence
- Nova Media/Alice In.../Bloodline/Minuswelt/Dancing Ferret/Pandaimonium
- Optical Sound
- Out of Line
- Painkiller Records
- People Like You
- Prikosnovénie
- Prophecy Productions
- Psychonaut Records
- Pulverised Records
- Rage of Achilles
- Repo Records
- Scarlet Records
- Sepulchral Production
- Several Bleeds/Rupture Music
- Shunu Records
- Sound Pollution
- Spinefarm
- Suburban Records
- Supernal Music
- Target Records
- Tatra Productions
- Tesco Organisation
- The End Records
- Trendkill Records
- Twilight Vertrieb
- Underclass
- Virusworx
- Von Jakhelln
