= Daniel Larsson =

Daniel Larsson may refer to:

- Daniel Larsson (ice hockey) (born 1986), Swedish ice hockey goaltender
- Daniel Larsson (footballer) (born 1987), Swedish footballer
- Daniel Larsson (darts player) (born 1981), Swedish darts player
- Dan Larsson (born 1958), Swedish swimmer
- Danne Larsson (born 1948), Swedish singer-songwriter, guitarist and businessman

== See also ==
- Dan Larson (born 1954), baseball pitcher
- Daniel Larsen (disambiguation)
