= Kampfar =

Norwegian black metal band

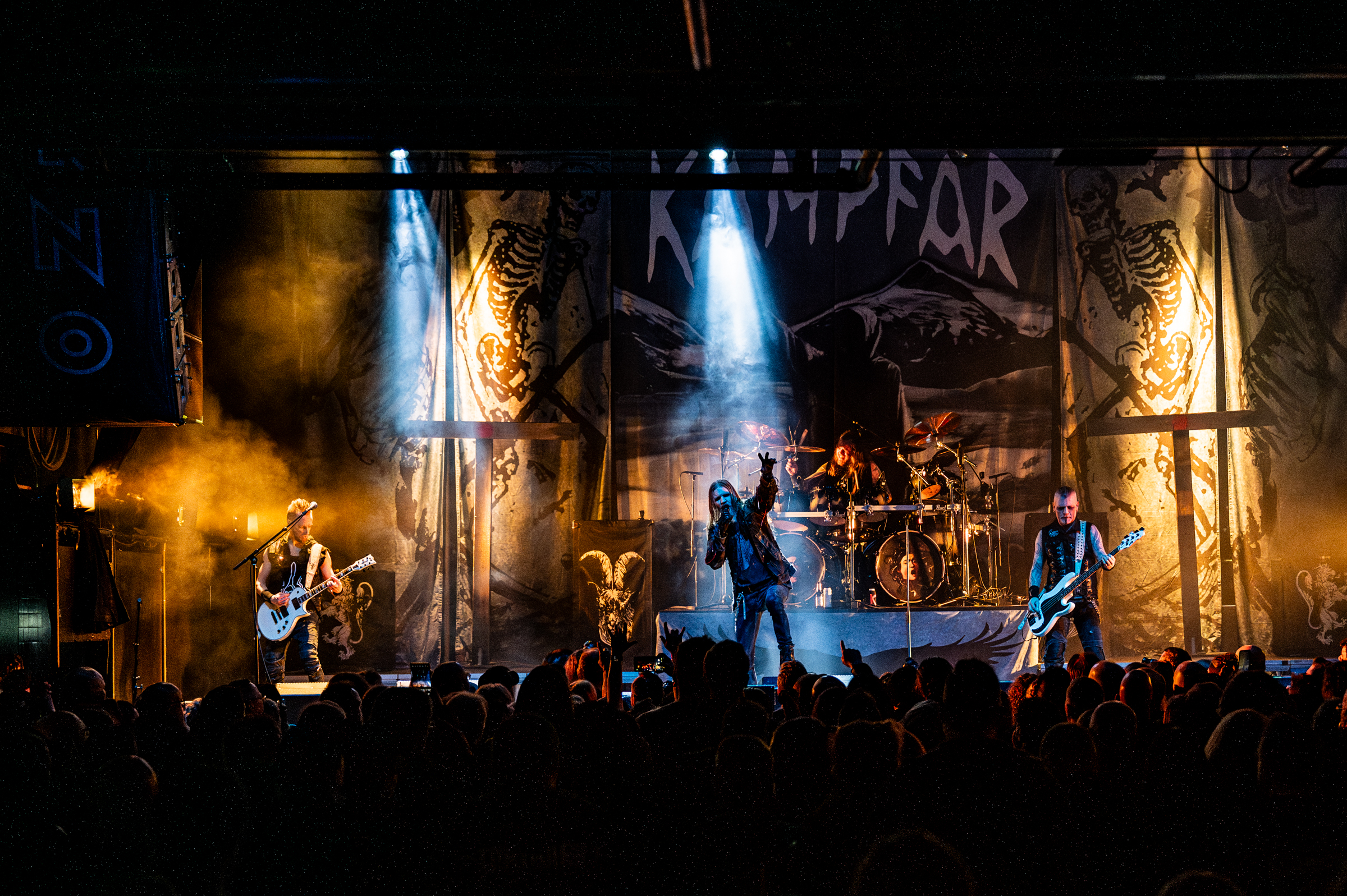
- Kampfar performing live at Inferno Metal festival (Norway) in March 2024

Background information
- Origin: Fredrikstad, Norway
- Genres: Black metal, Viking metal, black 'n' roll
- Years active: 1994–present
- Labels: Indie Recordings, Napalm Records, Hammerheart Records, Malicious Records
- Members: Dolk; Ask; Ole; Ese
- Past members: Jon; Thomas
- Website: www.kampfar.com

Kampfar is a black metal band from Fredrikstad, Norway. According to singer Dolk, their name is an ancient Norse battle cry meaning Odin or Wotan. Kampfar plays black metal inspired by Norwegian folklore and nature. James Christopher Monger of AllMusic said the band has elements of neoclassical music and viking metal. The band is signed to Indie Recordings.

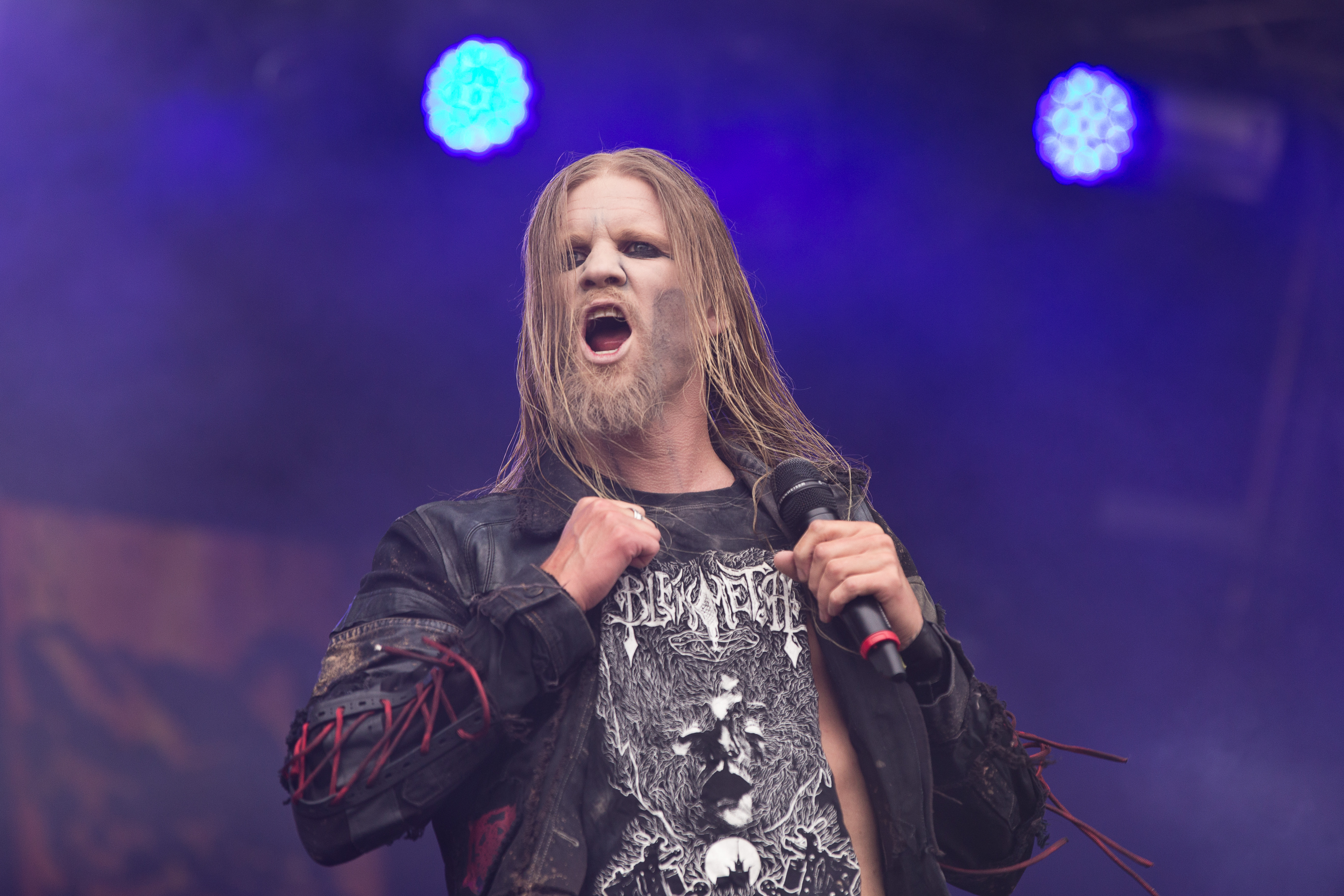
Singer Dolk at Rockharz Open Air 2016

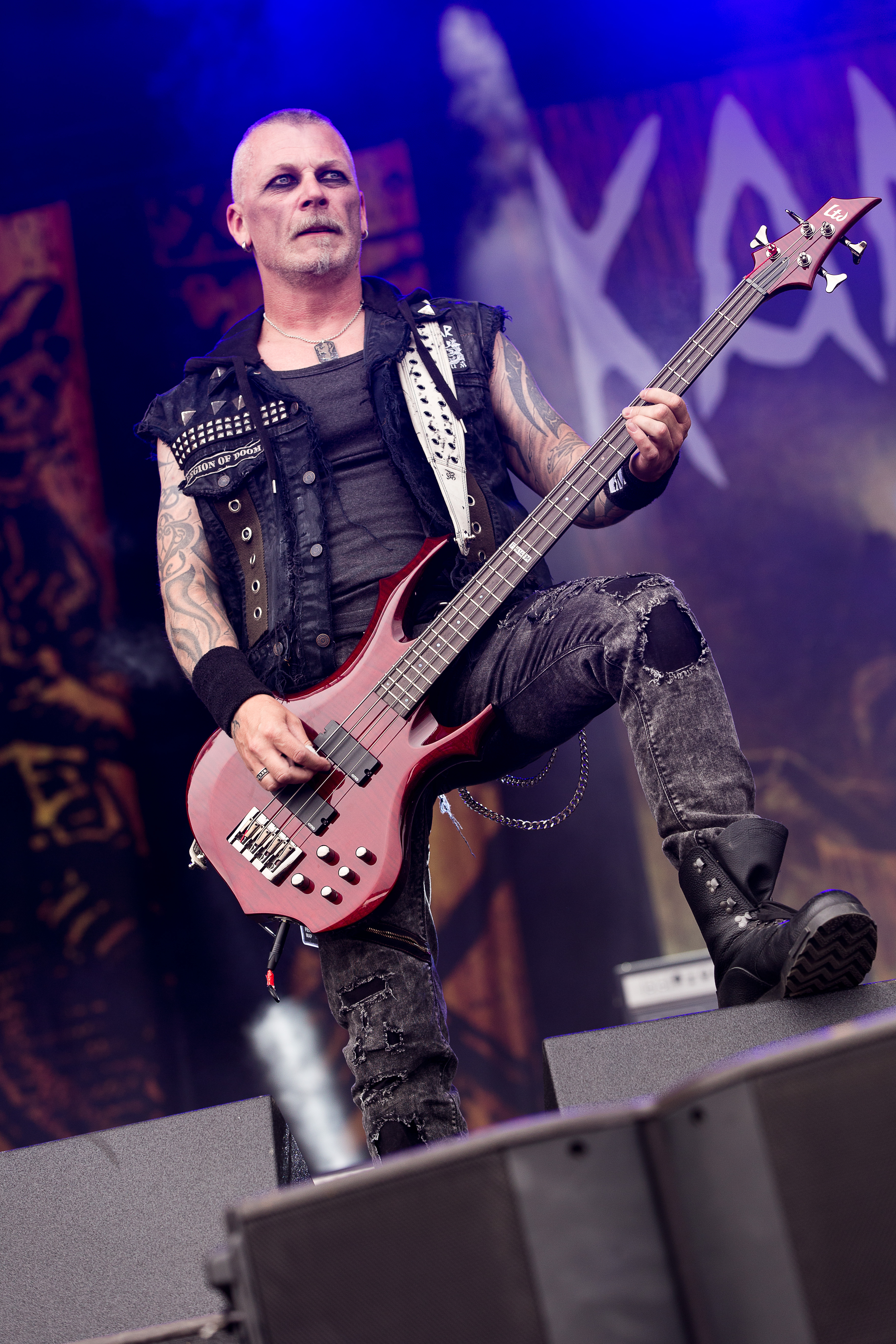
Ex-bassist Jon at Rockharz 2016

== History ==
Dolk formed Kampfar in 1994, when he left former band Mock, and Thomas joined him. Two years later, the duo released a self-titled EP. This was followed by the release of the band's first full-length album, Mellom skogkledde aaser, in 1997. The band released their second album, Fra underverdenen, in 1999. The album features "Norse", the band's first song written in English, as opposed to Norwegian. The song was featured on the band's second EP, Norse, released in 1998. The sound on Fra Underverdenen moved away from the folk of previous releases and toward classical music. Following Fra Underverdenen, Kampfar was put on hold. The band returned in 2003, when bass player Jon Bakker and drummer and vocalist Ask joined them. Despite a new lineup, the band did not perform live until 2004. The band made their first appearance at the Moshfest festival in Halden. Their 2006 album Kvass was recorded between November 2005 and January 2006 with producer Rune Jørgensen in Silvertone Studio in Gamle Fredrikstad. The band used the same studio and producer for Heimgang in 2008.

In 2010 Kampfar entered Abyss Studio in Sweden to record Mare with producer Peter Tägtgren. Thomas quit the band before the album was released and was replaced with Ole (Mistur, Emancer) for upcoming live shows. Ole later joined the band permanently and Kampfar toured Norway, North America and Europe twice to support the album.

In 2013, the band went back to Abyss Studio to record Djevelmakt with Jonas Kjellgren as producer and Peter Tägtgren mixing. Djevelmakt was released worldwide 27 January 2014.

A little over a year later, on 13 November 2015, the band released Profan. The album won Norway's 2015 Spellemann Award for best metal album of the year.

On 3 May 2019, Kampfar released Ofidians Manifest. This album was nominated for the 2019 Spellemann Award in the metal category.

The band played Maryland Deathfest in 2025.

== Discography ==
Studio albums

- Mellom skogkledde aaser (Malicious Records 1997, re-release Napalm Records 2006)
- Fra underverdenen (Hammerheart Records 1999, re-release Napalm Records 2006)
- Kvass (Napalm Records 2006)
- Heimgang (Napalm Records 2008)
- Mare (Napalm Records 2011)
- Djevelmakt (Indie Recordings 2014)
- Profan (Indie Recordings 2015)
- Ofidians Manifest (2019)
- Til klovers takt (2022)

Singles and EPs

- Promo (demo, 1995)
- Kampfar (EP, 1996)
- Norse (EP, 1998)
- Mylder (single, 2013)
- Swarm Norvegicus (single, 2014)
- Icons (single, 2015)
- Tornekratt (single, 2016)
- Ophidian (single, 2019)
- Syndefall (single, 2019)
- Lausdans Under Stjernene (single, 2022)
- Urkraft (single, 2022)

== Members ==
=== Current members ===
- Dolk (Per Joar Spydevold) — vocals (1994–present), drums (1994–2003)
- Ask (Ask Ty Ulvhedin Bergli Arctander) — vocals, drums (2003–present)
- Ole (Ole Hartvigsen) — guitar (2011–present)
- Ese (Stig Ese Eliassen) — bass (2024–)

=== Former members ===
- Jon (Jon Bakker) — bass (2004–2024)
- Thomas (Thomas Andreassen) — guitar (1994–2010), bass (1994–2003)

Timeline

== Equipment ==
- ESP Guitars & Basses
- EMG Pickups
- ENGL Powerball
- Blackstar Unity
- Rotosound strings (Drop D tuning)
- Shure GLX-D Wireless
- Paiste Cymbals
- Richter straps
- Darkglass effects
