= Skáld (band) =

French folk music group

SKÁLD
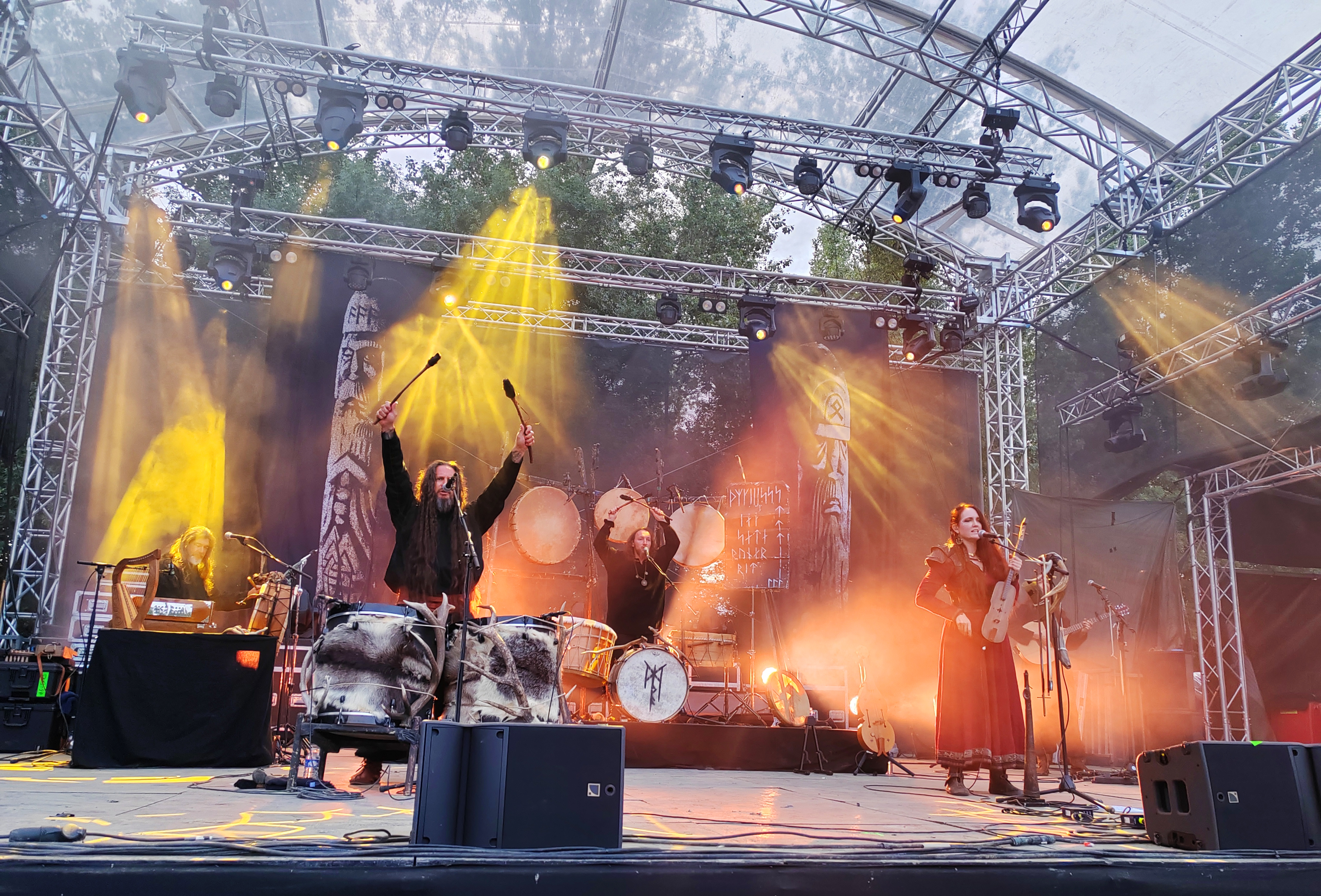
- Skáld in 2026

Background information
- Origin: France
- Genres: Neofolk; Nordic folk; Pagan folk
- Years active: 2018–present
- Label: Napalm
- Members: Christophe Voisin-Boisvinet; Steeve Petit; Marie Potosniak; Marti Ilmar Uibo; Guillaume Levy
- Past members: Ravn; Lily Jung; Julien Loko; Chaos Heidi; Justine Galmiche; Pierrick Valence; Mattjö Haussy; Xavier Bertand
- Website: skaldmusic.com

Skáld (stylised as SKÁLD) is a French Nordic folk group formed in 2018. Their songs bear a heavy Norse influence, making use of traditional instruments and the themes they treat are mostly centred on Scandinavian culture, especially on Norse mythology and they use mostly Nordic languages, particularly Old Norse.

== History ==
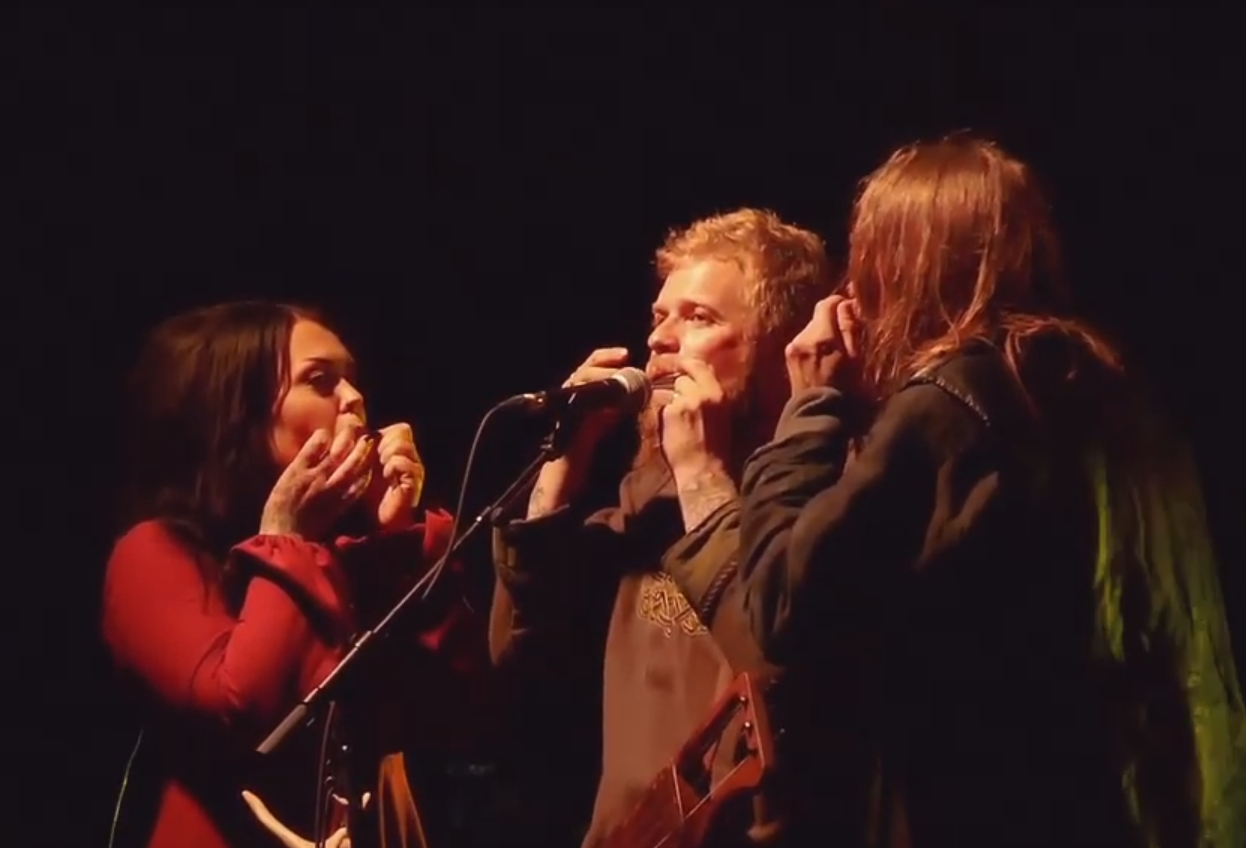
SKÁLD in concert in 2019

=== Origins ===
The band was formed in 2018 by producer Christophe Voisin-Boisvinet, together with singers and musicians Justine Galmiche, Pierrick Valence, and Mattjö Haussy. They aimed to tell Nordic myths and legends singing mainly in Old Norse. The name "Skáld" comes from the Old Norse for "skald": a poet who composed skaldic poetry, usually in the courts during the Viking Age.

In August 2018, their first EP was released, featuring three songs: Gleipnir, Ódinn, and Rún. These three tracks were later included in their first album, released on 25 January 2019 by Decca: Vikings Chant. This album was re-issued with the name Vikings Chant (Alfar Fagrahvél Edition) during the following September with three more covers and two new tracks.

On 29 February 2020, Mattjö Haussy announced his departure from Skáld in favour of the new music project Hrafngrímr. Skáld's second album Vikings Memories was released on 9 October the same year, featuring Justine Galmiche and Pierrick Valence as official members of the group, with the first single Fimbulvetr published in August. Pierrick Valence departed from the group following the release of their second album, and on 21 October 2021, the single Jólanótt was published, preceding the release of their second EP Winter Songs, released on 29 October 2021, featuring Justine Galmiche as the only official member of the band, besides composer Christophe Voisin-Boisvinet.

=== Huldufólk and the new line-up ===
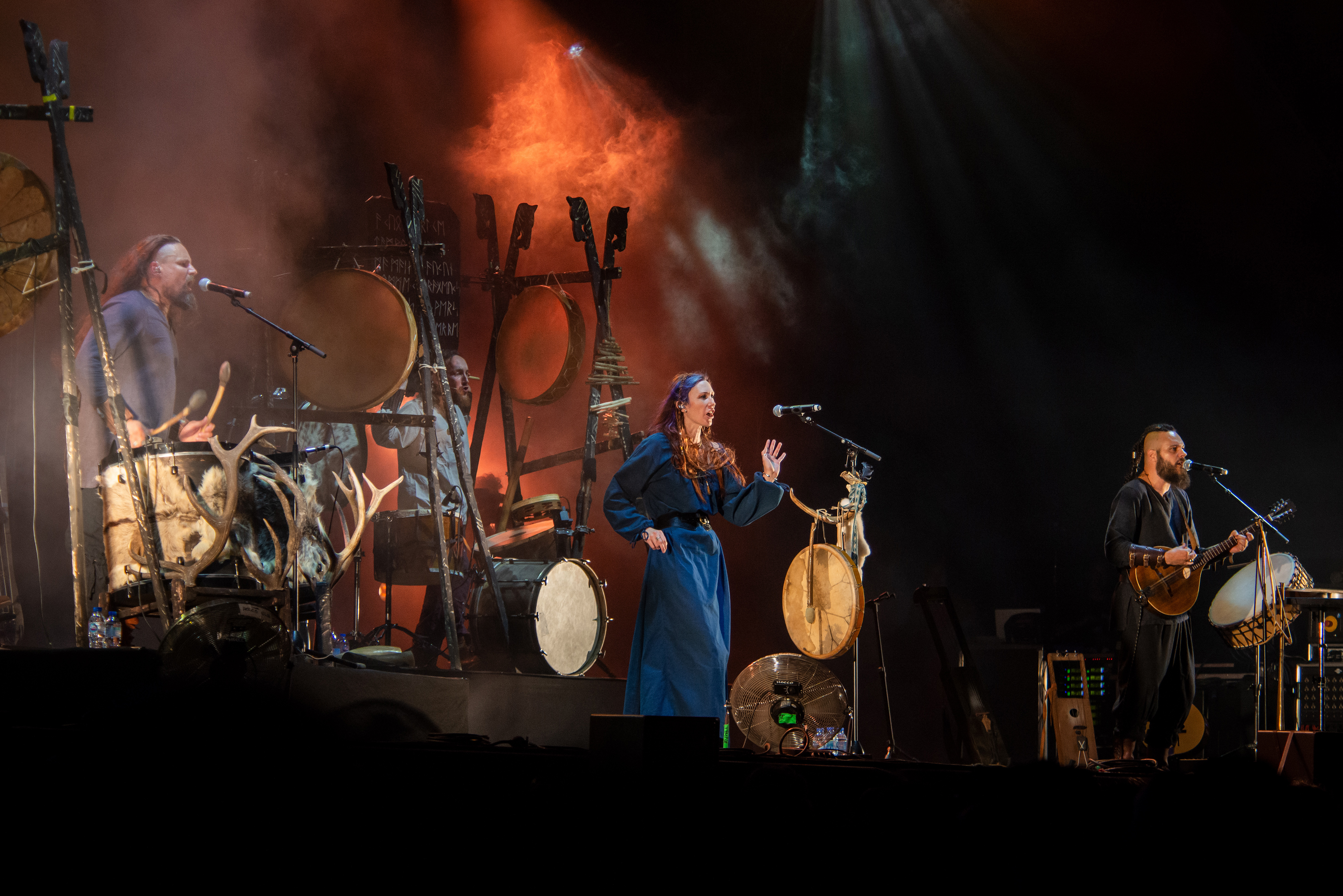
SKÁLD at Hellfest 2022

In June 2022, before the band's summer tour, it was announced that lead singer Justine Galmiche would leave the group due to undisclosed health reasons. She was substituted by singer Chaos Heidi, who toured together with new group members: Steeve Petit, Marti Ilmar Uibo, Ravn, and Julien Loko.

On 20 September 2022, the new album Huldufólk was announced on Skáld's social media pages, and was released on 20 January 2023. The first single Troll Kalla Mik was released on 17 November 2022, featuring the new line-up of the band: Steeve Petit, Marti Ilmar Uibo, Ravn, Julien Loko, Lily Jung, Chaos Heidi, Kohann, Laetitia Marcangeli, and uRYa. However, Chaos Heidi, who had taken part to the summer tour with Skáld, left the band before the release of the new album, and was substituted as a lead singer by Lily Jung during the band's European tour in October 2022.

== Style ==
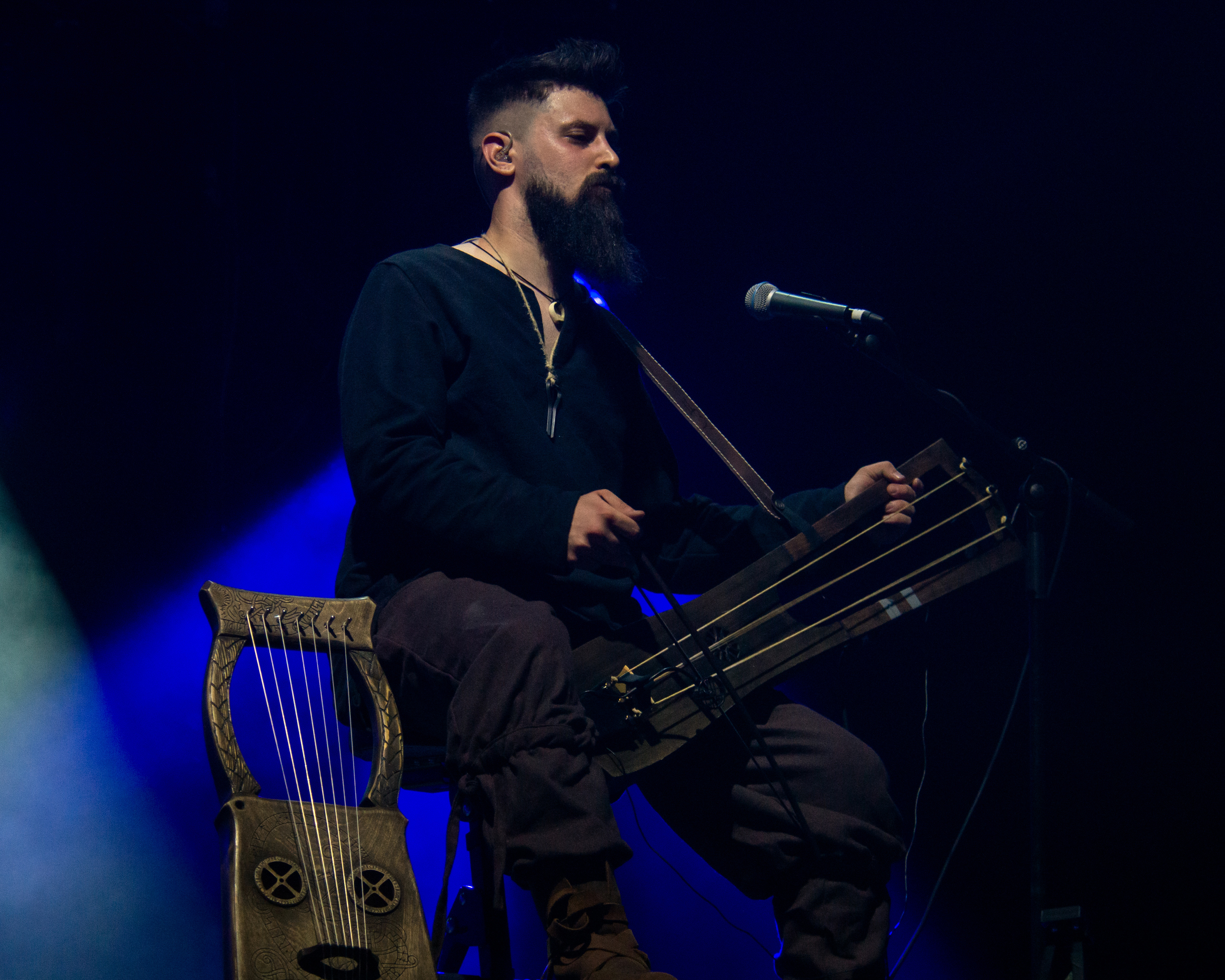
SKÁLD's Ravn playing a talharpa during a concert in 2022

The band's repertoire is derived mostly from Norse texts, which were originally re-adapted by Christophe Voisin-Boisvinet alone, and since 2021, by Voisin and Anna Scussel. The most used language is Old Norse, but other Nordic languages have also been employed, including modern Icelandic, Faroese, Norwegian, and Swedish, as well as a few covers in English and German.

The themes treated by Skáld in their albums are several. Their first album Vikings Chant focused mostly on some of the most famous elements of Norse mythology and religion, like the gods Odin and Freyja, Valhalla, or the ash tree Yggdrasil, with texts taken mainly from the Poetic Edda. The main focus of their second album Vikings Memories is the element of water, collecting songs about mythological sea creatures, sea-kings, and voyagers like Yngvar víðförla. Their third album Huldufólk borrows its title from the hidden people of Icelandic and Faroese folklore, and shifts the focus to the woods instead, revolving around the theme of folkloristic Nordic figures like trolls, elves, skogsrå, and dragons.

The band uses a variety of instruments from the Norse tradition, dating back to the 14th century. Among the instruments the group has employed, their repertoire numbers, among others, shamanic drums, lyre, talharpa, citole, jouhikko, and nyckelharpa.

== Members ==
=== Current members ===
==== Touring members ====
- Christophe Voisin-Boisvinet: composer, drums, fiddles, harp
- Steeve Petit: drums, vocals
- Marie Potosniak: lead vocal, fiddles
- Marti Ilmar Uibo: drums, vocals
- Guillaume Levy: bouzouki

==== Additional members ====
- Ravn: nyckelharpa, lyre, talharpa, moraharpa, gudok, lyra viol, harp, double harp
- Kohann: vocals
- Laetitia Marcangeli: vocals, hurdy-gurdy
- uRYa: vocals, didgeridoo, morin khuur

=== Former members ===
- Lily Jung: lead vocals
- Julien Loko: vocals, Irish bouzouki, talharpa (2022–2023)
- Chaos Heidi: vocals (2022)
- Justine Galmiche: vocals (2018-2022)
- Pierrick Valence: vocals, talharpa, nyckelharpa, citra, jouhikko (2018–2020)
- Mattjö Haussy: vocals (2018–2019)
- Xavier Bertand: vocals (2018–2019)

== Discography ==
=== Albums ===
- Vikings Chant (2019)
- Vikings Chant (Alfar Fagrahvél Edition) (2019)
- Vikings Memories (2020)
- Huldufólk (2023)
- Ørlǫg (2026)

=== EPs ===
- Skáld (2018)
- Winter Songs (2021)

=== Singles ===
- 2018 – Ódinn
- 2018 – Gleipnir
- 2018 – Rún
- 2018 – Ó Valhalla
- 2019 – Seven Nation Army
- 2019 – Flúga
- 2019 – Hross
- 2020 – Fimbulvetr
- 2020 – Grótti
- 2020 – Norðrljós
- 2021 – Jólanótt
- 2022 – Troll Kalla Mik
- 2022 – Då Månen Sken
- 2023 – Du Hast
- 2023 – Elverhøy
- 2026 – Draumakona
- 2026 – Himinbjǫrg
- 2026 – Dǫkksalir
