= Heilung =

European medieval folk group

- Heilung performing at Midgardsblot, 2022; Maria Franz centre, Kai Uwe Faust with horns to the left

Background information
- Origin: Copenhagen, Denmark
- Genres: Folk; neofolk; ethnic music; ambient; industrial
- Years active: 2014–Present
- Label: Season of Mist
- Members: Kai Uwe Faust; Christopher Juul; Maria Franz

Heilung is a European experimental folk music band. Formed in 2014 in Copenhagen, Denmark, the group is made up of members from Denmark, Norway, and Germany. Their music is based on texts and runic inscriptions from Germanic peoples of the Iron Age and Viking Age. Heilung describe their music as "amplified history from early medieval northern Europe". Their music is usually about Germanic deities, the Jǫtnar, and valkyries. "Heilung" is a German noun meaning "healing".

== History ==
Heilung was founded in 2014 in Copenhagen, Denmark by vocalist Kai Uwe Faust (a German tattoo artist who specializes in Old Norse tattoos) and Danish producer Christopher Juul. Juul, who had operated his own recording studio, Lava, in Copenhagen since 2003, admired Faust's visual work as a tattoo artist, so they struck a bargain: Faust offered Juul some free tattoos in exchange for help recording some poems. After this, Heilung was started.

Later in 2015, Maria Franz (Juul's longtime girlfriend and a singer in progressive rock/pop-rock band Euzen in which Juul also played piano and electronics) started to work with Heilung – originally as a session vocalist. In 2015, the band self-released their debut album, Ofnir, and soon after that Franz became the band's third official member.

The band's first performances in 2017 were at Castlefest and at the Midgardsblot Metalfestival. The Castlefest performance was recorded and released with the title Lifa on YouTube and as a live album. Their 2017 performance at Midgardsblot was listed by Metal Hammer as one of the ten best performances of 2017. Later that year, the band signed a contract with the label Season of Mist.

On 20 April 2018, the two previously self-released albums Ofnir and Lifa were reissued on vinyl and CD.

The band composed the soundtrack for Senua's Saga: Hellblade II. Fragments of Heilung's music were used during season six of the popular television series Vikings.

Heilung released their third studio album, Drif, on 19 August 2022 through Season of Mist. The album peaked at No. 9 and No. 25 in the German and Austrian album charts respectively.

Heilung performed at Glastonbury Festival 2024. They contribued as guest musicians on Kati Rán's SÁLA album. In November 2024, Heilung announced a European tour for 2025, with a final show on 17 August after which they planned to go on a hiatus. They announced the end of their hiatus in September 2026.

== Style ==
According to Faust, the name of the band, "Heilung", which means "healing" in German, says something about the style of the band: "The listener is supposed to be left at ease and in a relaxed state after a magical musical journey that is at times turbulent". The recordings of the band are not limited to music, but also contain poems and the spoken word. The music has a kind of timeless quality, offering a version of shamanic music intended not simply for esthetic appreciation but immersive, visceral connection.

The references to the early ages of European cultures are also made by using texts from historical artefacts or historical poems. The languages used are varied, with German, English, Gothic, Old High German, Icelandic, Latin, Old English, Proto-Norse, Proto-Germanic, and Viking age Old Norse being used.

As instruments, items are used that may have been already available to humans in the Iron Age, such as drums, bones or spears. According to an August 2018 interview, the instruments they use consist of:

- drums, including one with horse skin painted with human blood, two drums with deerskin and a drum with goatskin
- bones, including a human forearm bone and deer bones
- a buffalo horn rattle
- a clay rattle with human ashes
- a Hindu ritual bell
- antiques from temples
- a reconstructed silver cup from the Viking age
- a ravanahatha (an ancient instrument used in India, Sri Lanka and surrounding areas, originating from Hela People, then brought to North India by Hanuman, then to India)
- other rattles, whistles, and percussive instruments

Faust's throat singing recalls the Mongolian style. Juul uses a chirping whisper as vocals.

Elaborately designed costumes are worn by the band members on stage. These are partly based on the "spiritual traditions of the Eurasian circumpolar peoples", or are historically correct reproductions of Nordic Bronze Age clothing.

== Members ==
Current members

- Kai Uwe Faust – vocals (2014–present)
- Christopher Juul – music, production (2014–present)
- Maria Franz – vocals (2015–present)

Session/touring musicians

- Jacob Lund (2017–present)
- Nicolas Schipper Pérez (2018–present)
- Annicke Shireen (2018–present)
- Mira Ceti (2021–present)
- Emilie Lorentzen (2018–2022)
- Juan Pino (2017–2018)
- Alex Opazo (2017–2022)
- Jonas Lorentzen (2017–2018)

Show group ("Heilung warriors Europe")

- Espen Winther (2017–2018)
- Pan Bartkowiak (2017–2024)
- Faber Horbach (2017–2022)
- Leon Remie (2017)
- Marijn Sies (2017–2024)
- Ruben Terlouw (2017–present)
- Jens de Vries (2017–2022)
- Gwydion Zomer (2017–present)
- Martin Skou (2018–present)
- Martin Kufahl (2018–present)
- Emilie Lorentzen (2018)
- Mira Ceti (2019)
- Jarasol (2019–present)
- Obban (2019–present)
- Sami (2019–present)
- Edward Boyter (2019–present)
- Nadja Kalameiets (2019–present)
- Janne van Ooij (2019–present)
- Adélie (2022–present)
- Chloe Bakker (2022–present)
- Mitchell Bosch (2022–present)
- Luca Borsoti (2022–present)
- Jeff Coyard (2022–present)
- Kristian (2022–present)
- Katalin Papp (2022–present)
- Steven Pilon (2022–present)
- Annet Postma (2022–present)
- Nina Schilp (2022–present)
- Rowan Schuddeboom (2022–present)

Show group ("Heilung warriors USA")

- Alex Chabot (2020–present)
- Danny Davies (2020)
- William Johnson (2020)

== Discography ==
Studio albums

- Ofnir (2015, self-released; reissued in 2018 on Season of Mist)
- Futha (2019, Season of Mist)
- Drif (2022, Season of Mist)
- Sagas (2027, Season of Mist)

Live albums

- Lifa (2017, Season of Mist)
- Lifa Iotungard (2024, Season of Mist)

== Accolades ==
Heilung was nominated in the Best Underground Band category for a Metal Hammer Golden Gods Award in 2018.

Heilung tied for the World Traditional Award in the 18th Independent Music Awards with the song Norupo.

== See also ==
- Merseburg charms
- Old English rune poem
- Kragehul I
- Eggja stone
- Ear (rune)
- Wardruna
