= Amen discography =

Discography of Amen (American band)

- Studio albums: 4
- Live albums: 2
- Compilation albums: 2
- Singles: 4
- Video albums: 1
- Music videos: 2

The discography of the American punk/metal band Amen consists of four studio albums, two compilation albums, two live albums, two music videos, four singles and one video album.

== Albums ==
=== Studio albums ===
List of studio albums, with selected chart positions
Title	Album details	Peak chart positions		Sales
Title	Album details	SCO	UK	Sales
Slave	Released: 1994; Label: Drag-U-La; Format: CD	—	—	
Amen	Released: September 21, 1999; Label: I Am/Roadrunner Records; Format: CD, CS, LP	—	161	US: 15,000+
We Have Come for Your Parents	Released: October 31, 2000; Label: I Am/Virgin Records; Format: CD, CS	68	77	US: 15,789
Death Before Musick	Released: April 13, 2004; Label: EatUrMusic/Columbia; Format: CD	95	105	
"—" denotes a recording that did not chart or was not released in that territory.

=== Compilations ===
List of studio albums, with selected chart positions
Title	Album details
Join, or Die	Released: 2003; Label: Refuse Music; Format: CD
Pisstory: A Catalogue of Accidents/A Lifetime of Mistakes	Released: 2005; Label: Refuse Music; Format: 4 x CD

=== Live albums ===
Title	Album details
Gun of a Preacher Man	Released: August 2, 2005; Label: Secret Records; Format: CD
Here's The Poison	Released: November 4, 2016; Label: Secret Records; Format: CD, DVD

== Singles ==
Title	Year	Peak chart positions			Album
Title	Year	SCO	UK	UK Rock	Album
"Coma America"	1999	—	—	—	Amen
"The Price of Reality"	2000	—	166	8	We Have Come for Your Parents
"Too Hard to Be Free"	2001	72	72	4	We Have Come for Your Parents
"The Waiting 18"	2001	58	61	3	We Have Come for Your Parents
"California's Bleeding"	2004	59	52	2	Death Before Musick
"—" denotes a recording that did not chart or was not released in that territory.

== Video albums ==
Title	Album details
Caught in the Act	Released: 2004; Label: Secret Records; Format: DVD

== Music videos ==
Song	Year	Album
"The Price of Reality"	2000	We Have Come for Your Parents
"California's Bleeding"	2004	Death Before Musick
