= Duke Decter =

American musician (born 1970)

- Decter in 2009

Background information
- Born: March 9, 1970 (age 56)
- Origin: Queens, New York, U.S.
- Genres: Punk rock; hardcore punk; punk blues; alternative rock
- Occupations: Creative producer; musician; singer; songwriter; entertainer
- Instruments: Vocals; guitar
- Years active: 1982–present
- Labels: Flipside; Sony; Geffen; RCA; Virgin; Burger

Duke Decter is an American entertainment producer, former 1980s American hardcore punk guitarist and current producer of the No Uncertain Terms podcast for the non-profit organization U.S. Term Limits.

== Early career ==
Decter started his career at 15 years of age in the South Florida hardcore punk band F. The band was most notable for a six-song EP entitled You Are An E.P. in 1983 (see discography). In 1984, Decter wrote and submitted a song titled "Roddy Pipers Rowdy Hearts Club Band" for The Wrestling Album. The song was to be the feature song for then WWF wrestler Roddy Piper. Although the song did not make the record, it was later included on the Four Bands That Could Change The World compilation album released in 1985 on Gasatanka Records. F did several small east coast tours during the 1980s, touring with the Ramones, White_Flag, and Flag of Democracy. F received radio airplay on Miami's WLRN-FM and record reviews in punk fanzines Flipside and Maximumrocknroll. As a result, F was included on compilation albums by both fanzines, most notably Flipside's Vinyl Fanzine #1 alongside notable punk acts as the Misfits, the Germs, Agent Orange, GBH, and the Dickies; and Maximum Rock N Roll's dedication to Tim Yohannan (see discography). In 1988, F had a 7-inch vinyl record released on Mystic Records, titled Mess You Up, which included a credited guest appearance by famed eccentric ukulele player Tiny Tim.

Previously in 1985, Decter had also joined Disorderly Conduct, a metal-edged punk band also from South Florida featuring a 17 year old Casey Chaos. In 1986, Disorderly Conduct released a full-length album entitled Amen and was featured on the Flipside compilation album Flipside's Vinyl Fanzine 2. That same year, Decter was voted "best new hardcore guitarist" in the fanzine Famous Hardcore of Punkland.

== The Ex-Idols ==
After Disorderly Conduct broke up, Decter and Chaos moved to Los Angeles Chaos started playing with Christian Death; Decter was invited to join the Ex-Idols where he began co-writing with singer/songwriter Gary Finneran aka Gary X. The Ex-Idols released their debut album Social Kill in 1994 on Sony Music sub-label Relativity Records, and toured with English punk band the U.K. Subs. All songs on the record were written by Gary Finneran, with the exception of "Go Away", which was written by Decter. Decter's composition "Go Away" was promoted as the band's second single following their promotional Pill Popper EP. During the Social Kill tour, Decter was interviewed by MeanStreet magazine and had this to say:

Being signed to a major label can sometimes be as much of a problem as it is a benefit. Sure, you get more money to use when you've got a big company behind you, but that does not necessarily mean that the bastards know what to do with the money. As in our case. Sony has a lot of money, but Relativity doesn't know what to do with it. Eventually we had a great album which no one knew existed. We had incredible radio airplay with the single "Go Away" but the CD was placed in all the wrong stores, and (they) wouldn't give us any to sell on tour since it interfered with their sales. This meant we had to take matters into our own hands. And we did when we broke into Relativity's stock warehouse and stole a van full of our own CDs to sell across the country.

In 1996 the Ex-Idols were released from Sony Music before recording their second full-length album independently entitled WhoWeAre. Unable to secure a new record contract and with Gary X's health declining, the band fell apart as bassist Sean DeMott and drummer Lance Porter joined former the Go-Go's Jane Wiedlin in her solo project Frosted. Former Shotgun Messiah and KMFDM musician Tim Skold, who shared the same management company as Decter, brought Decter into his solo project SKOLD, which had secured a recording contract with RCA Records. Decter and Skold toured the US in support of the album and were featured in the movie In God's Hands, a fictional surf drama by Zalman King.

== Huntington Street Television ==
In 1999, Decter began producing a local access television show for Time Warner Cable entitled Huntington Street Television. The comedy/variety show was based out of Huntington Beach, California, featured a masked Mexican wrestler as the host and consisted of original sketch-comedy segments, Orange County music, and underground backyard wrestling. The show ran bi-weekly for two years, with segments and acting contributed by co-writers/actors Greg Mollin, Matt Dickey, Chris Johnson, and Donny Smith. The show also featured interviews with local Mixed martial arts trainers and fighters working for a fast-growing fight promotion called the Ultimate Fighting Championship, now the UFC, where Decter would meet and interview David Tank Abbott, with whom he would later start a popular podcast (see below).

== Amen ==
In 2000, Decter toured and played in various bands including Drown, Diatribe, and ex-bandmate and Finneran's post-Ex-Idols group Tuscaurora and, in 2004, rejoined Casey Chaos in Amen. During Decter's absence from Amen, Chaos had secured three separate major recording contracts with three separate Amen records, Amen (Roadrunner Records, We Have Come for Your Parents (Virgin Records, and Death Before Musick (EatURMusic/Columbia Records).

In 2006 the band was asked to perform on The Henry Rollins Show. It became the first performance on The Henry Rollins Show to have material edited out by IFC itself, against the request of host Henry Rollins. This decision was made due to political death threats made by Casey Chaos between the two songs performed. The performance aired internationally on July 13, 2007, on the 14th episode of Season 2, with the band performing their songs "Coma America" and "Liberation". A third song, "Another Planet", was also taped and made available for public viewing on IFC's website.

As a result of their appearance on The Henry Rollins Show, Amen was asked to co-headline the Damnation Festival with Kreator at Leeds in London, UK, in October 2007 - the festival began their European tour. During the tour, Decter was interviewed by BBC correspondent Laura Snow, and had this to say about longtime friend and bandmate Casey Chaos:

I was done with music ten years ago but had to come back because he (Casey) is so much the real deal. I am sacrificing my personal life to do this. But I know he's real because I've worked with those who aren't. It's shocking to me that my friend has become this crazy artist. More than anyone I know. His life has unfolded in such a way it is proof to me that he is destined. Could be good, could be bad. The only way I can describe him to people is that his life is so unbelievable, it's just not believable. But I've watched it happen since we were little kids. And I'm telling you, he lives in another reality. On another planet. That's why we played that song on The Henry Rollins Show. He is forced to do what he does. It is his unfortunate destiny. Mine too, it seems.

Decter was also interviewed by The Sycophant Magazine regarding his tenure as Tim Skold's guitarist.

After the tour, Amen went into the studio with producer Ross Robinson again to record a fourth album, with Slayer's Dave Lombardo playing drums for the recording sessions. Although entire album's worth of material was recorded, the band was unable to secure a record deal and the album remains unreleased.

== Later career ==
On May 10, 2009, Decter's close friend and Ex-Idols singer/songwriter Gary X Finneran died of suicide. The existing members of the Ex-Idols re-united to perform a set of their material at Finneran's post-funeral reception at the Three of Clubs in Hollywood, California. with Decter taking over on vocals. Decter, in conjunction with Anne Kadrovich and Nick Lane of Tuscaurora, also compiled a CD of Finneran's death-themed songs entitled Goodbye which was given to all in attendance. On July 15, 2009, a track from the second Ex-Idols album WhoWeAre was featured in Season 5 Episode 15 of the television series Rescue Me on FX, starring Denis Leary. In an interview with Celebrity Access, Decter said the following of his departed best friend Gary Finneran:

I have been fortunate to have worked with some great talented people in music. None quite as talented as Gary Finneran, though. I always figured he would be the best songwriter any of us had ever known. I know he would love for everyone to listen to his music from time to time; Ex-Idols, Tuscaurora, etc, and remember him for what he was-- one of the best punk-influenced songwriters in American rock & roll. And that is exactly what we all will do. I look forward to the day we organize to listen, laugh, and talk about the great moments and music which made my awesome, good-hearted friend who was Gary 'X' Finneran so legendary. We will all miss him, and we will all remember him.

In 2012, Decter was recognized as a Master Mason by the Orange Grove Masonic Lodge #293 and Burger Records included F on their compilation album What Have We Wrought? A Mike Atta Benefit Compilation featuring notable punk groups the Circle Jerks, NOFX, the Germs, the Adolescents, the Meatmen, 7 Seconds. In 2014, Amen re-united to perform at the Slipknot Knotfest festival in California with Stone Sour's Roy Mayorga on drums.

Thirty years after the debut of Decter's south Florida band F, a 2014 edition of the Miami New Times voted F one of Miami's Best Hardcore Bands of All Time. Urged by punk luminary Bill Bartell, the band re-united to record two new songs, later released as a four-song 7-inch vinyl EP entitled None Dare Call It Treason which consisted of F covering the Germs "Land of Treason" and the Seeds "Gypsy Play His Drums", plus two songs by Decter's newly created solo project the Duke Decter Army. Also in 2013, the band's original 1983 release "You Are An EP" regained popularity with several vinyl and CD re-releases of the record including a double CD discography titled Burn The World into Ashes And Sweep It Under The Kitchen Rug (see discography).

Following a permanent hearing loss incident, Decter put down his guitar and began a podcast titled The Proving Ground with UFC fight legend David Tank Abbott, whom he had previously met and interviewed while producing Huntington Street Television in the late 1990s in Huntington Beach, California. The podcast quickly garnered media coverage in Rolling Stone, Esquire, and Time after Tank suggested putting up $500,000 of his own money to fight Ronda Rousey, a woman, with the rules being that "when I beat her she has to make me a sandwich." Decter recorded a song with Abbott during this period which was included in the third episode of the podcast, "Put Your Hand in the Hand", with Decter playing guitar and Abbott attempting lead vocals.

== Discography ==
=== Albums and EPs ===
- 1985: F You Are An E.P. (Intendo Distorto)
- 1986: Disorderly Conduct Amen (Dirge Records)
- 1986: F Peace (Starving Missile) Split album w/ White Flag
- 1994: The Ex-Idols Social Kill Relativity Records Sony Music Entertainment
- 1996: Duke Decter & Gary Finneran Send In The Clowns (Remixes) Self released
- 2000: The Ex-Idols WhoWeAre on Relativity Records Sony Music Entertainment
- 2008: F You Are An EP/Mess You Up 20th anniversary edition vinyl re-release (PNV Records)
- 2010: F The Complete Discography 2 disc CD (Punk Records Int'l)
- 2013: F Burn The World into Ashes And Sweep It Under The Kitchen Rug (Punk Records Int'l)

=== Singles and EPs ===
- 1988: F "Mess You Up" E.P. Mystic Records
- 1994: The Ex-Idols "Pill Popper" Relativity Records Sony Music Entertainment
- 2014: F / Duke Decter Army "None Dare Call It Treason" (Jailhouse Records)

=== Compilation album appearances ===
- 1985: (F) Flipside Vinyl Fanzine 1 (Gasatanka Records)
- 1986: (Disorderly Conduct) Flipside Vinyl Fanzine 2 (Gasatanka Records)
- 1987: (F) Four Bands That Could Change The World (Gasatanka Records)
- 1988: (F) Five Bands That Have Changed The World (Funhouse Records)
- 1998: (F) Killed By Florida (La Republica)
- 1999: (F) Maximum Rock N Roll's Tim Yohannan Dedication
- 2012: (F) What Have We Wrought? A Mike Atta Benefit Compilation Burger Records

=== Guest appearances ===
- 1986: White Flag Feeding Frenzy (Bootleg Records)
- 1998: In God's Hands
- 2010: Goodbye - A Memorial to Gary Louis Finneran"

== Appearances in books ==
- 2001: American Hardcore: A Tribal History (Steven Blush, Feral House) p. 312
- 2001: Amped: Notes From A Go-Nowhere Punk Band (John Resh, Viper Press) p. 56
- 2011: Live... Suburbia (Max Morton, Powerhouse Books) - various photos and mentions throughout
