= Casey Chaos =

American singer (1965–2024)

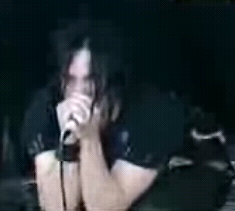
- Chaos performing in 2002

Background information
- Born: Karim George Chmielinski; October 9, 1965; Trenton, New York, U.S.
- Died: December 20, 2024 (aged 59) Laurel Canyon, California, U.S.
- Genres: Alternative metal; hardcore punk; punk rock; nu metal
- Occupations: Singer; songwriter
- Years active: 1982–2024
- Formerly of: Amen; Scum; Disorderly Conduct; Scars on Broadway

Karim George Chmielinski (October 9, 1965 — December 20, 2024), known professionally as Casey Chaos, was an American musician, best known as the lead singer of Amen. His music encompassed a number of styles in the punk and metal genres.

== Early life ==
Karim Chmielinski was born in Trenton, New York, on October 9, 1965. When he was seven, his parents separated and Casey moved with his mother to Melbourne, Florida. By age ten, Casey was touring professionally as a skater.

== Career ==
=== 1982–1990: Disorderly Conduct ===
In 1982, fellow skateboarder Duane Peters played Casey a tape by the band Black Flag. Casey became enough of a fan that he started corresponding with Henry Rollins and his friend Ian MacKaye. After seeing Black Flag for the first time live, Casey's life was forever changed, and he decided to start his own band.

He created Casey and the Skate Punx, and recruited bassist Scot Lade, drummer Bill Erwin, and his childhood friend from New York, guitarist Ken Decter (aka Duke Decter). They later changed the band name to Disorderly Conduct. They began writing songs and playing the Florida punk scene. Between his powerful voice and the band's high-energy presence, they became well-known and popular, with people traveling from as far as Atlanta to catch their shows. Between 1984 and 1986, their songs were included in three punk compilation albums. In 1986, they independently released the album Amen. That was followed a year later by the six-track EP Atrocity.

=== 1990–2024: Amen ===
In 1990, Chaos and Decter moved to Los Angeles, changed their band name to Amen. Chaos met Rikk Agnew, who invited him to sit in as bassist on a concert by his band Christian Death. He then asked Chaos to sing on his new solo album, and play bass on Christian Death's new album, Iconologia, for which Chaos also wrote or co-wrote three songs.

Chaos then wrote and recorded the album Slave, for which he played all of the instruments. He released it under the Amen name in 1994 and began to put together a new lineup: Paul Fig and Sonny Mayo on guitar, John Fahnestock (aka John Tumor) on bass, and Shannon Larkin on drums.

The band was eventually signed to Roadrunner Records, who in 1999 released a split EP with Misfits, the five-track EP Coma America, and the band's debut album, Amen. To support the album, Amen went on a tour of North America with Slipknot, Machine Head, and Coal Chamber, among others. Amen parted ways with Roadrunner and they were quickly picked up by This Is An I Am Recording!, the Virgin Records sub-label of producer Ross Robinson, and went into the studio to record the album We Have Come for Your Parents. In 2001, this album was released and received positive reviews. After the release of We Have Come for Your Parents, Roadrunner re-released Amen due to the popularity of the band and press that they were getting.

In March 2002, Chaos announced that Amen had been dropped from Virgin after internal restructuring of their recording division. Amen had just recorded 20+ tracks for their new album and Virgin refused to release them. Amen went onto tour whilst they searched for a label to release new material under.

In 2004, Daron Malakian of System of a Down had founded his own label through Columbia Records called EatUrMusic Records. Malakian and Chaos had met at the 2002 Big Day Out festival in Australia and had become friends. Chaos put together a new lineup, recruiting bassist Scott Sorry, drummer Luke Johnson, and guitarists Matt Montgomery (aka Piggy D.) and Rich Jones. Amen was the first band Malakian signed and the label released Amen's Death Before Musick in 2004, along with a video for the single "California's Bleeding". The band then embarked on a world tour in promotion of this release.

In 2005, Chaos released a compilation box set that included previously unreleased Amen and Disorderly Conduct track in addition to remixes of previously released songs. The four-CD boxed set was a limited edition release of 2,000 copies Pisstory: A Catalogue of Accidents, a Lifetime of Mistakes.

In 2007, Amen were invited to perform on The Henry Rollins Show, a weekly talk show hosted by musician Henry Rollins on IFC. Amen performed three songs, two of which aired live: "Coma America" and "Liberation", with the third "Another Planet" release in IFC.com. The performance aired internationally on July 13, 2007, on the 14th episode of season 2. Between the two songs, Chaos made political death threats and it became the first of the show's episodes to have material cut by IFC, although it ran the full performance on its website. Amen then went on a full tour of Europe including a co-headline slot with Kreator at the Damnation Festival hosted at the University of Leeds. Amen booked a full European tour.

In 2014, Chaos went back into the studio with Amen to begin recording a new album with Ross Robinson with Dave Lombardo on drums. Due to former commitments, the album recording was not completed with Robinson and Amen went on to perform at Knotfest in support of Slipknot. In late 2019, Chaos went back into the studio to continue work on the latest Amen album in the UK before COVID-19 put a hold on the recording. The album was later reported as finished by the time Chaos’ death occurred in December 2024, and will be released posthumously in the future.

=== Other projects ===
Chaos collaborated with Twiggy Ramirez and members of Queens of the Stone Age on a project called Headband, who recorded music but never released it.

Chaos produced an EP for The Kinison, working with the band off the back of a demo they passed Chaos when he was touring with Amen.

Chaos founded the band Scum with black metal icons Samoth and Cosmocrator from Zyklon, Bård Faust from Emperor, and Happy Tom from Turbonegro. Scum eventually released an album, 2005's Gospels for the Sick, which was nominated in the metal category at Norway's 2006 Alarm Awards.

In 2005, Chaos recorded a song for No End in Sight, an album by This Is Menace. Amen was then meant to tour with the band, but all dates were canceled when Chaos had to undergo emergency surgery to repair multiple ruptured hernias. When he got out of hospital, Amen joined the band Sick of It All to fulfill its European tour commitment.

Chaos was part of the supergroup Ross Robinson assembled to write the soundtrack for the House of Shock documentary. The documentary is yet to be released.

== Personal life and death ==
In 2012, Chaos was arrested for allegedly driving his car into 15 parked cars in Studio City, California. In June 2019, he was arrested again for allegedly assaulting a woman at his Los Angeles home.

Chaos died from a heart attack in his Laurel Canyon home on December 20, 2024, at the age of 59. He was said to have been suffering from underlying heart issues, poor circulation and high blood pressure just before his death. He was cremated three days later at the Valhalla Memorial Park Cemetery in North Hollywood.

== Discography ==
=== With Amen ===
Albums

- Slave (1994), Drag-u-la Records
- Amen (1999), Roadrunner Records
- We Have Come for Your Parents (2000), Virgin Records
- Death Before Musick (2004), EatURMusic/Columbia
- Gun of a Preacher Man (2005 live album), Snapper Music/Secret Records

EPs

- Uncontrolled Music for a Controlled Society (1999), Roadrunner Records
- Coma America (1999) Roadrunner Records
- Frontline Volume 3 – The Singles Club (1999, split with Misfits), Roadrunner Records
- Propamenda (2000), Virgin Records
- The Price of Reality (2000), Virgin Records/This Is An I Am Recording!
- Too Hard to Be Free (2000), Virgin Records
- The Waiting 18 (2001), Virgin Records/This Is An I Am Recording!
- California's Bleeding (2004), EatURMusic/Columbia

=== With Disorderly Conduct ===
- Amen (1986), Dirge Records

=== With Scum ===
- Gospels for the Sick (2006) (Dogjob/Candlelight Records)

=== Solo ===
- Pisstory: A Catalogue of Accidents, a Lifetime of Mistakes (2005), Refuse Music

=== Other ===
Soundtrack credits

- Faust: Love of the Damned (2000, film)
- Final Destination (2000, film)
- Atop the Fourth Wall (2012, TV series)
- House of Shock (2013, documentary)
- One Hit Wonderland (2015, TV series)
- Roll Red Roll (2018, Documentary)

Compilation inclusions

- Disorderly Conduct – I'm Buck Naked! (1984), BCT
- Disorderly Conduct – Flipside Vinyl Fanzine 2 (1985), Gasatanka Records
- Disorderly Conduct – There's a Method to Our Madness (1986), Phantom Records
- Amen – Launch (2000, video compilation), Launch Magazine
- Casey Chaos – Rise Above: 24 Black Flag Songs to Benefit the West Memphis Three (2002), Sanctuary Records
- Amen – Join, or Die (2003), Refuse Music
- Amen – Here's the Poison (2016), Secret Records

Guest appearances

- Rikk Agnew – Turtle (1992), Triple X Records
- Christian Death – Iconologic (1992), Triple X Records
- Christian Death – Sleepless Nights Live 1990 (1993), Cleopatra Records
- Queens of the Stone Age – Songs for the Deaf (2002, as guest DJ), Interscope Records
- This Is Menace – No End In Sight (2005), PSI Records
- Christian Death – Death Club (2005, compilation), Cleopatra Records
- Ministry / Paul Barker – Fix (2012), Gigantic Pictures

DVDs

- Amen – Caught in the Act (2004, live), Secret Records
- Christian Death featuring Rozz Williams – Live (2005), Cleopatra Records
- Ministry / Paul Barker – Fix (2012), Gigantic Pictures
