= Spit It Out (Slipknot song) =

Single by Slipknot

from the album Slipknot
- B-side: "Surfacing" (live); "Wait and Bleed" (live)
- Released: September 19, 2000
- Recorded: October 1998
- Studio: Indigo Ranch in Malibu, California
- Genre: Nu metal; rap metal
- Length: 2:39
- Label: Roadrunner
- Songwriters: Shawn Crahan; Chris Fehn; Paul Gray; Craig Jones; Joey Jordison; Corey Taylor; Mick Thomson; Sid Wilson
- Producers: Ross Robinson; Sean McMahon

Slipknot singles chronology
"Wait and Bleed" (1999)	"Spit It Out" (2000)	"Left Behind" (2001)

EU promo single cover

Music video
- "Spit it Out" on YouTube

"Spit It Out" is a song by American heavy metal band Slipknot, released as the second and final single from the band's 1999 self-titled debut album.

In 2019, Joe Smith-Engelhardt of Alternative Press included the song in his list of "Top 10 nü-metal staples that still hold up today".

== Background ==
Originally, "Spit It Out" was recorded as the leading track in the 1998 demo of the band's self-titled album. They initially intended to re-record it for the final release, resulting in the faster "over-caffinated" remix, and the slower "Stamp You Out" remix. Unsatisfied with their later attempts, they decided that they "could not capture the magic of [the original] recording" and opted to use the original demo recording in the final release.

== Style ==
Rick Anderson of AllMusic described the song as a "speed rap metal song".

== Release and reception ==
There was a dispute over the release of this song as the band and album's first single. While deciding which track to release, guitarist Mick Thomson and percussionist Shawn Crahan were reportedly very enthusiastic about releasing "Surfacing" as the next single. "Spit It Out" was chosen to be released. The song reached number 28 in the UK Singles Chart. In 2020, Kerrang and Louder Sound both ranked the song number eight on their lists of the greatest Slipknot songs.

== Appearance in media ==
- The song was featured on the soundtrack on the video game Evolution Snowboarding.
- American rappers XXXTentacion and Ski Mask the Slump God sampled the song in 2017 for the compilation album Members Only, Vol. 3.

== Music video ==
A music video was made for "Spit It Out". The video was directed by Thomas Mignone and consists of cuts between a live performance of the song and a band homage of the 1980 horror film The Shining, with Joey Jordison as Danny Torrance; Shawn Crahan and Chris Fehn as the Grady Twins; Corey Taylor as Jack Torrance; Mick Thomson as Lloyd the Bartender; Paul Gray as Harry Derwent; Anthony Stevens as Roger; Craig Jones as Dick Hallorann; Jim Root as Wendy Torrance; and Sid Wilson as Lorraine Massey. The Shining sequences for the video were shot at the Villa Carlotta, in Hollywood, California, and were art directed by Chris Jordan and Robert Piser. This music video was banned from MTV, for various violent depictions, including Corey Taylor's smashing through a door with an axe (a spoof of the "Here's Johnny!" scene) and the scene where James Root viciously assaults Corey Taylor with a bat. A re-edited, less violent version was subsequently aired on MTV. At one point during Slipknot's live performance, a fan can be seen wearing a Soulfly shirt – Taylor would later collaborate with the band for their track "Jumpdafuckup" on their 2000 album Primitive.

"Spit It Out" came out in MTV's return of the rock compilation.

== Track listing ==
All songs written by Slipknot.
CD single / Japan promo CD single

1. "Spit It Out" – 2:41
2. "Surfacing" (live) – 3:46
3. "Wait and Bleed" (live) – 2:45
- Includes "Spit It Out" music video

7" single

1. "Spit It Out" – 2:41
2. "Surfacing" (live) – 3:46

EU promo CD single

1. "Spit It Out" – 2:39
- Includes "Spit It Out" music video

US promo CD single (1999)

1. "Spit It Out" (edit) – 2:40
2. "Call-Out Hook" – 0:12

UK promo CD single

1. "Spit It Out" (edit) – 2:41
2. "Surfacing" (live) – 3:46
3. "Wait and Bleed" (live) – 2:45

US promo CD single (2000) / Poland cassette single

1. "Spit It Out" – 2:41
2. "Surfacing" (live) – 3:46
3. "Wait and Bleed" (live) – 2:45

Japan promo cassette single

1. "Spit It Out"

== Personnel ==
=== Slipknot ===
All tracks produced by Slipknot

- (#8) Corey Taylor – vocals
- (#7) Mick Thomson – guitar
- (#6) Shawn Crahan – percussion
- (#5) Craig Jones – samples, media
- (#4) Josh Brainard – guitar
- (#3) Greg Welts – percussion
- (#2) Paul Gray – bass
- (#1) Joey Jordison – drums, mixing
- (#0) Sid Wilson – turntables

=== Production ===
- Sean McMahon – engineering, mixing
- Steve Remote – engineering on "Surfacing" (live) and "Wait and Bleed" (live)
- Jay Baumgardner – mixing on "Surfacing" (live) and "Wait and Bleed" (live)

== Charts ==
Weekly chart performance for "Spit It Out"
Chart (2001)	Peak position
Australia (ARIA)	99
Scottish Singles Sales (Official Charts)	26
UK Singles (Official Charts)	28
UK Rock & Metal (Official Charts)	1

== Certifications ==
Certifications and sales for "Spit It Out"
Region	Certification	Certified units/sales
Canada (Music Canada)	Gold	40,000^{‡}
New Zealand (RMNZ)	Gold	15,000^{‡}
United Kingdom (BPI)	Silver	200,000^{‡}
^{‡} Sales+streaming figures based on certification alone.
