= Time to Burn (XCOMM album) =

2026 studio album by XCOMM

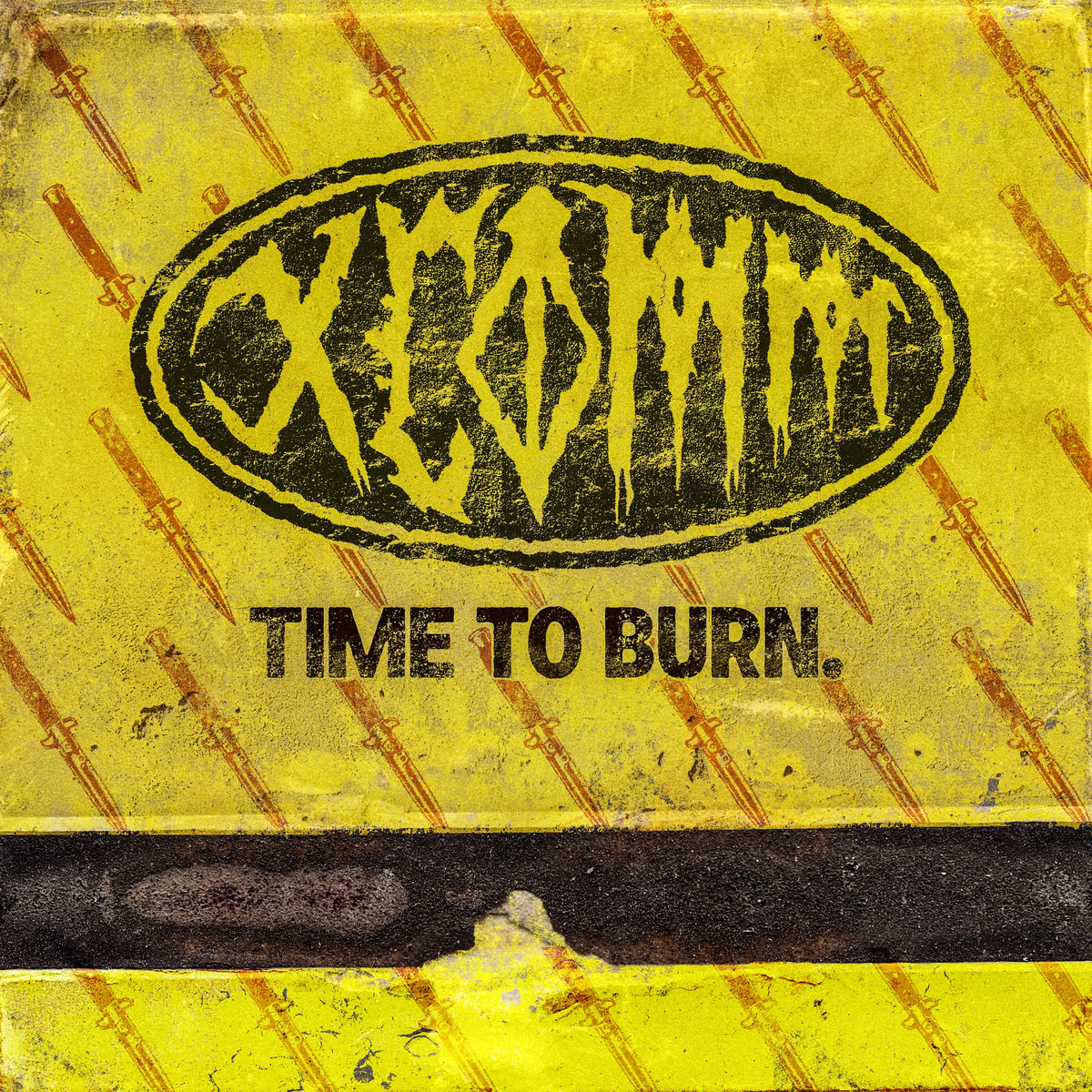

Studio album by XCOMM
- Released: May 22, 2026
- Recorded: Venice, Los Angeles, U.S.
- Genre: Hardcore punk, punk rock
- Label: Blowed Out
- Producer: Ross Robinson

XCOMM chronology
Westside Punks (2024)	Time to Burn (2026)

Singles from Time to Burn
- 1. "Reasons" Released: September 17, 2025; 2. "Time to Burn" Released: November 11, 2025; 3. "Fake ID" Released: January 15, 2026; 4. "Hot Pursuit / One and Nothing" Released: February 27, 2026; 5. "Borrowed Happiness" Released: April 8, 2026

Time to Burn is the debut studio album by the American hardcore punk band XCOMM, released through Blowed Out Records on May 22 2026. The album was produced by Ross Robinson. The album features a contribute by rapper and singer Ghostemane. It is the band's first album, and has incursions with crossover thrash, thrash metal, and skate punk.

== Background ==
XCOMM first announced the production of the album in early 2025 after signing to Blowed Out Records, a label founded by record producer Ross Robinson, rapper Ghostemane, and Bill Armstrong.

XCOMM released a single, titled "Reasons", on September 17 2025. It is the first track written for Time to Burn. They later released their second single "Time to Burn", the title track of their upcoming first album, on November 11 2025. It is the third track of Time to Burn and is the follow-up single to "Reasons". They later released Fake ID. It was released on January 15 2026 and is the third single and track on this album. Afterwards, they released the single "Hot Pursuit, One and Nothing". It was released on 27 February 2026. It is also the second track of this album and the band's fourth single. "Borrowed Happiness" is the final single released before their first album, Time to Burn, is finished. It was released on April 8, 2026, along with the announcement of the album.

“Ross would get me to drink these really potent ginger shots, like, huge ginger shots, to get me crying, and then just put me in the booth, push all my buttons and lock the door on me. I’d be screaming my ass off, doing 10-hour days, and each time I would get better and better.”

— Michael Gatto

Prior to the recording, Robinson made lead vocalist and guitarist Michael Gatto take ginger shots to induce crying, which Gatto credited with improving his performance over time.

Drummer Revel Ian described being in the studio with Robinson: "We sat behind our instruments, shared our deepest darkest secrets, and then continued to beat our instruments with each strum and stroke packed with unfiltered emotion."

“Ross Robinson transformed us into musical weapons that will blow your head off when you play our record,” Ian stated. “I’ll forever be grateful for having the opportunity to record this album,” Gatto added. “The whole process from tracking to mixing was truly incredible.” Ross Robinson nicknamed their sessions “daycare” after realizing “how important the pulse of youth truly is” during the recording process.

== Track listing ==
All tracks written by XCOMM.

No.	Title	Length
1.	"Reasons"	2:39
2.	"Hot Pursuit / One and Nothing"	4:21
3.	"Fake ID"	2:06
4.	"Borrowed Happiness"	2:53
5.	"Time To Burn"	1:21
6.	"Pirates" (featuring Ghostemane)	2:33
7.	"Running Zeroes"	3:18
8.	"Relevance"	3:14
9.	"No Teeth"	3:18
10.	"Purity"	1:20
11.	"Negativity"	3:20

== Personnel ==
XCOMM

- Michael Gatto – lead vocals, guitar
- Jay Vargas – guitar
- Adan Escoto – bass
- Revel Ian – drums
- Hunter Grogan – turntables, samples

=== Production ===
- Ross Robinson – production, engineering
