= Ex-Idols =

American band

The Ex-Idols
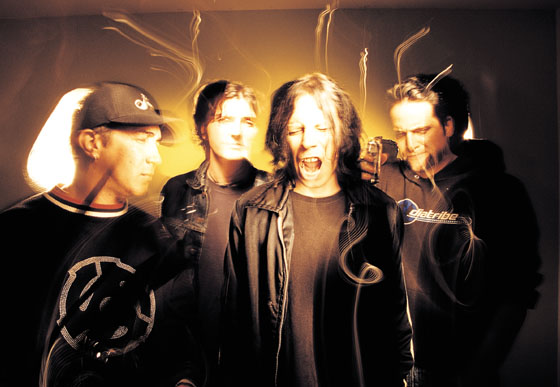
- The Ex-Idols left to right: Sean DeMott, Lance Porter, Gary "X" Finneran, Duke Decter

Background information
- Origin: Los Angeles, California, United States
- Genres: Rock
- Years active: 1992–1998
- Labels: Relativity Records, Sony Music Entertainment
- Past members: Gary "X" Finneran; Duke Decter; Sean E DeMott; Lance Porter; Keith Kessinger
- Website: www.ex-idols.com

The Ex-Idols were an American band formed in Los Angeles, California in 1992 by "Gary X" (Gary "X" Finneran), Keith Kessinger, Sean DeMott, and Lance Porter. Originating in the Los Angeles / Hollywood underground rock clubs, the band quickly gained interest due to their songwriting and vocalist Gary X. Within their first year of forming the band signed with Relativity Records, established a publishing deal with (BMI), and replaced original guitar player with notable punk guitarist Duke Decter due to artistic differences. The band was short-lived due to the chemical dependencies among the band members resulting in the suicide/death of singer/songwriter Gary X.

== History ==
One of the founding artists of the neo-punk movement in the early 1990s, The Ex-Idols were quickly signed by Sony Music Entertainment/Relativity Records in 1992 and released their CD single "Pill Popper" in 1993. The 4-song CD, also available in 7" vinyl form, includes one unreleased song "And I Was You." Later in the same year Relativity Records released the first full-length CD by The Ex-Idols entitled "Social Kill" and released the first video for the self-titled track "Social Kill' directed by Jodi Wille. The Social Kill video appeared on MTV and VH1. The official single for the album was entitled "Go Away" and was written by guitarist Duke Decter. The single received heavy rotation radio play in all five major markets of the US: New York City, Chicago, Atlanta, San Francisco and Los Angeles. In 1994 Sony released the second video for the album in support of the single "Go Away" and put the band on tour. The Ex-Idols toured throughout the United States with support acts Total Chaos, NOFX, and UK Subs. In 1995 Relativity Records folded and the band was approached by Epitaph Records for their second album but were unable to negotiate a deal. The 2nd Ex-Idols album was entitled Who We Are and was later released independently by Refuse Music. The Ex-Idols broke up as a band in 1998 and moved in separate directions. Guitarist Duke Decter was picked up by RCA Records and toured with alternative artist Tim Skold, formerly of KMFDM and then Marilyn Manson. Bassist and drummer Sean DeMott and Lance Porter joined Frosted, the solo act of The Go-Go's guitarist Jane Weidlin. Singer/songwriter Gary X continued playing his own music in his own band Tuscaurora. In May, 2009, he was found dead in his hotel room due to suicide. He left behind three sons. Decter later joined up with his childhood bandmate Casey Chaos. In 2009, The Ex-Idols had a song from their 2nd album entitled "Fuck Everyone" appear on the television series Rescue Me (U.S. TV series) starring Denis Leary.

== Band members ==
Former members

- Gary "X" Finneran – lead vocals (1992–1998); died 2009
- Duke Decter – guitars (1993–1998)
- Sean E DeMott – bass(1992–1998)
- Lance Porter – drums(1992–1998)
- Keith Kessinger – guitars (1992–1993)

== Discography ==
- 1993 PILL POPPER CD – Relativity Records
- 1993 PILL POPPER 7" Vinyl – Relativity Records
- 1994 SOCIAL KILL CD – Relativity Records
- 1994 GO AWAY SINGLE CD – Relativity Records
- 1998 WHOWEARE CD – Relativity Records (unreleased)

== Videography ==
- 1994 SOCIAL KILL directed by Jodi Wille
- 1995 GO AWAY directed by Jodi Wille

== Television appearances ==
- 2009 Rescue Me (Season 5 Episode 15)
