= Swollen Teeth =

American nu metal band

- Origin: Unknown
- Genre: Nu metal
- Years active: 2023–present
- Label: Blowed Out
- Members: Megaa; Sun; Skutch; HOG
- Website: swollenteeth.com

Swollen Teeth is an American nu metal band which they are known for their anonymous identity. Their current line up consists of Megaa (vocals, turntables, samples), Sun (vocals, bass), Skutch (drums, percussion), and HOG (guitar). The band is currently signed and is the first band to sign to Blowed Out Records, a label founded by producer Ross Robinson, Bill Armstrong, and rapper Ghostemane.

The band released their self-titled debut EP containing 5 singles in 2023, which are titled "Empty", "Car Crash", "Bike Ride", "Swollenteeth", and "Lethal". The EP was produced by American DJ, keyboardist, and record producer Sid Wilson, a longtime and current member/DJ of nu metal band Slipknot.

They later released their first album, Ask Nothing, in September 5, 2025, featuring a chaotic and aggressive sound. The album was co-produced by producers Ross Robinson and Sid Wilson. The lead singles of the album are "Foster" and "Unite."

The band is managed by Evan Kandilakis and Scott Enright from Seek Management. The booking agency representation is Scott Sokol and pinnacle entertainment. Through this partnership, Swollen Teeth has performed at bonnaroo music festival, Milwaukee metal festival, New England metal and hardcore festival, inkcarceration festival and FEQ Quebec, as well as touring as support for biohazard, onyx, and upon a burning body. These festival and tour dates have been in both the USA and Canada from 2023-2026.

== History ==
The band was "discovered" by Wilson through "the edge of the internet," which led to him producing their work at his farm studio in Iowa. Before their formal debut, the band spent "countless hours in the lab" and made small live appearances.
