= XCOMM =

American hardcore punk band

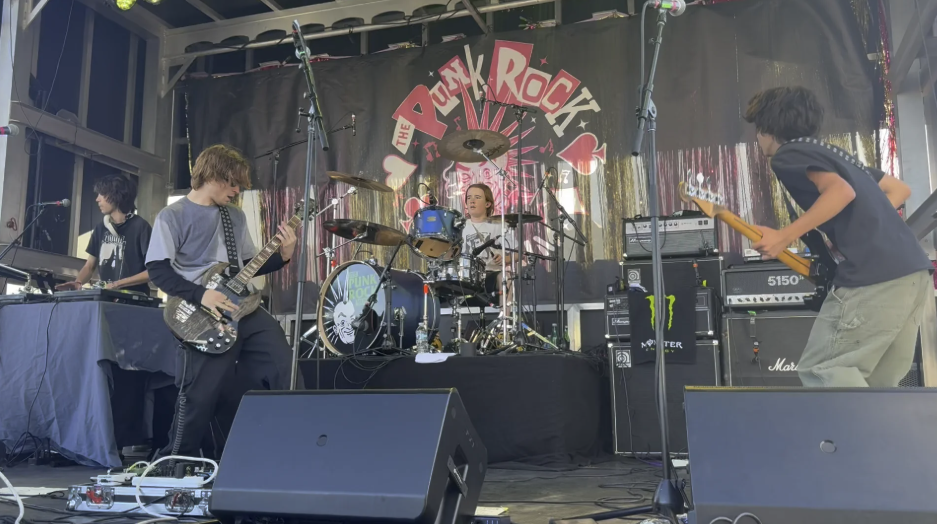
- XCOMM performing at Las Vegas. From left to right: Hunter Grogan, Michael Gatto, Revel Ian, Jay Vargas

Background information
- Origin: Venice, Los Angeles, California, U.S.
- Genres: Hardcore punk
- Years active: 2023–present
- Label: Blowed Out
- Members: Michael Gatto; Jay Vargas; Adan Escoto; Revel Ian; Hunter Grogan
- Past members: Erek Gracias
- Website: xcommpunx.com

XCOMM (short for Excommunication) is an American hardcore punk band from Venice, Los Angeles, formed in May 2023 by drummer Revel Ian. Their current line up consists of Revel Young Ian (drums), Michael Gatto (vocals, guitar, former member of 2dust), Adan Escoto (bass), Jay Vargas (guitar), and Hunter Grogan (DJ, sampler). The lineage ranges from teenagers to young adults. The band is currently signed to Blowed Out Records, a label founded by producer Ross Robinson, Ghostemane, and Bill Armstrong.

XCOMM released their debut single, "Reasons", on September 17, 2025. The single was produced by producer Ross Robinson. It is also the first track/single on their upcoming album, Time to Burn. Although the band released an EP called Westside Punks in July 2024, many music publications cited "Reasons" as their debut single. They later released their second single "Time to Burn", the title track of their upcoming first album, on November 11, 2025. Like their first single and album, it was produced by Robinson.

Their first release of 2026 is the single "Fake ID". It was released on January 15, 2026 and is their third single. It features an aggressive and "80s-thrashy" chorus. Again, it was produced by Robinson. Their second release of 2026 is the single "Hot Pursuit, One and Nothing". It was released on February 27, 2026 and is their fourth single. "Borrowed Happiness" is the final single released before their first album, Time to Burn, is finished. Time to Burn is scheduled on May 22, 2026. It was released on April 8, 2026, alongside the official announcement of the Time To Burn album.

== History ==
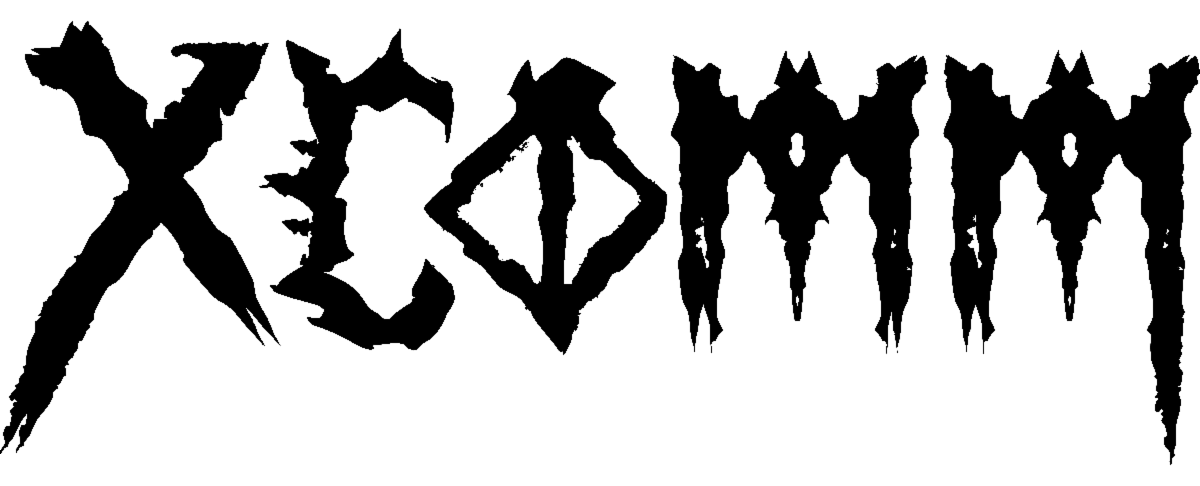
The XCOMM logo, incorporated chiefly to single/album covers since the release of "Reasons" (single)

=== Formation, early years, and Westside Punks (2023–2024) ===
Ian originally wanted to call the band "Excommunicado" after hearing a term used in John Wick: Chapter 4. After realizing it was too long, ("Excommunicado" has 6 syllables) he considered "No Communication", before abbreviating it to XCOMM. Ian recruited his friend Adan Escoto on bass and Escoto's friend, Erek Gracias on guitar. While they began practicing, they soon realized Gracias was not the right person for the band. After a hiatus, Ian and Escoto reunited, hoping to find a lead vocalist or a guitarist. They played their first live show together in March 2024 in Venice, California.

While searching for a frontman, Ian posted a flyer through his Instagram account. The same following day, Michael Gatto, who was (now formerly) in the band 2dust, responded to the advertisement and was recruited as the lead vocalist and guitarist. The band played together as a trio before eventually noticing Vargas from the same area. Vargas had been recruited as the second guitarist in April 2024 and played his first show with them on the same month.

Drummer Roy Mayorga produced Westside Punks. The EP was recorded at Secret Hand Studios in Van Nuys, California. It was engineered by an audio technician credited as Cameron, while the cover art was visualized by Steve Layani.

=== Signing to Blowed Out and Time to Burn (2025–present) ===
Briefly, Gatto called Robinson, a friend of Gatto's girlfriend's uncle, asking him to watch the band practice. Robinson was impressed by their rehearsal performance and decided to sign XCOMM to Blowed Out Records. Later, in late 2025, they found Hunter Grogan through the local Venice music scene and decided to recruit him. Before Grogan was recruited, he was known in the electronic and DJ scene for spinning and playing jungle music. The band decided to recruit him because of his ability to manipulate tape and samples, and to add textures. XCOMM's first studio album, Time To Burn, was recorded with Robinson producing and is scheduled for release on May 22, 2026. One of the tracks, "Pirates," feature a contribution by rapper Ghostemane. Prior to the recording, Robinson made Gatto take ginger shots to induce crying which Gatto credited with improving his performance.

They have also been invited to perform at the Warped Tour, (2026) has played at the Sick New World festival, and opened for rock band Foo Fighters at the Kia Forum.

Their song "Borrowed Happiness" was featured in the 2026 film Jackass: Best and Last.

== Musical style ==
XCOMM was described as "tight, loud, and heavy with ripping guitars and an intense rhythm section" by Carlos Ramirez in No Echo. The band frequently fuse hardcore punk with 80s thrash, punk-thrash, (crossover thrash) and skate punk elements. Their major influences are from hardcore punk/crossover thrash bands Suicidal Tendencies, Minor Threat, Discharge, and Black Flag.

=== Lyrics ===
Many of XCOMM songs are about teenage frustration, restlessness, pushing forward while collapsing, and/or social exclusion as shown in singles "Fake ID" and "Reasons". "Reasons" was written about being pressured by societal/personal expectations, while "Fake ID" was written about not being allowed in venues for being under the age of 21, despite the venues they tried to enter were for all ages. Most of the members are also still minors and under the age of 18.

== Band members ==
=== Current members ===
- Michael Gatto – lead vocals, guitar
- Jay Vargas – guitar
- Adan Escoto – bass
- Revel Ian – drums, percussion
- Hunter Grogan – turntables, samples

== Discography ==
- Time to Burn (2026)

=== Singles & EPs ===
Title	Year	Type
"Westside Punks"	2024	EP
"Reasons"	2025	Single
"Time to Burn"	2025	Single
"Fake ID"	2026	Single
"Hot Pursuit, One and Nothing"	2026	Single
"Borrowed Happiness"	2026	Single
