= Ross Robinson =

American record producer (born 1967)

- Also known as: The Godfather of Nu Metal
- Born: February 13, 1967 (age 59); Angleton, Texas, U.S.
- Genres: Nu metal; heavy metal; punk rock; groove metal; death metal; post-hardcore; indie rock; alternative rock; emo; rap metal; alternative metal; rap rock; thrash metal
- Occupation: Record producer
- Years active: 1991–present

Ross Montgomery Robinson (born February 13, 1967) is an American record producer, best known for his discovery and work with rock/metal acts such as Korn, Glassjaw, The Blood Brothers, Slipknot, and Limp Bizkit. His work with many of the acts afforded him the moniker, "The Godfather of Nu Metal." He has also produced and worked with other artists, including Tech N9ne, The Cure, Sepultura, and many others.

== Early life ==
Ross Montgomery Robinson was born in Brazoria County, Texas on February 13, 1967 to Robert Alden "Bob" Robinson and inspirational speaker Byron Kathleen Mitchell (née Reid), better known as Byron Katie. Robinson was raised in Needles, California until third grade, when his parents divorced, and he moved with his mother and siblings to Las Vegas,

== Career ==
=== Early career (1980s-1993) ===
Robinson began as a thrash metal guitarist for the bands Détente and Murdercar and picked up his knowledge of producing from the studios where his band recorded demos and also worked at Blackie Lawless's studio in Burbank, California. Robinson received his first production job for the 1991 Fear Factory album Concrete. Robinson would use the album as a showcase of sorts in helping him land producing slots with other acts, particularly the up-and-coming band Korn.

=== Rise of nu metal and post-hardcore (1994–2002) ===
Robinson is regarded as "The Godfather of Nu Metal", along with Korn frontman Jonathan Davis, despite denouncing the nu metal movement later on for becoming complacent and the newer bands for not expanding on the style that he helped create with Korn's first album, Korn (1994). In 1999, Robinson produced Slipknot's self-titled debut and Machine Head's The Burning Red.

Robinson has also been successful in the post-hardcore genre, producing At the Drive-In's album, Relationship of Command in 2000, as well as Glassjaw's albums, Everything You Ever Wanted to Know About Silence (2000) and Worship and Tribute (2002).

=== Present day (2003-present) ===
In 2003 he produced The Blood Brothers' ...Burn, Piano Island, Burn, which was a departure for both the band and Robinson. In contrast to The Blood Brothers' previously raw, often under-produced songs (which lasted as short as 90 seconds at times), ...Burn, Piano Island, Burn featured much longer and more complex compositions. The same year, Robinson worked with The Cure on their eponymous album (2004) and From First to Last on their album Heroine (2006).

Robinson was the owner of the IAM: Wolfpack label. In 2007 it was announced that he was starting a new label IAM: Wolfpack, which released the debut CD from Black Light Burns titled Cruel Melody. He is a co-owner of semi-private NY nightclub The Plumm, along with David Wells, Jesse Bradford, Noel Ashman and others.

From 2008, Robinson decided to produce new talents he discovered via Myspace. He recorded and mixed a young French trio called My Own Private Alaska, which mixes classical piano and scream based vocals. Their Amen album was released on March 1, 2010, through his label I Am Recordings.

He worked with the Slovenian band Siddharta on their new project Saga. He also produced Repeater's second album, We Walk from Safety.

Robinson has been producing indie rock bands such British bands Klaxons and Dananananaykroyd. In late 2008, the Luxembourgish dance rock band INBORN! were approached by Robinson. Having heard the band on the net, he offered to record their first official long player. The band entered Robinson's studio on October 1, 2010. The same year, Robinson returned to produce Korn's ninth album, 14 years after last working with band. Korn wanted to recapture the raw energy of the first two albums which Robinson produced.

In 2013, Robinson produced Tech N9ne's rock EP Therapy and would also work with Sepultura for their 2013 album The Mediator Between Head and Hands Must Be the Heart.

As of 2017, he has recently worked with The Used, Suicide Silence, and Frank Iero and the Patience among others.

Robinson had a minor role in producing Limp Bizkit's sixth studio album, then titled Stampede of the Disco Elephants, however such contributions were later discarded after the album's refactoring and 2021 release.

== As a musician ==
- Detente – Recognize No Authority (1986) (guitar)
- Murdercar – unreleased album (1990) (guitar)

== Albums produced ==
- Concrete – Fear Factory (1991)
- The Crimson Idol – W.A.S.P. (1992) (engineer)
- Creep – Creep (1993)
- Neidermayer's Mind – Korn (1993)
- Korn – Korn (1994)
- Feed-Us – Cradle of Thorns (1994)
- Adrenaline – Deftones (1995) (production on "Fist")
- Injected – Phunk Junkeez (1995)
- Roots – Sepultura (1996)
- All Is Not Well – Manhole (1996)
- Life Is Peachy – Korn (1996)
- E-lux - Human Waste Project (1997)
- Three Dollar Bill, Y'all – Limp Bizkit (1997)
- Soulfly – Soulfly (1998)
- Cold – Cold (1998)
- Hard to Swallow – Vanilla Ice (1998)
- Strangeland (1998) (production on "Absent")
- Slipknot – Slipknot (1999)
- The Burning Red – Machine Head (1999)
- Amen – Amen (1999)
- Everything You Ever Wanted to Know About Silence – Glassjaw (2000)
- Relationship of Command – At the Drive-In (2000)
- We Have Come for Your Parents – Amen (2000)
- Iowa – Slipknot (2001)
- Start with a Strong and Persistent Desire – Vex Red (2002)
- Concrete – Fear Factory (re-released 2002)
- Worship and Tribute – Glassjaw (2002)
- Alive! – Snot (2002) (production on "Choose What?")
- ...Burn, Piano Island, Burn – The Blood Brothers (2003)
- Join, or Die – Amen (2003)
- The Cure – The Cure (2004)
- Rule 3: Conceal Your Intentions – Septembre (2004)
- Team Sleep – Team Sleep (2005) (production on "Blvrd. Nights" and "Live from the Stage")
- The Unquestionable Truth (Part 1) – Limp Bizkit (2005)
- Heroine – From First to Last (2006)
- Redeemer – Norma Jean (2006)
- Wolves – Idiot Pilot (2007)
- Worse Than a Fairy Tale – Drop Dead, Gorgeous (2007)
- Cruel Melody – Black Light Burns (2007) (mixing on "Mesopotamia")
- The Anti Mother – Norma Jean (Aug 2008)
- Saga – Siddharta (2009)
- Korn III: Remember Who You Are – Korn (2010)
- Surfing the Void – Klaxons (2010)
- Amen - My Own Private Alaska (2010)
- PERSONA – INBORN! (2011)
- There Is a Way – Dananananaykroyd (2011)
- Birth, School, Work, Death – Hyro Da Hero (2011)
- We Walk from Safety – Repeater (2011)
- Anthems of the Hero – Kraddy (2011)
- VI – Siddharta (2011)
- Haria – Berri Txarrak (2011)
- abcdefghijklmnoprstuwxyz – semantik punk (2012)
- Therapy EP – Tech N9ne (2013)
- The Mediator Between Head and Hands Must Be the Heart – Sepultura (2013)
- The Drone – We Are Knuckle Dragger (2013)
- Blood Maker EP – Wild Throne (2014)
- Denbora da poligrafo bakarra – Berri Txarrak (2014)
- My Dreams Dictate My Reality – Soko (2015)
- Searching for Zero – Cancer Bats (2015)
- Harvest of Darkness – Wild Throne (2015)
- Only Ghosts – Red Fang (2016)
- II – De La Tierra (2016)
- A New Wave of Violence - Head Wound City (2016)
- Into the Vanishing Light – Night Verses (2016)
- Parachutes - Frank Iero and the Patience (2016)
- Suicide Silence – Suicide Silence (2017)
- Dead Cross – Dead Cross (2017)
- The Canyon – The Used (2017)
- Everything Is Fine - Amigo the Devil (2018)
- Lament – Touché Amoré (2020)
- ANTI-ICON - Ghostemane (2020)
- II - Dead Cross (2022)
- Sólo D'Lira - Molotov (2023)
- Spiral in a Straight Line – Touché Amoré (2024)
- Ask Nothing – Swollen Teeth (2025)
- Time to Burn – XCOMM (2026)
- Terraform the Afterlife - Evil Island (2026)
