= Evolution Snowboarding =

2002 video game

- North American cover art for the PlayStation 2 version of the game
- Developer: Konami Computer Entertainment Osaka
- Publisher: Konami
- Platforms: PlayStation 2, GameCube
- Release: PlayStation 2: NA: November 25, 2002; JP: January 16, 2003; PAL: April 11, 2003; GameCube: NA: February 25, 2003; PAL: March 28, 2003
- Genre: Snowboarding
- Modes: Single-player, multiplayer

Evolution Snowboarding is a 2002 snowboarding video game both developed and published by Japanese game company Konami. The game takes a new perspective on the snowboarding genre. It is the sequel to Evolution Skateboarding.

== Plot ==
The game centers around the player character receiving an email to investigate a certain ski resort. After picking one of four player models, the game begins with the player escaping the resort after being attacked by unknown thugs, called "Boardroids". Upon escaping the facility, Danny Kass meets the player in an area called Boom Town, an oil field taken over by a mysterious corporation. The player discovers that the Earth's climate has been changed dramatically by this corporation, and teams up with Kass to regain Boom Town. Upon progressing, the player encounters a chainsaw wielding man, Boomer, who the player kills to liberate Boom Town.

From there, the player proceeds to Falls and Creeks, a snowy area where the enemy has taken over. The player finds and kills Fall, the enemy leader of the area, allowing the player to progress to Bat City. The player progresses around the world to learn that an unnamed corporation, simply known as "Big Core", has rapidly shifted the Earth's climate.

The player travels around different locations and breaks Big Core's control over the region by executing the boss character of that area. Along the way, the player allies themselves with professional snowboarders including Travis Rice, Rio Tahara, Bjorn Leines, and others.

After defeating each areas bosses, the player travels to the Big Core itself and destroys the cause of the climate change. The Earth is restored to its natural climates and the player escapes the Big Core.

== Gameplay ==
Evolution Snowboarding uses a combination of snowboarding and combat skills to complete certain tasks and defeat enemies. Players can use punches, kicks, weapons, grabs, and board tricks to battle the Big Core's minions.

Weapons can be found throughout the levels of the game. Weapons include spiked bats, chains, and others. The player may also use the board itself to directly or indirectly attack foes.

=== Character creation and customization ===
In "Evolution Mode" (The Career mode), the player chooses a player character, their characteristics, and their name to begin with. Then, as he/she progresses throughout the game, they earn points by doing challenges to boost the character's traits and skills. Gear can also be purchased to customize entire board and rider setup. Also, throughout the levels there are clothes scattered all around that can be equipped to the rider at the end of the level.

=== Multiplayer ===
The game features an offline only, split-screen multiplayer mode. This mode allows two players to choose from any of the pro boarders in the game and compete against each other in multiple game types. Game types include timed races, point battles, and item collection battles.

== Music ==
Music from the game includes artists such as: Slipknot, Stone Sour, Murderdolls, Goneblind, Killswitch Engage, Chimaira, 36 Crazyfists, and Five Pointe 0. This music was put in the game to match up with the plot's dark and violent tone.

=== List ===
- Slipknot - "Spit It Out"
- Goneblind - "Rescue Me"
- Killswitch Engage - "Life to Lifeless"
- Murderdolls - "Dead in Hollywood"
- Chimaira - "Let Go"
- 36 Crazyfists - "One More Word"
- Stone Sour - "Get Inside"
- Five Pointe 0 - "Breathe Machine"

== Reception ==
Reception

Aggregate score
Aggregator	Score	
Aggregator	GameCube	PS2
Metacritic	49 / 100	38 / 100

Review scores
Publication	Score	
Publication	GameCube	PS2
Famitsu	N/A	30 / 40
GamesMaster	23%	23%
GameSpot	5.9 / 10	6 / 10
GameSpy	1/5	1/5
IGN	3.4 / 10	2 / 10
NGC Magazine	23%	N/A
Nintendo Power	2.6 / 5	N/A
PlayStation Official Magazine – UK	N/A	2 / 10
Official U.S. PlayStation Magazine	N/A	1/5
PlayStation: The Official Magazine	N/A	3 / 10

Evolution Snowboarding received "generally unfavorable reviews" according to the review aggregation website Metacritic. Reviewing the GameCube version, GameSpot criticized the game for its "sluggish" controls, "bland" visuals, and a relatively low difficulty. In Japan, however, Famitsu gave the PlayStation 2 version a score of 30 out of 40.

== See also ==
- Evolution Skateboarding
- Konami
