= Vex Red =

British rock band

- Origin: Aldershot, England, UK
- Genres: Industrial rock, industrial metal, alternative rock, electronic rock
- Years active: 1995–2003; 2015–present
- Labels: Virgin Records, I Am
- Spinoffs: Scenes
- Members: Terry Abbott; Keith Lambert; Ant Forbes; Nick Goulding; Dave Neale
- Past members: Ash Soan; Ben Calvert; Dan Rice; Sean Buckingham

Vex Red are a band from Aldershot, England who merge hard rock with electronica.

== History ==
=== 1995-2003: Early years and Start with a Strong and Persistent Desire ===
Vex Red formed in 1995 in Aldershot, United Kingdom. The band self released two demo records in the late 1990s one titled "Vex Red" released in 1998 and the second "Sleep Does Nothing for You" the following year. Original band members were Sean Buckingham, Anthony Forbes, Keith Lambert, Nick Goulding and Dan Rice. In 1999 the band fired Buckingham and recruited vocalist and guitarist Terry Abbott to complete the line up. Entering into a demo tape competition by Kerrang! and Ross Robinson the band were quickly signed to Robinson's Virgin Records imprint, I Am.

In 2001 the band released their first single "Itch". The second single "Can't Smile" was delayed but was finally released on 18 February 2002. The single was a modest success charting at number 45 on the UK Singles Chart, spending two weeks in the top 100. The band's debut album produced by Ross Robinson, "Start with a Strong and Persistent Desire" was released on 4 March 2002. The album charted at number 48 on the UK Albums Chart and also spent two weeks on the chart.

Shortly after the release of the debut album the band were dissatisfied with their time on Robinson's I Am record label decided to leave the label. Virgin Records being in turmoil at the time led to some office closures and cuts. This coupled with the band citing wrong vocal takes being used on "Itch" and various release dates confusingly being issued for the follow-up single "Can't Smile" and the debut album, the band managed to litigate their release. In 2003 lead singer Terry Abbott departed the band, citing unhappiness in the project and his desire to work on side projects.

The band initially wished to continue without Abbott and moved on to form the alt rock outfit Scenes recruiting vocalist Fraser McGuinness. Locking themselves away in a converted Oast House Studio in Hampshire to write new material, Scenes went on to play a number of shows with artists such as Oceansize and Scan, but disbanded in early 2005.

=== 2015-present: Reformation and new music ===
The band reunited in 2015, announcing that they would be playing shows and making new music. In July 2016, they announced on their Instagram that Dave Neale formerly of Death in Vegas and Rooster would be joining the band as the new drummer.

On 5 December 2016 the band released their first new music since 2002 with the single "Burn this Place". It was also announced they would play a handful of shows UK in January 2017. In early 2018 the band played a handful of shows supporting Hell is for Heroes in celebration of the 15th Anniversary of their debut album The Neon Handshake, including a sold out show at the London O2 Shepherd's Bush Empire.

In 2018 Vex Red were one of only a handful of artists to be personally invited by Robert Smith of The Cure to play his Meltdown Festival at London’s Southbank Centre.

A new single, "Tarantula", was released in July 2019 and the band announced details of a new EP, "Give Me the Dark", to be released on 4 October 2019, of which "Tarantula" is the second single. The third and final single, "Air", was made available in late November of the same year. The band promoted their new EP with a UK only 6-date headline tour in February 2020, during which they were supported by math rock/grunge act Sœur.

== Members ==
- Terry Abbot – lead vocals, guitar
- Anthony Forbes – guitar, keyboards
- Nick Goulding – bass guitar, guitar
- Keith Lambert – bass guitar, programming
- Dave Neale – drums

=== Former members ===
- Ash Soan - drums
- Ben Calvert – drums
- Dan Rice – drums
- Sean Buckingham – vocals

== Discography ==
=== Studio albums and EPs ===
List of albums, with selected chart positions
Title	Album details	Peak chart positions		
Title	Album details	UK	UK Rock	SCO
Start with a Strong and Persistent Desire	Released: 4 March 2002; Label: I Am (CDVUS 215, 7243 8 11798 2 6); Formats: CD, LP, DL	48	3	61
Give Me the Dark [EP]	Released: 4 October 2019; Label: Say Something Records; Formats: CD, DL	-	-	-

=== Singles ===
Title	Year	Peak chart positions			Album
Title	Year	UK	UK Rock	SCO	Album
"Itch"	2001	—	—	—	Start with a Strong and Persistent Desire
"Can't Smile"	2002	45	3	50	Start with a Strong and Persistent Desire
"Burn this Place"	2016	—	—	—	Give Me the Dark [EP]
"Tarantula"	2019	—	—	—	Give Me the Dark [EP]
"Air"	2019	—	—	—	Give Me the Dark [EP]
"—" denotes a recording that did not chart or was not released in that territory.

=== Demos ===
- Vex Red (1998) [EP] [Sean Buckingham on vocals]
- Sleep Does Nothing for You (1999) [EP]

=== Non-Album Songs ===
- Between Venom and Vision
- Consider
- Vow (Live only)
- Dahlia (Live only)
- Guillotines (Live only)
