= Rule 3: Conceal Your Intentions =

Rule 3: Conceal Your Intentions E.P.

EP by Septembre
- Released: April 2004
- Recorded: 2004
- Genre: Alternative rock, post-grunge
- Length: 17:35
- Label: Sugar Shack Records
- Producer: Ross Robinson

Rule 3: Conceal Your Intentions E.P. is the debut EP by English alternative rock band Septembre. It was released on April 12, 2004 on Sugar Shack Records.

The EP peaked at #159 on the UK Album Charts.

== Track listing ==
1. "I Am Weightless" – 2:29
2. "Always" – 4:54
3. "Happy" – 4:26
4. "(Face)" – 5:46

== Trivia ==
- "I Am Weightless" was featured on the soundtrack for the game Need for Speed Underground 2 and in the unreleased beta of Need for Speed Carbon.
