= Harvest of Darkness =

Studio album by Wild Throne
- Released: October 2, 2015
- Recorded: 2014
- Studio: Ross Robinson's Home Studio (Venice Beach)
- Genre: Heavy metal, progressive metal, alternative metal
- Label: Roadrunner Records
- Producer: Ross Robinson

Harvest of Darknest is Wild Throne's debut album and was released by Roadrunner Records on October 2, 2015. The band went on a tour with Red Fang in support of the album.

== Production ==
After releasing three Eps, the band went about recording their debut album, which was produced by Veteran producer Ross Robinson.

== Reception ==
The album has gotten good reviews from Metal Sucks and Metal Injections. Michael Nelson of the website stereogum has lauded the album, calling Wild Throne peerless and are a band that do more than most bands in the career.

== Track listing ==
No.	Title	Length
1.	"Harvest of Darkness"	04:55
2.	"Shadow Deserts"	04:41
3.	"Fear Yourself"	06:13
4.	"Lone Lust"	04:28
5.	"The Death of a Star"	06:13
6.	"Blood Maker"	05:09
7.	"I of the Prism"	03:31
8.	"War Is a Romance"	03:39
9.	"Born to Die"	04:19
10.	"The Wrecking Ball Unchained"	06:17
11.	"Trans"	05:13
Total length:		54:38

== Personnel ==
- Joshua Holland – vocals, guitars
- Noah Burns – drums
- Jeff Johnson – Bass
- Ross Robinson - production
- Mike Fraser – mixing
