= Start with a Strong and Persistent Desire =

Studio album by Vex Red
- Released: 4 March 2002
- Recorded: 2000–2001
- Studio: SW1 Studios (Cornwall); Standard Electrical Recorder (Venice, CA)
- Genre: Alternative rock
- Length: 50:54
- Label: I Am
- Producer: Ross Robinson

Singles from Start with a Strong and Persistent Desire
- 1. "Itch" Released: 2001; 2. "Can't Smile" Released: 18 February 2002

Start with a Strong and Persistent Desire is the debut album by English alternative rock band Vex Red. It was released on 4 March 2002 through I Am records. The album charted at number 48 on the UK Albums Chart and also spent two weeks on the chart. Two singles were released from the album. "Itch" was released in 2001, followed by "Can't Smile" in 2002 which reached number 45 in the UK Singles Chart.

The album was produced by nu metal producer Ross Robinson, who also signed the band to his Virgin Records imprint "I Am" in the early 2000s.

== Critical reception ==
Professional ratings
Aggregate scores
Source	Rating
Album of the Year	68/100
Review scores
Source	Rating
All Music	2.5/5 stars
Drowned in Sound	9.2/10 stars
The Guardian	3/5 stars
NME	7/10 stars
Ultimate Guitar	9/10 stars

Critical reception to the album was positive upon release. Drowned in Sound scored the album highly, reviewer Sajini Wijetilleka had particular praise for "Can't Smile", speaking of the track; "Sequenced-synth loops, emotional vocals and energised guitar swirls give us the excellent ‘Can’t Smile’, the best record that Gavin Rossdale wanted to, but could never ever make.". NME reviewer April Long gave the album positive write up stating; "The title says it all. Underpinning every spastic roar and raging riff on Vex Red‘s debut is the burning desire to make something enormous, resonant and real.". The Guardian gave the album 3/5 stars summarizing about the bands potential; " Vex Red take it a step further and become their own men. They might just evolve into greatness.".

== Track listing ==
All lyrics are written by Terry Abbott; all music is composed by Vex Red.

No.	Title	Length
1.	"The Closest"	4:48
2.	"Dermo"	3:33
3.	"Can't Smile"	4:49
4.	"Untitled"	5:18
5.	"Itch"	3:47
6.	"Bully Me"	4:53
7.	"Cause and Solution"	4:27
8.	"Start with a Strong and Persistent Desire"	3:52
9.	"Clone Jesus"	4:36
10.	"Sleep does Nothing for you"	3:55
11.	"Vert"	6:56
Total length:		50:54

== Personnel ==
Vex Red

- Terry Abbott – vocals, guitars
- Anthony Forbes – guitars, keyboards
- Nick Goulding – guitars, bass guitar
- Keith Lambert - bass guitar, keyboards, programming
- Ben Calvert – drums (credit only)

Additional musicians

- Ash Soan – drums
- Sonny Mayo – additional percussion
- Stefanie Fife – cello (6)
- Carrie Salmon – voice sample (7)

Technical personnel

- Ross Robinson – producer
- Mike Fraser – engineering, mixing
- Mike "Quiz" Terry – assistant engineer
- Baz Coz – engineer (5)

== Charts ==
Chart (2002)	Peak position
Scottish Albums (OCC)	61
UK Albums (OCC)	48
UK Rock & Metal Albums (OCC)	3

== Release history ==
Region	Date	Format	Label	Cat #	Ref.
UK	4 March 2002	CD	I Am	CDVUS 215, 7243 8 11798 2 6	
Japan	4 March 2002	CD	I Am	VJCP-68421, 7243 8 11798 2 6	
Europe	4 March 2002	LP	I Am	7243 8 11789 1	
