= Slipknot (album) =

Studio album by Slipknot
- Released: June 29, 1999
- Recorded: September 29 – November 11, 1998; February 1999
- Studio: Indigo Ranch (Malibu, California)
- Genres: Nu metal; alternative metal
- Length: 60:24 (58:03 on the reissue)
- Label: Roadrunner
- Producers: Ross Robinson; Slipknot

Slipknot chronology
Mate. Feed. Kill. Repeat. (1996)	Slipknot (1999)	Iowa (2001)

Singles from Slipknot
- 1. "Wait and Bleed" Released: July 28, 1999; 2. "Spit It Out" Released: September 19, 2000

Slipknot is the debut studio album by the American heavy metal band Slipknot. It was released on June 29, 1999, by Roadrunner Records, following a demo containing a few of the songs which had previously been released in 1998. Later, it was reissued in December 1999 with a slightly-altered track listing and mastering as the result of a lawsuit. It was the first release by the band to be produced by Ross Robinson, who sought to refine Slipknot's sound rather than alter the group's musical direction. This is the only album to feature original guitarist Josh Brainard who left at the end of recording in late 1998 while the band was taking a brief break. Jim Root, who recorded one track at this point, would appear full time on subsequent albums starting with their next album Iowa.

The album spans several genres, but is generally noted for its extensive percussion and overall heavy sound. It was well received by fans and critics alike and was responsible for bringing Slipknot a large increase in popularity. The album peaked at number 51 on the Billboard 200, and has gone on to become certified triple platinum in the United States by the RIAA, making it the band's best-selling album.

In 2011, it was voted the best debut album of the last 25 years by readers of Metal Hammer magazine. In 2018, readers of Revolver voted it as the second-greatest nu metal album of all time. In 2021, Eli Enis of Revolver included the song "(sic)" in his list of the "15 Greatest Album-Opening Songs in Metal". That same year, the staff of Revolver included the album in their list of the "20 Essential Nu-Metal Albums". In 2025, Rae Lemeshow-Barooshian of Loudwire included the album in her list of "the top 50 nu-metal albums of all time", ranking it seventh.

== Recording and production ==
In 1997, following the band's demo release, Mate. Feed. Kill. Repeat., the members of Slipknot continued to write new material and work in SR Audio, a local studio, with new vocalist Corey Taylor. The band began to work on a follow-up, but were never able to go further than pre-production. Songs written and recorded in this period include "Slipknot", "Gently", "Do Nothing/Bitchslap", "Tattered & Torn", "Heartache and a Pair of Scissors", "Me Inside", "Coleslaw", "Carve", "Windows", and "May 17". In 1998, Slipknot was receiving growing attention from record labels, including Epic and Hollywood Records.

On September 29, 1998, Slipknot left Des Moines, Iowa, and relocated at Indigo Ranch Studios in Malibu, California, anxious to record an album after a long wait to be signed. During that time, its members attended a show by avant-garde metal supergroup Fantômas, fronted by Mike Patton (whom the band already admired from his work with Mr. Bungle and Faith No More). Fantômas went on to greatly influence Slipknot's new music. After recording a new demo, Slipknot released it to prospective labels and producers; the track "Spit It Out" was the main focus in it and, with help from their manager Sophia John, they were able to supply a copy of the eponymous demo to Ross Robinson. The band wanted him to work with them on their debut album, and, after meeting with the band, Robinson signed them to his own label, I Am, but later helped sign them to Roadrunner Records.

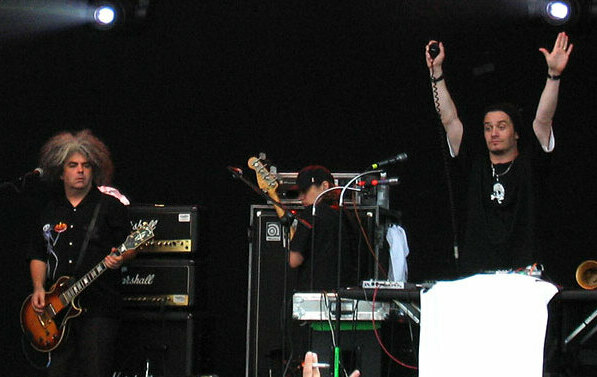
Avant-garde metal band Fantômas was a major influence on Slipknot.

The album's recording process was "very aggressive and chaotic", as producer Robinson strove to capture the intensity that the band created when performing live. Within three days all the drums were recorded, which contributed to the raw, live sound on the album that the band considered integral to its musical direction. Robinson played a big part in the stylistic change of the band, convincing them to cut off the more experimental sections and guitar solos in favor of a straightforward metal sound. By November 11, 1998, the recording of the album seemed complete and the band returned to Des Moines. During the Christmas period, guitarist Josh Brainard, who recorded on all the tracks to that point, left the band. The reasons for his departure were unclear; it was widely thought to have been because of family constraints. However, Brainard dispelled these rumours, explaining that "some decisions were made that I wasn't particularly happy with." His replacement was Jim Root, with whom the band returned to the studio in February 1999. Slipknot finished recording during this period, with one new track called "Purity". The mixing stages turned out to be very challenging, as drummer Joey Jordison and producer Robinson mixed the entire album with analog equipment, instead of the then more common method of using digital formats; according to Robb Flynn who just finished working on Machine Head's The Burning Red in the same studio at the time, Robinson and Jordison spent almost a month mixing "Purity" as the first song to serve as a template for the rest of the album.

"Wait and Bleed" and "Spit It Out", which also appeared on the demo prior to the album, were released on the album, also; the demo songs "Interloper" and "Despise" are available on the digipak version of the same album.

== Musical and lyrical themes ==
Slipknot's musical style is constantly contested; the genres in which the band are categorized vary depending on the source. However, this album is regarded as nu metal, alternative metal, and groove metal while showing influences of other genres. Joey Jordison stated, "The roots are death metal, thrash metal, speed metal, and I could go on and on about all those bands." The album also shows influences from rap metal. Critics have also noted an industrial influence.

The band's use of percussion, turntables, and samples gave the album a dense, layered sound. Alternative Press hailed the "inventive sampling, creative guitar work and an absolute percussive overload", while Q described the album as "a terrifying racket". Slipknot also includes melody, notably in the single "Wait and Bleed".

"742617000027", the intro, named after the barcode of Mate. Feed. Kill. Repeat., contains guitar scratches and abstract sound samples by sampler Craig Jones. The track features the line "The whole thing, I think it’s sick," sampled from an interview with a former cellmate of Manson Family member Susan Atkins in the 1973 documentary film Manson. In an interview shortly after the album was released, Jordison claimed the voice is Corey Taylor's, sped up. "(sic)", recalled Jordison, was written "at the very first rehearsal I had with Slipknot, on September 15, 1995. We were called The Pale Ones then and the song was originally called 'Slipknot'. It sounded completely different as Corey wasn't in the picture at that point." (Corey Taylor appeared on Slipknot's second demo, which resulted in them signing to Roadrunner Records.) "Paul [Gray, bassist] and I wrote the song together many years before we started Slipknot," said Shawn Crahan. "We basically had the riff and the drum beat. But it wasn't '(sic)' until everyone else was in the band and we brought it to [producer] Ross [Robinson]." "All of us were in the same room when we recorded this. It was hilarious. Everyone had their headphones tied to their head so we could all slam and go crazy while we played. Ross was throwing potted plants at Joey. It was the most insane thing I'd ever seen."

Out of all the tracks on the album, the song "Diluted" is the only one to have never been performed live. Rick Anderson of AllMusic noted that on "Scissors", Taylor "sounds like he's about to burst into tears." Taylor's aggressive, expletive-filled lyrics were noted by AllMusic: "[the] lyrics that are discernible are not generally quotable on a family website; suffice it to say that the members of Slipknot are not impressed with their fathers, their hometown or most anything else."

"Eeyore" – a hidden track at the end of "Scissors" – begins after dialogue shared among the band members, recorded while they were viewing a scene in a pornographic film that involved coprophilia. It has been played live many times and appears on the DVD Disasterpieces and the live album 9.0: Live.

== Critical reception ==
Professional ratings
Review scores
Source	Rating
AllMusic	4/5 stars
Alternative Press	4/5 stars
Chronicles of Chaos	8/10
Classic Rock	7/10
Collector's Guide to Heavy Metal	7/10
Kerrang!	5/5 stars
Q	4/5 stars
Rolling Stone	3/5 stars
The Rolling Stone Album Guide	2.5/5 stars
Sputnikmusic	4/5

Slipknot received acclaim by critics and fans; following its release the band gained popularity beyond their own expectations. Reviewing for AllMusic, Rick Anderson called it "an auspicious debut" and proclaimed, "You thought Limp Bizkit was hard? They're The Osmonds. These guys are something else entirely. And it's pretty impressive." The album's aggression and heavy sound was widely praised; Rolling Stone stated Slipknot is "metal with a capital m" and that they were "the first death metal jam band". Kerrang! called the album "raw and wholly uncompromising, each track delivered a powerful blow to the senses", and in 2001, Q included the album in their list "50 Heaviest Albums of All Time". CMJ ranked the album as the twelfth highest "Editorial Pick" for 1999. The album was also included in the book 1001 Albums You Must Hear Before You Die by Robert Dimery. Jon Hotten of Classic Rock described Slipknot's "scary, genre-busting debut" as a "clever synthesis of a slasher movie aesthetics with some grindingly heavy metal" and judged the band as apparently not "built to endure".

In 2011, Slipknot ranked at number 247 in Q's readers poll of the "250 Best Albums of the Last 25 Years". In 2021, it was named one of the 20 best metal albums of 1999 by Metal Hammer.

== Commercial performance ==
A single from the album, "Wait and Bleed", was nominated for Best Metal Performance at the 2001 Grammy Awards, but lost to Deftones' "Elite". The song was also named the 36th greatest metal song of all time by VH1. The release of the album and the touring which followed greatly increased the band's popularity. The album became the "biggest selling extreme metal album" at the time. It was ranked by American SoundScan as the fastest-selling metal debut in SoundScan's history. On May 2, 2000, the album was certified platinum by the Recording Industry Association of America (RIAA), a first for any album released by Roadrunner Records. On September 5, 2025, the album was certified triple platinum by the RIAA. In Canada, the album was certified 2× Platinum by Music Canada on May 21, 2021. The British Phonographic Industry certified the album as platinum on October 17, 2008, in the UK.

== Controversy ==
After the album's release, the band had to remove two tracks after allegations of copyright infringement. "Purity" and "Frail Limb Nursery" were inspired by a story, published online, about a girl named Purity Knight, who was kidnapped and buried alive. The website, called Crime Scene, presents fictional stories as real life crime cases. Originally, the website included no disclaimer saying that it was a work of fiction. Many readers believed the story to be true, including Corey Taylor: "I still think the story's real. It fucked our whole world up when we read it. Can you imagine a girl being buried in a box and have all this lecherous bullshit drip down on her from this guy? It just hurts your head."

'Purity', said Taylor, "was originally called 'Despise' but it didn't work when we tried to put it together… Ross [Robinson] took it and helped us restructure it."

However, Slipknot, to prevent the entire album being pulled, removed "Purity" and "Frail Limb Nursery". Standard and digipak versions of the album were issued in December 1999, replacing both tracks with "Me Inside". Although "Frail Limb Nursery" was never re-released, "Purity" was included on the DVD Disasterpieces, the live 9.0: Live, the 'best of' Antennas to Hell, and the 10th anniversary edition of Slipknot.

== 10th Anniversary edition ==
On September 9, 2009, Slipknot released a special edition version of the album to commemorate the tenth anniversary of its release. It was released in two forms, a digipak and a box set. The release date (09/09/09) is a reference to the fact that the band had nine members and had at that point sustained the same lineup since the original release of the album. The special edition box set includes: a CD and DVD set featuring all new digipak packaging, with a total of 25 songs including the original album with "Purity" (minus the prelude "Frail Limb Nursery") plus several previously unreleased cuts and demo tracks. The DVD, which was directed by percussionist Shawn Crahan, features footage of the band in 1999 and 2000, titled Of the Sic: Your Nightmares, Our Dreams. The DVD also features all three music videos released in support of the album, an entire live concert recorded at the Dynamo Open Air, 2000 and "other surprises". A "super deluxe" box set version of the re-release contains a T-shirt, patch, collectible cards, key chain, beanie and a note from vocalist Corey Taylor, and comes in packaging that resembles a safety deposit box.

== Track listing ==
All songs are credited to Slipknot (Shawn Crahan, Chris Fehn, Paul Gray, Craig Jones, Joey Jordison, Corey Taylor, Mick Thomson and Sid Wilson) in the original liner notes. Known songwriters listed where noted.

Original release
No.	Title	Lyrics	Music	Length
1.	"742617000027" (^{¡})	(Instrumental)	Jones	0:36
2.	"(sic)"	Taylor; Jordison	Gray; Crahan	3:20
3.	"Eyeless"	Taylor; Jordison	Thomson; Gray; Jordison	3:56
4.	"Wait and Bleed"	Taylor	Thomson; Josh Brainard; Jordison	2:27
5.	"Surfacing"	Taylor; Jordison	Gray; Jordison; Thomson	3:38
6.	"Spit It Out"	Taylor; Jordison; Gray	Gray; Jordison; Thomson; Crahan	2:39
7.	"Tattered & Torn"	Crahan	Crahan	2:54
8.	"Frail Limb Nursery" (^{†} ^{¡})	(Instrumental)		0:45
9.	"Purity" (^{†})	Taylor		4:14
10.	"Liberate"			3:06
11.	"Prosthetics"	Jordison; Taylor		4:58
12.	"No Life"	Taylor		2:47
13.	"Diluted"	Taylor	Gray; Jordison; Crahan; Jones	3:23
14.	"Only One"	Taylor; Gray; Jordison; Crahan	Gray; Jordison; Crahan	2:26
15.	"Scissors" ("Scissors" lasts 8:23; there is a period of silence between 8:23 and 13:21; there is an audio track entitled "Mudslide", which is of a conversation of the band, between 13:21 and 16:27 and a hidden track entitled "Eeyore" lasts 2:48.)	Jordison		19:15
Total length:				60:24

- ^†Both tracks are omitted completely from the reissue.
- ^¡Both sample interludes technically have no songwriters.

Digipak import bonus tracks
No.	Title	Lyrics	Music	Length
16.	"Me Inside"	Taylor; Jordison	Gray; Jordison; Crahan	2:39
17.	"Get This"	Taylor	Gray; Jordison; Crahan	2:02
18.	"Interloper (Demo)"	Taylor; Jordison	Gray; Jordison; Crahan	2:18
19.	"Despise (Demo)" ("Despise" ends at 3:41, followed by the hidden track "Eeyore")	Taylor	Gray; Jordison; Crahan	14:35
Total length:				81:58

December 1999 reissue and 25th anniversary edition
No.	Title	Length
1.	"742617000027"	0:36
2.	"(sic)"	3:19
3.	"Eyeless"	3:56
4.	"Wait and Bleed"	2:27
5.	"Surfacing"	3:38
6.	"Spit It Out"	2:39
7.	"Tattered & Torn"	2:54
8.	"Me Inside"	2:39
9.	"Liberate"	3:06
10.	"Prosthetics"	4:58
11.	"No Life"	2:47
12.	"Diluted"	3:23
13.	"Only One"	2:26
14.	"Scissors" ("Scissors" last 8:23; there is a period of silence between 8:23 and 13:21; there is an audio track entitled "Mudslide", which is of a conversation of the band, between 13:21 and 16:27 and a hidden track entitled "Eeyore" lasts 2:48.)	19:15
Total length:		58:03

- On the digital version, "Scissors" and "Eeyore" are separated tracks and "Mudslide" was removed.

European limited edition digipak import
No.	Title	Length
1.	"742617000027"	0:36
2.	"(sic)"	3:19
3.	"Eyeless"	3:56
4.	"Wait and Bleed"	2:27
5.	"Surfacing"	3:38
6.	"Spit It Out"	2:39
7.	"Tattered & Torn"	2:54
8.	"Me Inside"	2:39
9.	"Liberate"	3:06
10.	"Prosthetics"	4:58
11.	"No Life"	2:47
12.	"Diluted"	3:23
13.	"Only One"	2:26
14.	"Scissors"	8:23
15.	"Get This"	2:02
16.	"Interloper (Demo)"	2:18
17.	"Despise (Demo)" ("Despise" ends at 3:41, followed by the hidden track "Eeyore")	14:35
Total length:		66:06

Reissue digipak bonus tracks
No.	Title	Length
15.	"Get This"	2:03
16.	"Spit It Out (Hyper version)"	2:24
17.	"Wait and Bleed (Terry Date mix)"	2:31
18.	"Interloper (Demo)"	2:18
19.	"Despise (Demo)"	3:41
20.	"Surfacing (Live version)" (includes the track "Eeyore")	12:39
Total length:		70:47

10th Anniversary edition
No.	Title	Lyrics	Music	Length
1.	"742617000027" (^{¡})		Jones	0:35
2.	"(sic)"	Taylor; Jordison	Gray; Crahan	3:19
3.	"Eyeless"	Taylor; Jordison	Thompson; Gray; Jordison
4.	"Wait and Bleed"	Taylor	Thompson; Brainard; Jordison	2:27
5.	"Surfacing"	Taylor; Jordison	Gray; Jordison; Thomson	3:38
6.	"Spit It Out"	Taylor; Jordison; Gray	Gray; Jordison; Thomson; Crahan	2:39
7.	"Tattered & Torn"	Crahan	Crahan	2:53
8.	"Purity"	Taylor		4:25
9.	"Liberate"			3:06
10.	"Prosthetics"	Jordison; Taylor		4:58
11.	"No Life"	Taylor		2:47
12.	"Diluted"	Taylor	Gray; Jordison; Crahan; Jones	3:23
13.	"Only One"	Taylor; Gray; Jordison; Crahan	Gray; Jordison; Crahan	2:26
14.	"Scissors"	Jordison		8:23
15.	"Eeyore"	Taylor; Jordison	Gray; Jordison; Crahan	2:49
16.	"Me Inside" (replaces "Frail Limb Nursery" on reissue)	Taylor; Jordison	Gray; Jordison; Crahan	2:39
17.	"Get This"	Taylor	Gray; Jordison; Crahan	2:03
18.	"Spit It Out" (Hyper version)	Taylor; Jordison; Gray	Gray; Jordison; Thomson; Crahan	2:24
19.	"Spit It Out" (Stamp You Out mix)	Taylor; Jordison; Gray	Gray; Jordison; Thomson; Crahan	2:36
20.	"(sic)" (Molt-Injected mix)		Gray; Crahan	3:27
21.	"Wait and Bleed" (Terry Date mix)	Taylor	Jordison	2:31
22.	"Wait and Bleed" (Demo)	Taylor	Jordison	2:34
23.	"Snap" (Demo)	Taylor	Gray; Jordison; Crahan	2:41
24.	"Interloper" (Demo)	Taylor; Jordison	Gray; Jordison; Crahan	2:18
25.	"Despise" (Demo)	Taylor	Gray; Jordison; Crahan	3:41
Total length:				78:38

10th Anniversary edition DVD
No.	Title	Length
1.	"Of the Sic: Your Nightmares, Our Dreams (documentary film)"
2.	"Live at Dynamo Open Air 2000 (full concert)"

Music videos
No.	Title	Length
1.	"Spit It Out"	2:35
2.	"Wait and Bleed"
3.	"Surfacing"
4.	"Wait and Bleed (animated version)"

Vinyl release – side one
No.	Title	Length
1.	"742617000027"	0:36
2.	"(sic)"	3:19
3.	"Eyeless"	3:56
4.	"Wait and Bleed"	2:27
5.	"Surfacing"	3:38
6.	"Spit It Out"	2:39
7.	"Tattered & Torn"	2:53
8.	"Me Inside"	2:39
Total length:		22:07

Vinyl release – side two
No.	Title	Length
1.	"Liberate"	3:04
2.	"Prosthetics"	4:58
3.	"No Life"	2:47
4.	"Diluted"	3:23
5.	"Only One"	2:24
6.	"Scissors"	8:23
Total length:		24:59

25th anniversary edition bonus disc – Demos & Alternate Mixes
No.	Title	Length
1.	"Wait and Bleed" (Demo)
2.	"Snap" (Demo)
3.	"Interloper" (Demo)
4.	"Despise" (Demo)
5.	"Only One" (Demo)
6.	"Me Inside" (Demo)
7.	"Prosthetics" (Demo)
8.	"Surfacing" (Jay Baumgardner Mix)
9.	"Only One" (Jay Baumgardner Mix)
10.	"No Life" (Jay Baumgardner Mix)
11.	"(sic)" (Ulrich Wild Mix)
12.	"Purity"
13.	"Eeyore"

25th anniversary edition standard and blood splatter box set bonus LP – Demos and Alternate Mixes (side one): Demos
No.	Title	Length
1.	"Wait and Bleed" (Demo)
2.	"Snap" (Demo)
3.	"Interloper" (Demo)
4.	"Despise" (Demo)
5.	"Only One" (Demo)
6.	"Me Inside" (Demo)
7.	"Prosthetics" (Demo)

25th anniversary standard edition and blood splatter box set – Demos and Alternate Mixes (side two): Jay Baumgardner and Ulrich Wild Mixes
No.	Title	Length
1.	"Surfacing" (Jay Baumgardner Mix)
2.	"Only One" (Jay Baumgardner Mix)
3.	"No Life" (Jay Baumgardner Mix)
4.	"(sic)" (Ulrich Wild Mix)
5.	"Purity"
6.	"Eeyore"

25th Anniversary edition blood splatter box set – LP 2: Indigo Ranch Mixes (side one)
No.	Title	Length
1.	"(sic)"
2.	"Eyeless"
3.	"Surfacing"
4.	"Tattered & Torn"

25th Anniversary edition blood splatter box set – LP 2: Indigo Ranch Mixes (side two)
No.	Title	Length
1.	"Only One"
2.	"Liberate"
3.	"Suck These Nuts (Get This)"
4.	"Killing Leslie"

25th Anniversary edition blood splatter box set – LP 3: Indigo Ranch Mixes (side three)
No.	Title	Length
1.	"Me Inside"
2.	"Wait and Bleed"
3.	"No Life"
4.	"Interloper" (Diluted)

25th Anniversary edition blood splatter box set bonus LP – LP 3: Indigo Ranch Mixes (side four)
No.	Title	Length
1.	"Spit it Out"
2.	"Eeyore"
3.	"Scissors"

25th Anniversary edition blood splatter box set – LP 5: Live (side one)
No.	Title	Length
1.	"Wait and Bleed" (Live in Hartford 1999)
2.	"Surfacing" (Live in Hartford 1999)
3.	"Purity" (Live in Hartford 1999)
4.	"Spit it Out" (Live in Hartford 1999)
5.	"Eeyore" (Live in Hartford 1999)

25th Anniversary edition blood splatter box set – LP 5: Live (side two)
No.	Title	Length
1.	"(sic)" (Live in the UK 2000)
2.	"Eyeless" (Live in the UK 2000)
3.	"Purity" (Live in the UK 2000)
4.	"Spit it Out" (Live in the UK 2000)
5.	"Eeyore" (Live in the UK 2000)

25th Anniversary edition blood splatter box set – LP 6: Live II (side one)
No.	Title	Length
1.	"Purity" (Live in the UK 2000)
2.	"Prosthetics" (Live in the UK 2000)
3.	"Spit it Out" (Live in the UK 2000)
4.	"Wait and Bleed" (Live in the UK 2000)
5.	"Get This" (Live in the UK 2000)

25th Anniversary edition blood splatter box set – LP 6: Live II (side two)
No.	Title	Length
1.	"Surfacing" (Live in the UK 2000)
2.	"Me Inside" (Live in the UK 2000)
3.	"Scissors" (Live in Iowa 2000)

=== Samples ===
Source: Kerrang!

- "742617000027"
  - contains 'The Whole Thing I Think It's Sick' sample spoken by Corey Hurst for Manson movie.
- "(sic)"
  - contains 'Here Comes the Pain' sample spoken by Al Pacino for Carlito's Way movie.
- "Eyeless"
  - contains 'Ease Yourself Back Into Consciousness' sample spoken by Julie Khaner for Videodrome movie.
  - contains excerpts from "Amen, Brother" written by Richard Lewis Spencer and performed by The Winstons.
- "Surfacing"
  - contains excerpts from "Track 59" written and performed by Norman Cook.
- "Spit It Out"
  - contains excerpts from "Papa Lover (Dark Remix)" written and performed by General Degree.
- "Frail Limb Nursery"
  - contains excerpts from Purity Knight's recording from Crime Scene.
- "Prosthetics"
  - contains excerpts from "Scream for Daddy" written and performed by Ish Ledesma.
- "Diluted"
  - contains 'I Haven't Got Time for the Living' sample spoken by Rupert Everett for Cemetery Man movie.
- "Only One"
  - contains excerpts from "South of Heaven" written by Tom Araya and Jeff Hanneman; performed by Slayer.
- "Eeyore"
  - contains excerpts from "Man's Best Friend" written and performed by Ice Cube.
  - contains toilet noise, voiced by Jon St. John from Duke Nukem 3D game.

== Personnel ==
Personnel taken from Slipknot liner notes and Tidal, except where noted.

Aside from their real names, members of the band are referred to by numbers zero through eight.

Slipknot

- (#8) Corey Taylor – vocals
- (#7) Mick Thomson – guitar
- (#6) Shawn "Clown" Crahan – percussion, backing vocals
- (#5) Craig "133" Jones – samples, media
- (#4) James Root – guitar ("Purity", "Me Inside", "Spit It Out (Hyper Mix)" & "Spit It Out (Stamp You Out mix)")
- (#3) Chris Fehn – percussion, backing vocals
- (#2) Paul Gray – bass, backing vocals
- (#1) Joey Jordison – drums; mixing
- (#0) Sid Wilson – turntables; drum programming ("Eyeless")

Additional personnel

- (#4) Josh Brainard – guitar (except "Purity", "Me Inside", "Spit It Out (Hyper Mix)" & "Spit It Out (Stamp You Out mix)")
- (#3) Greg "Cuddles" Welts – percussion ("Spit It Out", 10th anniversary demo tracks)

Production

- Ross Robinson – production, mixing
- Slipknot – co–production; production on "Spit It Out"
- Chuck Johnson – mixing, engineer
- Sean McMahon – mixing on "Spit It Out"
- Rob Agnello – second engineer
- Steven Remote – location recording engineer
- Eddy Schreyer – mastering at Oasis Mastering, Studio City, California

Artwork

- Stefan Seskis – album cover, tray card photography
- Dean Karr – band photography
- T42Design – album design, lettering
- Lynda Kusnetz – creative director
- Slipknot – packing concept

== Charts ==
=== Weekly charts ===
Chart (1999–2000)	Peak position
Australian Albums (ARIA)	32
Austrian Albums (Ö3 Austria)	44
Canadian Albums (Billboard)	50
Dutch Albums (Album Top 100)	42
Finnish Albums (Suomen virallinen lista)	30
French Albums (SNEP)	175
German Albums (Offizielle Top 100)	57
New Zealand Albums (RMNZ)	49
Scottish Albums (OCC)	65
Swedish Albums (Sverigetopplistan)	53
UK Albums (OCC)	37
UK Rock & Metal Albums (OCC)	3
US Billboard 200	51
US Heatseekers Albums (Billboard)	1
US Independent Albums (Billboard)	1

Chart (2009)	Peak position
Japanese Albums (Oricon)	35

Chart (2019)	Peak position
Belgian Albums (Ultratop Flanders)	155

Chart (2021)	Peak position
Portuguese Albums (AFP)	10

Chart (2022)	Peak position
Belgian Albums (Ultratop Flanders)	106
Belgian Albums (Ultratop Wallonia)	45
Danish Albums (Hitlisten)	25
German Albums (Offizielle Top 100)	8
Hungarian Albums (MAHASZ)	14
UK Rock & Metal Albums (Official Charts)	1

Chart (2025)	Peak position
German Rock & Metal Albums (Offizielle Top 100)	3
Japanese Albums (Oricon)	48
Spanish Albums (PROMUSICAE)	60

=== Year-end charts ===
Chart (2000)	Position
Canadian Albums (Billboard)	123
US Billboard 200	98
US Independent Albums (Billboard)	4

== Certifications ==
Region	Certification	Certified units/sales
Australia (ARIA)	Platinum	70,000^{^}
Canada (Music Canada)	2× Platinum	200,000^{‡}
Italy (FIMI)	Gold	25,000^{‡}
Japan (RIAJ)	Gold	100,000^{^}
Netherlands (NVPI)	Gold	50,000^{^}
New Zealand (RMNZ)	Gold	7,500^{^}
Norway (IFPI Norway)	Gold	10,000^{‡}
Poland (ZPAV)	Gold	10,000^{‡}
United Kingdom (BPI)	Platinum	300,000^{^}
United States (RIAA)	3× Platinum	3,000,000^{‡}
^{^} Shipments figures based on certification alone.^{‡} Sales+streaming figures based on certification alone.

== Release history ==
Region	Date	Label	Format	Catalog
Worldwide release	June 29, 1999	Roadrunner	Compact disc	RR 8655-2
Worldwide release	June 29, 1999	Roadrunner	Digipak album	RR 8655-5
Worldwide reissue	December 1999	Roadrunner	Compact disc	RR 8655-8
Worldwide reissue	December 1999	Roadrunner	Digipak album	RR 8655-9
Japan	December 1999	Roadrunner	Digipak album	1686-185112
United States	December 1999	Roadrunner	LP	RR 8655-1
United States	December 1999	Roadrunner	Picture disc	RR 8655-6

== Sources ==
- Arnopp, Jason (2001). Slipknot: Inside the Sickness, Behind the Masks. Ebury. ISBN 0-09-187933-7.
- Crampton, Mark (2001). Barcode Killers: The Slipknot Story in Words and Pictures. Chrome Dreams. ISBN 1-84240-126-2.
