= Join, or Die (album) =

Compilation album by Amen
- Released: 2003
- Recorded: Various Studios
- Genre: Alternative metal Hardcore punk
- Length: 47:16
- Label: Refuse Music Records
- Producer: Casey Chaos, Ross Robinson

Amen chronology
We Have Come For Your Parents (2000)	''Join, or Die'' (2003)	Death Before Musick (2004)

Join, or Die is a 2003 compilation album by Amen. It was the first album published by the Refuse Music label and was limited to 2000 copies with the first 1000 copies hand numbered by Casey Chaos in his blood. The album features rare songs and b-sides, and was sold during the band's 2003 tour of the United Kingdom. In 2006, the album was re-released in 2006 with a run of an additional 2000 copies with, just like before, the first 1000 numbered by Casey Chaos in his blood.

== Track listing ==
All lyrics and instruments were by Casey Chaos.

No.	Title	Length
1.	"Buy American"	3:13
2.	"Cracks of Tomorrow"	2:59
3.	"The Bastard Sons"	2:42
4.	"Nobody's Friend"	1:32
5.	"Christian Criminal"	2:55
6.	"Disorderly Conduct"	1:34
7.	"Gun of a Preacher Man"	3:14
8.	"No Morals"	1:51
9.	"Resurrection Fixed Nothing"	3:39
10.	"Freedom Now"	1:11
11.	"Die Diva Die"	2:29
12.	"Destroy Rock'n'Roll"	1:57
13.	"Die to Begin"	3:12
14.	"Long Live the Plague"	1:59
15.	"Nice to Be Here"	3:27
16.	"Coma America" (Ministry re-mix)	2:47
17.	"propAMENda"	6:42
Total length:		47:16
