= Wild Throne =

American heavy metal band

Background information
- Origin: Bellingham, Washington, United States
- Genres: Hard rock, progressive metal, alternative metal, heavy metal
- Years active: 2008–2017
- Label: Roadrunner Records
- Past members: Joshua Holland; Noah Burns; Jeff Johnson

Wild Throne was an American heavy metal band from Bellingham, Washington, United States.

== History ==
The band formed in 2008 as a trio under the name Dog Shredder and were influenced by progressive rock bands such as Yes. In 2013, the band changed its name to Wild Throne. They signed a recording contract with Roadrunner Records and released their debut release Harvest of Darkness in 2015. The album received positive reviews from Metal Injection and Metal Sucks. The band toured with Red Fang, Royal Thunder and supported Kvelertak in 2016 on their North American tour.

On April 19, 2017, Wild Throne posted on its Facebook page that its members had amicably parted ways.

== Discography ==
- Harvest of Darkness (2015)

== Band members ==
- Joshua Holland - vocals, guitars
- Noah Burns - drums
- Jeff Johnson - Bass
