= Robert Piser =

American artist

Robert Piser (1952 - 2014) is an American artist who came to prominence in the 1970s transition from Pop Art to post-modernism.

Piser was born in Connecticut, grew up in Tarzana, in the San Fernando Valley suburbs of Los Angeles. Piser lived and worked in Berkeley, later returning to Los Angeles where he worked as an art director and scenic artist in film, commercials, music videos and photo shoots. Piser studied art and fine art lithography at Otis Art Institute, California College of Arts and Crafts, San Francisco Art Institute and U.C. Berkeley.

He is perhaps best known in the 1970s as the inventor of the idea of using newspaper vending machines to distribute art. He produced "The Daily Palette", for six years, during which time he printed and distributed silkscreen art prints he made of his and other local artists' paintings and drawings, via newspaper vending machines around the San Francisco Bay Area.

Piser worked in painting, drawing, sculpture, photography and fine art printing.
