= Amen (Amen album) =

Studio album by Amen
- Released: September 21, 1999
- Recorded: 1998–1999
- Studio: Indigo Ranch Studios (Malibu, California)
- Genres: Nu metal; alternative metal; hardcore punk
- Length: 42:44
- Labels: I Am; Roadrunner
- Producer: Ross Robinson

Amen chronology
Slave (1994)	Amen (1999)	We Have Come for Your Parents (2000)

Singles from Amen
- 1. "Coma America" Released: November 29, 1999

Amen is the second studio album by American rock band Amen and its first for a major label, released on September 21, 1999, by I Am/Roadrunner Records. The first track on the album, "Coma America", became the band's first single. In 2001, the album was re-released with four new bonus tracks.

Amen was recorded by Casey Chaos on vocals, Shannon Larkin on drums, Sonny Mayo and Paul Fig on guitar and John Fahnestock a.k.a. Tumor on bass guitar. The album was produced by Ross Robinson. It sold around 15,000 copies in its first year.

== Background and recording ==
After moving to Los Angeles in the early 1990s, vocalist Casey Chaos formed Amen in 1994. He produced and played all of the instruments on the band's first album, Slave (1994), which achieved little success upon release. After taking a liking to Casey's demos, Paul Fig joined Amen on guitar in 1994. In 1997, Chaos attempted to record another Amen album with producer Paul Raymond in Los Angeles. The album's recording sessions were marred by frequent partying and lineup instabilities—the latter, Chaos claimed, was due to him struggling to find other musicians in Los Angeles who weren't just interested in music for the money—and he would later describe them as both a "fiasco" and a "fucking nightmare".

Around this time, producer Ross Robinson became interested in working with Amen after listening to Slave. Robinson felt that Amen's lineup lacked focus, and after listening to it, convinced Chaos to abandon the in-progress album before signing the band on as the first act on his I Am Recordings imprint, whose releases were to be distributed by Roadrunner Records. "I played the album for [him] and he said, 'It's so good, I want to do this right'.", Chaos said. He noted that being signed to I Am gave Amen greater creative control than if they had been directly signed to Roadrunner. Robinson then introduced him to guitarist Sonny Mayo (of Snot) and drummer Shannon Larkin, who would both join the band in 1998. Bassist John "Tumour" Fahnestock, who had played with Mayo and Larkin in different bands in the past, joined Amen in 1999 after the dissolution of Snot following the death of its vocalist, Lynn Strait.

Amen was recorded at Indigo Ranch Studios in Malibu, California between mid-1998 and early 1999. According to Joel McIver, the album's recording sessions "have gone down in popular legend as one of the most demanding interactions between man and [recording] console ever". Chaos was infamously known to have been taken to hospital after slicing an artery in his hand and breaking his ribs whilst recording his vocals one day, and suffered black eyes due to the intensity of his singing. The album was recorded back-to-back with Vanilla Ice's Hard to Swallow, Machine Head's The Burning Red and Slipknot's self-titled debut album; Chaos would end up helping Robinson with Vanilla Ice's album and was forced to sleep in one of the studio's vocal booths for six months as a result.

== Releases ==
In 2001, the album was re-released by Roadrunner Records and included the four unreleased songs from the single of "Coma America". At this point, Amen had already switched to Virgin Records. The reissue was denounced by the band's frontman Casey Chaos, who released a statement, saying: "Don't buy our record. Just don't buy the fucking album. What I want to do is just press up 1000 CDs of the B-sides (from 'Coma America') and give them away at the shows for free or tell people to go to fucking Napster."

In 2007, Metal Mind Productions re-released the album in a new digipack edition on gold disc, digitally remastered using 24-Bit process, with a limited run of 2,000 hand-numbered copies.

== Reception ==
Professional ratings
Review scores
Source	Rating
AllMusic	3/5 stars
Collector's Guide to Heavy Metal	7/10
The Encyclopedia of Popular Music	3/5 stars
Kerrang!	4/5 stars
Metal Hammer	10/10 (1999); 10/10 (2001)
NME	7/10

Alternative Press included the album in their list of the best punk albums from 1999. Kerrang! placed Amen at number 22 on their list of "The 50 best albums from 1999" in a retrospective list from 2020. Metal Hammer featured the album on their list of "The 10 most underrated Roadrunner Records albums", calling it "Possibly the most intense album that Roadrunner released in the late '90s (yeah, even including Slipknot)". In 2016, Slipknot and Stone Sour frontman Corey Taylor named Amen as one of the "10 records that changed [his] life", saying:

"That album is so fucking good! I remember when it came out – I had just bought a CD player for my shitty car, we had three days off on the Slipknot tour and I finally got to drive my car. I got that piece of shit car way faster than it should have been able to go to the sound of that album."

== Track listing ==
All songs written by Casey Chaos.

No.	Title	Length
1.	"Coma America"	2:18
2.	"Down Human"	3:44
3.	"Drive"	3:08
4.	"No Cure for the Pure"	3:23
5.	"When a Man Dies a Woman"	3:30
6.	"Unclean"	2:50
7.	"I Don't Sleep""	2:25
8.	"TV Womb"	2:38
9.	"Private"	3:12
10.	"Everything Is Untrue"	4:19
11.	"The Last Time"	2:16
12.	"Fevered"	2:28
13.	"Broken Design"	2:23
14.	"Resignation/Naked & Violent"	4:09
Total length:		42:44

2001 bonus tracks
No.	Title	Length
15.	"Whores of Hollywood"	1:45
16.	"Lovers are Killers"	2:55
17.	"Life Crime"	1:23
18.	"Black God"	4:14

== Credits ==
=== Personnel ===
- Casey Chaos - vocals; cover, design concept, packaging concept
- Sonny Mayo - guitar
- Paul Fig - guitar
- Tumor (John Fahnestock) - bass guitar
- Shannon Larkin - drums

=== Production ===
- Ross Robinson - producer, A&R
- Chuck Johnson - engineer, mixing on "Coma America"
- Rob Agnello - engineer
- George Marino - mastering
- Steve Evetts - mixing (tracks: 3, 5 to 18)
- Joe Barresi - mixing (tracks 2 and 4)
