= Death Before Musick =

Studio album by Amen
- Released: April 5, 2004
- Recorded: 2002–2003
- Genre: Alternative metal; hardcore punk
- Length: 42:52
- Label: eatURmusic; Columbia
- Producer: Casey Chaos

Amen chronology
Join, Or Die (2003)	Death Before Musick (2004)	Pisstory, A Catalogue of Accidents/A Lifetime of Mistakes (2005)

Singles from Death Before Musick
- 1. "California's Bleeding" Released: April 3, 2004

Professional ratings
Review scores
Source	Rating
AllMusic	3/5 stars
Blabbermouth.net	4/10
Brave Words & Bloody Knuckles	7.5/10
Chronicles of Chaos	9/10
Drowned in Sound	7/10
The Encyclopedia of Popular Music	3/5 stars
Kerrang!	3/5 stars
MusicOMH	(positive)
Ox-Fanzine	7/10
Spin	B−

Death Before Musick is the fourth studio album by American rock band Amen. It was released in the United Kingdom on April 5, 2004, and in the United States on May 18, 2004, through eatURmusic and Columbia Records. The album continues the hardcore and punk genres of previous albums and draws on heavy metal as influence. Following this album, the band went on a lengthy hiatus. It was later revealed that despite Casey’s death in December 2024, this will not be the final Amen album, and that the follow up album will be released posthumously.

The album spawned the hit single and promotional video for "California's Bleeding." Drummer Luke Johnson, who joined the band around the time of the album's release and tour, appeared with the band in the photo shoot in the album's booklet but did not play on the album.

On April 19, 2010, Death Before Musick was reissued in the United Kingdom by IronBird Records. The reissue features four bonus tracks and a new interview with Casey Chaos.

== Track listing ==
All tracks by Casey Chaos.

No.	Title	Length
1.	"Liberation for..."	1:36
2.	"Hello (One Chord Lovers)"	3:06
3.	"California's Bleeding"	2:38
4.	"The Abolishment of Luxury"	2:33
5.	"Money Infection"	3:16
6.	"Westwood Fallout"	2:45
7.	"Oblivion Stereo"	3:00
8.	"Please Kill Me"	3:23
9.	"EXTERMINATE!"	3:06
10.	"We Got the Bait"	2:16
11.	"Neutron Liars"	2:38
12.	"Sorry, Not Sorry"	3:08
13.	"Bring Me the Heads"	2:46
14.	"Fuck in LA"	2:41
15.	"The Summer of Guns"	4:00
Total length:		42:52

Japanese edition
No.	Title	Length
16.	"Many Deaths Of..."	0:51
17.	"Bye USA"	3:04
18.	"Daycare Tourniquet"	3:31
19.	"Exit Masses Noose"	3:00

== Credits ==
Personnel

- Casey Chaos – vocals, guitars, bass
- Rich Jones – lead guitar
- Matt Montgomery – rhythm guitar
- Scott S. Sorry – bass
- Luke Johnson – drums (credited but did not perform)

Additional musicians

- Shannon Larkin – drums (uncredited)

Production

- Daron Malakian – executive production, A&R
- Matt Chidgey – mixing
- Mike Fraser – mixing
- George Marino – mastering
- Jon Pikus – A&R
- Freddy Sipowicz – assistant mixing
- Joe Barresi – mixing

== Charts ==
Chart (2004)	Peak position
Scottish Albums (OCC)	95
UK Albums (OCC)	105
