= The Henry Rollins Show =

- Created by: Henry Rollins
- Starring: Henry Rollins
- Country of origin: United States
- No. of seasons: 2
- No. of episodes: 41

Production
- Running time: 30 minutes

Original release
- Network: Syndication, IFC formerly on Fuse
- Release: April 1, 2006 – September 7, 2007

The Henry Rollins Show is a talk show hosted by musician Henry Rollins that aired weekly on IFC. The show featured Rollins' monologues, interviews with celebrities and uncensored musical performances. The show was canceled after the wrap of its second season.

== Sections ==
Each episode features an interview and a music segment. In addition, Rollins' monologues and other short segments are organized into several sections that are shown occasionally throughout the episodes.

=== Teeing Off ===
Rollins gives a short social commentary at the beginning of the show.

=== Letters from Henry ===
Rollins does a voice-over of humorous/sarcastic open letters he has written to celebrities and politicians.

=== Rollins Reconsiders ===
Rollins gives a sarcastically exaggerated "positive" speech, interspersed with humorous imagery (often photo manipulations), in which Rollins "reconsiders" a fad or issue he actually disapproves of.

=== The Disquisition ===
Comedian and political activist Janeane Garofalo shares her free-form musings in monologues filmed in her apartment.

=== Drawing Conclusions ===
Nine animated monologue segments were produced by Lylofilm for Swift River Productions and IFC during the show's two-year run. Rollins appeared as a stand-up comedian and his spoken word stories were animated with 2D visuals depicting his jokes and performance. The nine animated segments produced were titled: METHOD ACTING (with Danny DeVito); JUNK MAIL; WALL MART; CEDRIC; A TEXAS BARBECUE (with George W. Bush and Saddam Hussein); JESUS (with Jesus Christ); HIS GAY NEIGHBORS; TEEN ALCOHOLICA and NUTS ABOUT HENRY.

=== IFC Soapbox ===
Individuals from both sides of a debate (example topics from the show include pornography and same-sex marriage) are given a soapbox on which they can express their views.

=== End Credits ===
Rollins draws attention to lesser-known facts regarding historical figures and/or the work of actors and directors.

== DVD and iTunes release ==
Season one was released as a three disc DVD box set on June 5, 2007. Both seasons of the show are available for download from the iTunes Store as of February, 2010.

== Episodes ==
Season 1

Episode	Interview	Musical guest
01	Oliver Stone	Sleater-Kinney
02	Chuck D	Jurassic 5
03	Werner Herzog	Frank Black
04	Ozzy Osbourne	Ben Folds
05	Bill Maher	Black Rebel Motorcycle Club
06	Jeff Bridges	Ben Harper
07	Paul Thomas Anderson	Aimee Mann
08	Eddie Izzard	Death Cab for Cutie
09	Penelope Spheeris	John Doe
10	Patton Oswalt	Damian Marley
11	Perry Farrell	Deadboy & the Elephantmen
12	Adam Carolla	Dashboard Confessional
13	Michael Chiklis	Dinosaur Jr
14	Billy Bob Thornton	Daniel Johnston
15	Peaches	Ringside
16	John C. Reilly	Thom Yorke
17	Kevin Smith	New York Dolls
18	Johnny Knoxville	Slayer
19	Stephen Gaghan	Ani DiFranco
20	Matt Dillon	Rollins Band

Season 2

Episode	Interview	Musical Guest
01	Marilyn Manson	Peaches
02	Ben Stiller	Ryan Adams and The Cardinals
03	John Waters	The Mars Volta
04	Iggy Pop	The Stooges
05	Luke Wilson and Andrew Wilson	Chris Cornell
06	Joan Jett	The Blood Brothers
07	Steve Buscemi	Billy Bragg
08	William Shatner	Peeping Tom (Mike Patton)
09	Don Cheadle	Rufus Wainwright
10	Iraq War veterans	Bob Mould
11	Gene Simmons	Queens of the Stone Age
12	Tim Roth	Robyn Hitchcock
13	Larry Flynt	Placebo
14	Serj Tankian and Tom Morello	Amen
15	Christopher Walken	Shane Macgowan
16	Russell Simmons	The Good, the Bad & the Queen
17	Gore Vidal	Gogol Bordello
18	Samuel L. Jackson	Manu Chao
19	Shepard Fairey	The Duke Spirit
20	Arianna Huffington	Sinéad O'Connor
21	Steven Tyler	none
