= We Have Come for Your Parents =

Studio album by Amen
- Released: October 31, 2000
- Recorded: May 2000
- Studio: Sound City Studios, Los Angeles, California
- Genre: Nu metal; hardcore punk
- Length: 44:12
- Label: I Am; Virgin
- Producer: Ross Robinson

Amen chronology
Amen (1999)	We Have Come for Your Parents (2000)	Join, or Die (2003)

Singles from We Have Come for Your Parents
- 1. "The Price of Reality" Released: 2000; 2. "Too Hard to Be Free" Released: February 17, 2001; 3. "The Waiting 18" Released: July 21, 2001

We Have Come for Your Parents is the third studio album by American rock band Amen, released on October 31, 2000, through I Am Recordings and Virgin Records. The album was the band's second to be produced by Ross Robinson. The album was mixed and engineered by Mike Fraser at The Warehouse in Vancouver, BC. The title of the album refers to The Dead Boys album We Have Come for Your Children.

== Musical style ==
This album saw Amen continue the nu metal/hardcore punk blend that marked their entire career, as well as the political and socially-charged lyrics that were persistent in the band through the writings of Casey Chaos. Robinson himself has described We Have Come for Your Parents as "the most brutal record ever released on a major label".

== Promotion ==
A promotional audio cassette called PropAMENda was released in the United States in advance of the album by Virgin Records America in the Summer of 2000. The cassette contained two tracks: "Refuse Amen" and "PropAMENda (Excerpts From Forthcoming Album)", a 6-minute-long track featuring excerpts from the album.

The song, "The Price Of Reality", was released as an early single for the album, along with a promotional music video. The video itself depicted Casey Chaos re-creating Figure with Meat by Francis Bacon, along with various images of "Americana" such as Boy Scouts and girls in Sunday School outfits with axes. The video would later be released on the Streetwise DVD series in FYE in 2002.

Two more singles would be released after the album's release. "Too Hard to Be Free" would go on to reach Number 72 on the UK Official Chart on February 17, 2001, while "The Waiting 18" went on to be the highest ranking single, reaching Number 61 on the same chart on July 21, 2001.

== Release and reception ==
Professional ratings
Review scores
Source	Rating
AllMusic	3/5 stars
Blabbermouth.net	4/10
Drowned in Sound	10/10
Kerrang!	(2000) (2011)
Metal Hammer	10/10
NME	8/10
Q	4/5 stars
Rock Sound	5/5 stars
Terrorizer	9/10
Wall of Sound	69/100

We Have Come for Your Parents became Amen's most successful album, reaching Number 77 on the U.K. Charts on November 11, 2000, making it their breakout album in the United Kingdom. However, the album was largely unsuccessful in the US, where it did not chart and went on to sell 15,789 copies by 2002.

We Have Come for Your Parents received rave reviews from critics upon release. Drowned in Sound, Metal Hammer and Rock Sound all awarded the album perfect scores, with Metal Hammer's review noting the album was "something to give metal the clout round the beanie it so badly needs right now." In a four-star review, Kerrang!'s Mörat called it "a brilliant album—vicious, unrelenting and poisonous." Q magazine's Valerie Potter called it "far superior to their rather messy debut." Stuart Green of Exclaim! stated that the album "is about as brutal and honest a hard rock record as you're likely to hear this year." Likewise, Victoria Segal of NME noted its lack of "pantomime" and "self-parodic angst", giving it an 8 out of 10. CMJ New Music Monthly labelled it "punk in spirit [and] vaguely metal in execution", comparing its sound to early Rollins Band. They added, "even though Mr. Rap Metal produced We Have Come for your Parents, you won't hear any signs of the au courant rhyme and grind here."

Blabbermouth.net was one of few major media outlets which did not give the album a positive review, awarding it a 4 out of 10. Borivoj Krgin wrote: "Although Amen should be credited for pursuing a style that has little in common with their Southern Californian counterparts, the group's tuneless, noisy approach gets tiresome very quickly, with Casey's obnoxious, high-pitched screaming proving to be more irritating than effective, in the process adding a touch of abrasiveness to the songs that is bound to turn off many a discriminating listener. AllMusic's Tim Sheridan awarded the album three stars out of five, criticizing its "hackneyed lyrics" and finding its vocal delivery "oddly unaffecting".

Metal Hammer picked "The Price of Reality" as the best music video of 2000, and the second best single of the year. In 2002, "The Price of Reality" was ranked at number 62 on Kerrang!'s list of the "100 Greatest Singles of All Time".

Accolades for We Have Come for Your Parents
Publication	List	Year	Rank	Ref.
Kerrang!	Albums Of The Year 2000	2000	4	
Kerrang!	666 Albums You Must Hear Before You Die!	2011	N/A	
Kerrang!	The 50 Best Albums From 2000	2020	34	
Metal Hammer	Top 20 Albums of 2000	2000	2	
Metal Hammer	The Top 10 best albums produced by Ross Robinson	2016	8	
NME	NME Recordings Of 2000	2000	44	
Rock Sound	Critics’ Poll 2000	2000	2	
Rock Sound	The 250 Greatest Albums of Our Lifetime	2019	249	
Terrorizer	Albums Of The Year 2000	2000	22	

== Other editions ==
A limited edition copy came out in Australia during the Big Day Out 2002. It includes the CD We Have Come for Your Parents and another CD with unedited songs from all the singles as well as a multimedia track on with a clip of "Too Hard To Be Free".

A deluxe version of the album was released on January 5, 2013.

== Track listing ==
All songs written by Casey Chaos.

No.	Title	Length
1.	"CK Killer (Note: listed as "Calvin Klein's the Killer" in album liner notes)"	1:58
2.	"Refuse Amen"	2:45
3.	"Justified"	3:15
4.	"The Price of Reality"	3:17
5.	"Mayday"	3:03
6.	"Under the Robe"	3:55
7.	"Dead on the Bible"	3:05
8.	"Too Hard to Be Free"	2:44
9.	"Ungrateful Dead"	3:38
10.	"Piss Virus"	3:27
11.	"The Waiting 18"	3:17
12.	"Take My Head"	2:42
13.	"In Your Suit"	2:45
14.	"Here's the Poison"	4:09
Total length:		44:12

2013 Deluxe Edition Bonus Tracks
No.	Title	Length
15.	"Affording Heaven"	2:57
16.	"In These Pills..."	2:34
17.	"War in Your Name"	1:47
18.	"15+ Not Alive"	3:36
19.	"Room of Ruin"	3:23
20.	"Nice to Be Here (Live on BBC)"	3:19
21.	"Motorcade Horizon"	3:15
22.	"Another Planet"	3:55
23.	"Freedom Now!"	1:26
24.	"I Don't Bleed"	3:06
25.	"Murder Is Alright"	2:19
26.	"Europe [Killing Joke cover](Live on BBC)"	3:58
27.	"Justified (Live)"	3:26
Total length:		74:00

== Credits ==
Personnel per liner notes.

Amen

- Casey Chaos - Vocals
- Sonny Mayo - Guitar
- Paul Fig - Guitar
- John Fahnestock - Bass Guitar
- Shannon Larkin - Drums

Production

- Ross Robinson - production, mastering
- Mike Frasier - engineer, mixing
- Dean Karr - photography, layout

== Charts ==
Chart (2000)	Peak position
Scottish Albums (OCC)	68
UK Albums (OCC)	77
