= Gun of a Preacher Man =

Live album by Amen
- Released: August 2, 2005
- Recorded: February 2003
- Genre: Alternative metal, hardcore punk
- Length: 47:25
- Label: Snapper Records, Secret Records

Amen chronology
Pisstory, A Catalogue of Accidents/A Lifetime of Mistakes (2005)	Gun of a Preacher Man (2005)

Professional ratings
Review scores
Source	Rating
Allmusic	3/5 stars

Gun of a Preacher Man is a live album of Amen, released August 2, 2005 by Snapper / Secret Records. The album is a recording of a February 1, 2003 show in Manchester, England.

== Track list ==
All tracks recorded February 1, 2003 in Manchester.

No.	Title	Length
1.	"Coma America"	2:48
2.	"Refuse Amen"	2:56
3.	"Justified"	4:11
4.	"Piss Virus"	3:26
5.	"Buy American"	4:01
6.	"Whores of Hollywood"	1:36
7.	"D.R.I.V.E."	3:46
8.	"The Waiting 18"	3:51
9.	"Mayday"	3:40
10.	"Gun of a Preacherman"	3:33
11.	"CK Killer"	2:16
12.	"The Price of Reality"	4:20
13.	"Under the Robe"	4:01
14.	"Here's the Poison"	5:40
Total length:		47:25
