= Ghostemane =

American rapper and record producer (born 1991)

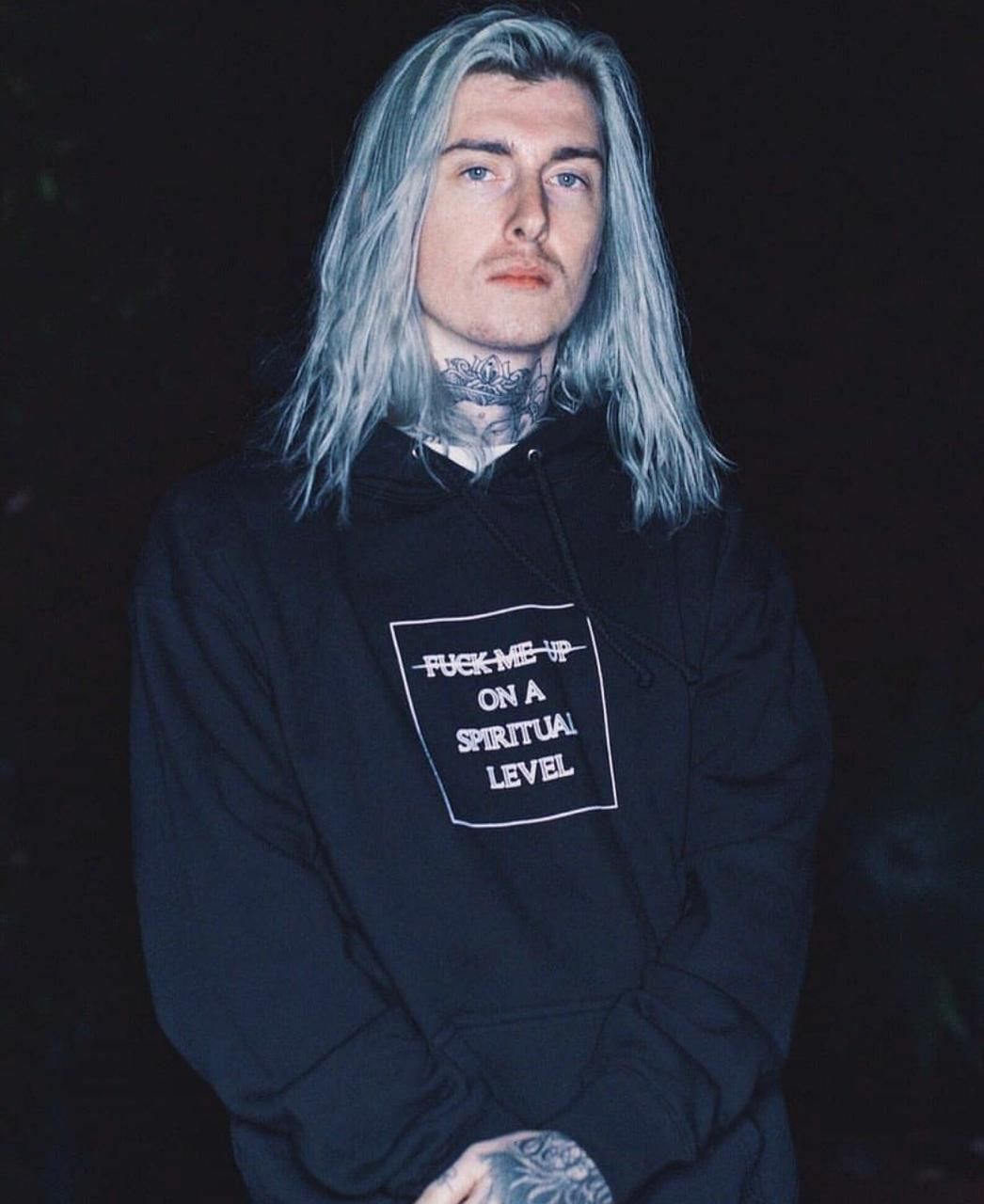
- Ghostemane in 2016

Background information
- Also known as: Eric Ghoste; Baader-Meinhof; Swearr; Ill Bizz; GASM
- Born: Eric Thomas John Whitney; April 15, 1991 (age 35); Lake Worth, Florida, U.S.
- Origin: West Palm Beach, Florida, U.S.
- Genres: Trap metal; hip-hop; hardcore punk; noise; alternative hip-hop; black metal; industrial hip-hop; doom metal
- Occupations: Rapper; singer; songwriter; musician; record producer
- Instruments: Vocals; guitar; drums; bass; synthesizers
- Years active: 2010–present
- Website: ghostemane.com

Eric Thomas John Whitney (born April 15, 1991), known professionally as Ghostemane (/ˈɡoʊstmeɪn/ GOHST-mayn) or Eric Ghoste, is an American rapper and record producer. He has released eight solo albums and three collaborative albums under his Ghostemane moniker, primarily merging elements of heavy metal, hip-hop and industrial music. Whitney has also released music with a number of additional solo projects, pursuing styles including black metal as Baader-Meinhof, noise music as GASM, and electronic music as Swearr. He began his career in local hardcore punk and doom metal bands around Florida. In 2015, he moved to Los Angeles, California, starting a career as a rapper, under the moniker Ill Bizz. Around this same time, he was a member of the hip-hop collective Schemaposse.

Ghostemane's merging of trap and metal gained him popularity on SoundCloud. In 2018, Ghostemane released his seventh studio album, N/O/I/S/E, which was highly anticipated in the underground music scene.

== Early life ==
Eric Thomas John Whitney was born on April 15, 1991, in Lake Worth, Florida to parents from New York. Whitney grew up in West Palm Beach, Florida. As a teenager, he was mainly interested in hardcore punk music. He learned to play the guitar and performed in several bands, including Nemesis and Seven Serpents. He also played football while he was in high school, saying he was practically forced to by his father, who died when Whitney was seventeen.

While playing guitar in the hardcore punk band Nemesis, Whitney was introduced to rap music and Memphis rap.

== Career ==
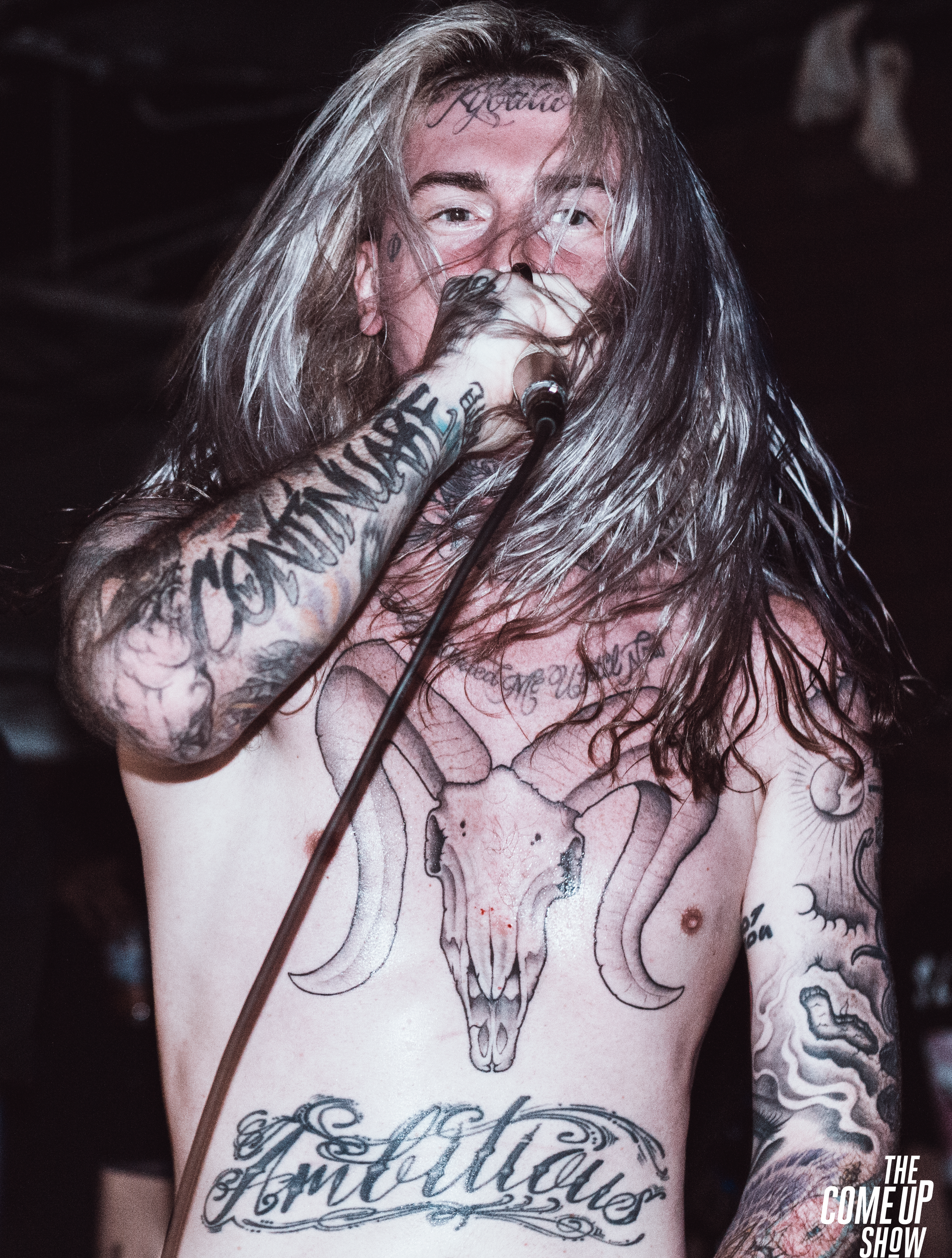
Ghostemane performing in 2017

Prior to his musical career, Whitney worked in several B2B sales positions. In 2015, due to not being able to musically thrive in South Florida, Whitney moved to Los Angeles, California. He also gave up his employment. Meeting up with JGRXXN, Whitney joined his collective Schemaposse, which included artists such as Craig Xen and Lil Peep.

In April 2016, after just 1 year with the group, Whitney left Schemaposse. He subsequently released his self-produced album "Blackmage" and his first cinematic music video with his single "John Dee". Whitney eventually began to associate with fellow Florida rapper Pouya, who released the video for "1000 Rounds" with Ghostemane in April 2017. The video quickly went viral, and as of September 2026, it had over 40 million views.

In late 2017, Whitney saw greater success when art collective TRASH GANG created and released their 1930s cartoon edit music video for his song "Mercury: Retrograde". The cartoon was a 1933 Betty Boop short, Snow-White, featuring Cab Calloway as Koko the Clown singing St. James Infirmary. The video has since climbed to over 600 million views, making it his most well known single.

In October 2018 he teamed up with Zubin to release a track titled Broken. Also in 2018, he released his seventh studio album, N/O/I/S/E, in which many of the songs are influenced by industrial metal, nu metal, Slipknot, Marilyn Manson and Nine Inch Nails. In May 2020, he unveiled his latest project, a lo-fi black metal band called Baader-Meinhof, of which he is the sole member (credited as Eric Ghoste).

In 2021, Ghostemane's music video "AI", directed by Nick Cinelli, was nominated for Most Bizarre at the Berlin Music Video Awards.

After a five-year hiatus from making new music, Whitney released a single titled "Zero Day" in August 2026, and announced that a new album will be released soon.

== Artistry ==
Lyrically, Ghostemane's themes focus on occultism, depression, nihilism, death and illuminism. He started his career as a musician playing guitar in hardcore punk bands, and drums in doom metal bands. He has stated that his biggest influence is extreme metal band Bathory. He spent most of his teenage years listening to extreme metal bands such as Deicide, Death, Carcass and Mayhem. In terms of rap music, Ghostemane is influenced by Southern rap groups such as Outkast and Three 6 Mafia. He has also gone on to cite Midwest rap group Bone Thugs-n-Harmony as an early influence.

== Backing band ==
Current

- Parv0 – DJ
- Nolan Nunes – bass
- Marcus Johnson – drums

Former

- Mark Bronzino – guitars
- Cayle Sain – drums

== Discography ==
=== As Ghostemane ===
==== Studio albums ====
- Oogabooga (2015)
- For the Aspiring Occultist (2015)
- Rituals (2016)
- Blackmage (2016)
- Plagues (2016)
- Hexada (2017)
- N/O/I/S/E (2018)
- ANTI-ICON (2020)
- AM:FM (2026)

==== Collaboration albums ====
- Pallbearers || Tales from the Grave (w/DJ Killa C) (2015)
- GRXXNGHOSTENAGROM (w/JGRXXN x Nedarb Nagrom) (2015)
- Elemental (w/Lil Peep x JGRXXN) (2016)
- LXRDMAGE (w/Scarlxrd) (2021)

==== Compilations ====
- Astral Kreepin (Resurrected Hitz) (2015)
- Get To Know Us (w/Lil Peep x JGRXXN) (2016)
- Hiadica (2019)

==== Extended plays ====
- Ghoste Tales (2015)
- Dogma (2015)
- Kreep [Klassics Out Tha Attic] Featuring Dj Insane (2015)
- DÆMON (w/Nedarb Nagrom) (2016)
- DÆMON II (w/Nedarb Nagrom) (2016)
- DÆMON III (w/Nedarb Nagrom) (2017)
- Dahlia I (w/Getter) (2018)
- Fear Network (2019)
- Opium (2019)
- HUMAN ERR0R (w/Parv0) (2019)
- Digital Demons (w/Nolife) (2019)
- Lxrdmage (w/ Scarlxrd) (2021)
- Fear Network II (2021)

==== Mixtapes ====
- Blunts n' Brass Monkey (2014)
- Taboo (2014)

==== Singles ====
- Technicolor (2014)
- Kronol (2015)
- John Dee (2016)
- Hades (2017)
- Kybalion (2017)
- Tartarus (2017)
- Kali Yuga (2017)
- Nails (2017)
- Blood Oceans (How Many?) (w/ PHARAOH) (2018)
- D(R)Ead (2018)
- AI (2020)
- Lazaretto (2020)
- Zero Day (2026)

=== As Ill Biz ===
==== Mixtapes ====
- Revival (ft. Shepherd) (2012) (on tracks "Revival" and "Lean Wit It" only)
- No Holds Barred (2012) (exclusive mixtape for datpiff.com)
- Versatyle (2013) (unreleased)
- [Soh] [fahy] mixtape (ft. Infinite SoFi) (2013) (on track "Southside" only)
- ILL BiZ EP (ft. Infinite SoFi) (2013)
- 1991 (2014)

=== As GASM ===
==== Studio albums ====
- Www (2018)

=== As SWEARR ===
==== Extended plays ====
- Technomancer (2019)

=== As Baader-Meinhof ===
==== Extended plays ====
- EP (2016)
- Evil Beneath a Veil of Justice (2019)
- Baader-Meinhof (2020)

=== With Nemesis ===
==== Extended plays ====
- From the Neighborhood (2012)

=== With Seven Serpents ===
==== Extended plays ====
- Seven Serpents (2015)

=== As Eric Ghoste ===
- Music from the Motion Picture (2021)
