= Emperor discography =

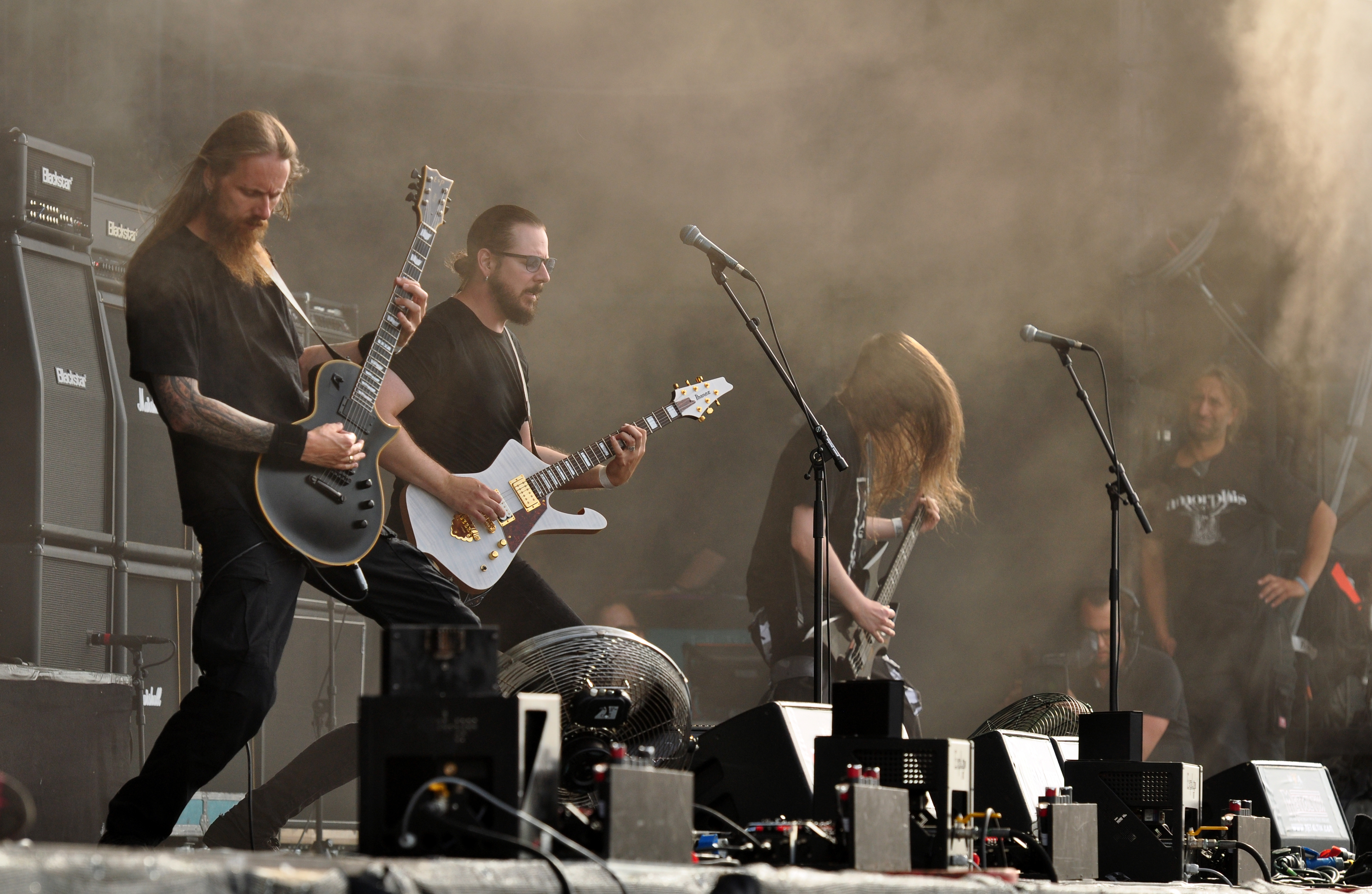
- Emperor in 2014
- Studio albums: 4
- Extended plays: 3
- Live albums: 1
- Compilation albums: 3
- Video albums: 1
- Demos: 1

This is a comprehensive discography of Emperor, a Norwegian black metal band. Emperor has released four studio albums, two live albums, six EPs, two DVDs and three compilation albums.

== Studio albums ==
Title	Album details	Peak chart positions	Sales
Title	Album details	FIN	Sales
In the Nightside Eclipse	Released: 21 February 1994; Label: Candlelight Records; Formats: CD, CS, LP, digital download	—	
Anthems to the Welkin at Dusk	Released: 8 July 1997; Label: Candlelight Records; Formats: CD, CS, LP, digital download	28	US: 18,260+
IX Equilibrium	Released: 27 April 1999; Label: Candlelight Records; Formats: CD, CS, LP, digital download	36	US: 10,820+
Prometheus: The Discipline of Fire & Demise	Released: 23 October 2001; Label: Candlelight Records; Formats: CD, CS, LP, digital download	—	
"—" denotes a release that did not chart.

== Live albums ==
Title	Album details	Peak chart positions
Title	Album details	SWE
Emperial Live Ceremony	Released: 6 June 2000; Label: Candlelight Records; Formats: CD, CS, LP, VHS, DVD	—
Live at Wacken Open Air 2006	Released: 21 April 2009; Label: Candlelight Records; Formats: DVD	—
Live Inferno	Released: 24 April 2009; Label: Candlelight Records; Formats: CD, CD+DVD, LP, digital download	13
"—" denotes a release that did not chart.

== Compilation albums ==
Title	Album details
Emperial Vinyl Presentation	Released: 20 May 2001; Label: Candlelight Records; Formats: LP
Scattered Ashes: A Decade of Emperial Wrath	Released: 25 May 2003; Label: Candlelight Records; Formats: CD
Emperor: The Complete Works	Released: 25 January 2017; Label: Blood Music; Formats: LP

== EPs ==
Title	Album details	Peak chart positions
Title	Album details	FIN
Wrath of the Tyrant	Released: July 1992; Label: Wild Rags Records; Formats: CD, CS, LP	—
Emperor	Released: 1993; Label: Candlelight Records; Formats: CD, CS, LP	—
As the Shadows Rise	Released: 1994; Label: Nocturnal Art Productions; Formats: CD, LP	—
Reverence	Released: 1996; Label: Candlelight Records; Formats: CD, LP	10
"—" denotes a release that did not chart.

== Other ==
Title	Album details	Notes
Call from the Grave	Released: 1992; Label: Self-released; Formats: CS	Demo tape.
Thus Spake the Nightspirit / Inno a Satana	Released: 16 February 2009; Label: Back On Black; Formats: 7" vinyl	Single, limited to 2000 copies.

== Split albums ==
Title	Album details	Notes
Hordanes Land	Released: 12 October 1993; Label: Candlelight Records; Formats: CD, CS	Split with Enslaved
Thorns vs. Emperor	Released: 1999; Label: Moonfog Productions; Formats: CD, CS, LP, digital download	Split with Thorns
True Kings of Norway	Released: 13 June 2000; Label: Spikefarm Records; Formats: CD	Split with Dimmu Borgir, Immortal, Ancient, and Arcturus

== Music videos ==
Title	Year	Album
"The Loss and Curse of Reverence"	1997	Anthems to the Welkin at Dusk
"Empty"	2001	Prometheus: The Discipline of Fire & Demise
