= Eremita =

Studio album by Ihsahn
- Released: 18 June 2012
- Studios: Ivory Shoulder Studios, Notodden, Norway
- Genres: Progressive metal; black metal
- Length: 52:35
- Labels: Mnemosyne; Candlelight
- Producer: Ihsahn

Ihsahn chronology
After (2010)	Eremita (2012)	Das Seelenbrechen (2013)

Professional ratings
Aggregate scores
Source	Rating
Metacritic	76/100
Review scores
Source	Rating
About.com	4.5/5 stars
AllMusic	4/5 stars
Blabbermouth.net	9/10
Chronicles of Chaos	8.5/10
Pitchfork	7.6/10
Sputnikmusic	3.5/5 stars
PopMatters	8/10

Eremita is the fourth studio album by Norwegian black metal musician Ihsahn. The album features guest appearances by several notable musicians, including Devin Townsend and Jeff Loomis of Nevermore.

The album is Ihsahn's first solo outing since the conclusion of the conceptual trilogy encompassing his first three albums, The Adversary, angL, and After.

== Background ==
Eremita featured a guest appearance by Devin Townsend. Previously, Ihsahn had guested on Townsend's album, Deconstruction. Jens Bogren, who mixed Deconstruction, was also tapped to mix Eremita. Ihsahn noted that

"Devin and I have very different personalities. I am much more of a quiet type, and Devin is a very energetic individual. I've met him on a few different occasions, and he's just a really awesome guy. In spite of our contrasting personalities and our musical expressions being very different, I can relate to and understand the way he works. I think it's because we share the same level of passion to create music, regardless of where it takes us. He also has his own studio where he does whatever it takes. If he has to bring in musicians or do it all himself...it doesn't matter. Like myself, his key focus is getting the music done. I admire his very honest expression through his music...he has no problem daring to be who he really is, and I truly respect that."

== Music and lyrics ==
According to Matt Mills of Metal Hammer, the album "screeched with discordant jazz before Ámr’s synths bubbled away." Ihsahn said that Eremita was the product of an intentional contrast with After. He described After as "a very desolate, bleak landscape. There were no signs of life in any of the lyrics," while, for Eremita, the atmosphere is "much more introverted, much more paranoid and kind of schizophrenic. I tend to bring up many of the same themes, but lyrically it comes from a different perspective." According to Mills: "Metal’s rarely as malleable as it is in this guy's [Ihsahn's] hands."

The title is Latin for "hermit", which Ihsahn identified as a critical term in his intellectual and musical development:

"Well, throughout my career I have turned to mythological figures, who went away from conformity and the collected to make up their own mind about stuff, to put it in a bit of a mundane way. It's more of a scenario and also very much an escape from conformity and the collected. Nietzsche has been a huge influence on me, in particular during the years that I've been doing my solo stuff. He was a hermit, he wrote about hermits and I guess I do this in a kind of hermit-like way myself. I am here in my hermit’s cave, a studio, doing my stuff alone. On different levels it just reflects aspects of the album itself and probably aspects of how I see things and how I work."

Continuing, Ihsahn elaborated on his connection to mythological hermits as follows:

"It's the symbolism of the hermit. I've associated myself with it for a long time. Not just because of the solo stuff, but because of the whole solitary figure who stands out in regular society and does things in a different way. Throughout my whole career I've come back to this image as a logical figure — whether it's Prometheus, or Icarus, or any of these solitary figures, you kind of represent those that break away from what is publicly accepted. It's about going away from everything else. For me, that's intellectually but also artistically just something that I find very natural and beautiful. It sums up all of the ideology I involve myself with."

== Artwork ==
The album's sense of introversion, paranoia, and schizophrenia is represented in the album cover, with which Ihsahn's ongoing interest in Nietzsche turned to Nietzsche's mad final years. Nietzsche is represented in the cover, which features an upside-down image of his face from later in his life, when he was on the verge of insanity. As Ihsahn explained, Eremita is "a reflective album that's filtered through the eyes of a madman." He elaborated upon the connection, explaining that "There's an escapism to this album, there's a paranoia, a lot of issues that are dealt with, and these pictures of Nietzsche are from very close to when he tipped over into madness."

== Track listing ==
No.	Title	Length
1.	"Arrival"	5:40
2.	"The Paranoid"	4:43
3.	"Introspection"	5:37
4.	"The Eagle and the Snake"	8:47
5.	"Catharsis"	4:50
6.	"Something Out There"	5:09
7.	"Grief"	2:21
8.	"The Grave"	8:18
9.	"Departure"	7:06
Total length:		52:35

Deluxe edition bonus track
No.	Title	Length
10.	"Recollection"	5:39

== Personnel ==
- Ihsahn – vocals, guitar, bass, keyboards, production

Additional musicians

- Tobias Ørnes Andersen – drums
- Jørgen Munkeby – saxophone
- Jeff Loomis – guest guitar solo on "The Eagle and the Snake"
- Devin Townsend – guest vocals on "Introspection"
- Einar Solberg (Leprous) – guest vocals on "Arrival"
- Heidi S. Tveitan – guest vocals on "Departure"

Additional personnel

- Jens Bogren – mixing at Fascination Street Studios in Örebro, Sweden
- Ritxi Ostáriz – album artwork and packaging
