= Wrath of the Tyrant =

Demo album by Emperor
- Released: 11 July 1992
- Recorded: 8–11 May 1992
- Genre: Black metal
- Length: 32:12
- Label: Wild Rag
- Producer: Emperor

Emperor chronology
Wrath of the Tyrant (1992)	Emperor (1993)

Alternate cover
- Century Black version

Professional ratings
Review scores
Source	Rating
AllMusic	3/5 stars

Wrath of the Tyrant is the first demo album by Norwegian black metal band Emperor. It was recorded in May 1992 and self-released by the band shortly after.

== Releases ==
Wrath of the Tyrant was originally distributed by the band as a demo shortly after it was recorded. This original demotape had a picture of a chimera on the cover. In 1994 it was re-released through Wild Rag Records with two bonus tracks and different artwork. Tchort, who didn't join the band until 1993, is the person who appears on this cover. A limited edition 12" vinyl was released by Head not Found records in 1995; this version featured a photograph of the Scott Monument in Edinburgh as new cover art. In 1998, it was re-mastered and released with the tracks from the Emperor EP. There are two versions of this re-release; the Candlelight Records version has the cover of the Emperor EP and features video footage of live performances from the band, while the Century Black version has a different cover and lacks the video footage.

Most of the songs on Wrath of the Tyrant were later re-recorded by the band. "Wrath of the Tyrant" and "Night of the Graveless Souls" were re-recorded in December 1992 for the Emperor EP. "Ancient Queen", "Witches Sabbath" and "Lord of the Storms" were re-recorded during the same session and released on As the Shadows Rise. "My Empire's Doom" was re-recorded and renamed "Beyond the Great Vast Forest" on the band's debut album, In the Nightside Eclipse. "Moon over Kara-Shehr" was re-recorded with Jan Axel "Hellhammer" Blomberg on drums and released on the compilation Nordic Metal - A Tribute to Euronymous in 1995.

== Track listing ==
All lyrics are written by Mortiis; all music is composed by Samot and Ygg.

No.	Title	Length
1.	"Introduction"	2:20
2.	"Ancient Queen"	3:17
3.	"My Empire's Doom"	4:34
4.	"Forgotten Centuries"	2:51
5.	"Night of the Graveless Souls"	2:56
6.	"Moon over Kara-Shehr"	4:25
7.	"Witches Sabbath"	5:41
8.	"Lord of the Storms"	2:10
9.	"Wrath of the Tyrant"	3:58
Total length:		32:12

== 1998 edition ==
Emperor
No.	Title	Length
1.	"I am the Black Wizards"	6:16
2.	"Wrath of the Tyrant"	4:14
3.	"Night of the Graveless Souls"	3:10
4.	"Cosmic Keys to My Creations & Times"	6:20

Wrath of the Tyrant
No.	Title	Length
5.	"Introduction"	2:20
6.	"Ancient Queen"	3:17
7.	"My Empire's Doom"	4:34
8.	"Forgotten Centuries"	2:51
9.	"Night of the Graveless Souls"	2:56
10.	"Moon over Kara-Shehr"	4:25
11.	"Witches Sabbath"	5:41
12.	"Lord of the Storms"	2:10
13.	"Wrath of the Tyrant"	3:58

== Personnel ==
Emperor

- Ygg – guitar, vocals, keyboards
- Samot – drums, guitar, vocals on "Witches Sabbath"
- Mortiis – bass guitar

Additional personnel

- Christophe Szpajdel – logo
