= Mnemosyne Productions =

Norwegian record label

Mnemosyne Productions was established in Notodden, Norway 2003 by founders Heidi S. Tveitan/Starofash and Vegard Tveitan/Ihsahn as an extension to their work in the music industry. This label is mainly an outlet for their own musical collaborations. The founders have more than 10 years of experience as recording artists (Emperor, Ihsahn, Peccatum, Starofash and TSS), and have recorded and produced most of their recent work at their creative playground. At present, they are also working with selected tasks in film and web scoring.

== Releases on Mnemosyne Productions ==
- Mnemo001 - Peccatum - Lost in Reverie (2004)
- Mnemo002 - Peccatum - The Moribund People (2005)
- Mnemo004 - Ihsahn - The Adversary (2006)
- Mnemo005 - Hardingrock - Grimen (2007)
- Mnemo006 - Starofash - The Thread (2008)
- Mnemo007 - Ihsahn - angL (2008)
- Mnemo009 - Starofash - Ulterior Soundtrack (2009)
- Mnemo010 - Ihsahn - After (2010)
- mnemo011 - Starofash - Lakhesis (2010)
- mnemo012 - Ihsahn - Eremita (2012)
- mnemo013 - Ihsahn - Das Seelenbrechen (2013)

== See also ==
- List of record labels
