= Iter.Viator =

Studio album by Star of Ash
- Released: 2002
- Recorded: 2001–2002
- Genre: Avant-garde; Neo-classical
- Length: 42:32
- Label: Jester Records
- Producer: Heidi S. Tveitan; V. Tveitan; Tore Ylwizaker; Kris G. Rygg

Professional ratings
Review scores
Source	Rating
Allmusic	link
Decoy music	link

Iter.Viator is the debut solo album of ex-Peccatum member, (and wife of Ihsahn) Ihriel. Translated from Latin "Iter Viator" literally means "road traveler".

== Track listing ==
- All Songs Written & Arranged By Ihriel.
1. "Chasm Blue" – 1:44
2. "Sanies" – 7:03
3. "Beautiful As Torment" – 6:38
4. "Death Salutes Atropos" – 5:27
5. "The Nudity Of Light" – 3:26
6. "Odi Et Amo" – 7:14
7. "In The Throws Of Guilt" – 11:00

== Personnel ==
=== Star of Ash ===
- Heidi S. Tveitan: Vocals, Keyboards, programming

=== Additional Personnel ===
- Vegard Sverre Tveitan: Guitar on all songs except "Sanies", bass on tracks 3–7, vocals on 4 & 7.
- Einar Solberg: Vocals on track 3.
- Jostein Thomassen: Guitar on track 3 & 6.
- Knut Aalefjær: Drums & percussion on tracks 3–6.
- Kenneth Lia Solberg: Guitar on tracks 4 & 6.
- Kris G. Rygg: Vocals on tracks 5 & 7.
- The Star Of Ash Choir on track 7: Kaia Lia (conductor), Sanne Anundskås, Astrid Marie Lia, Inger Bronken, Elisabeth Lia, Marit Bøe, Heidi S. Tveitan, Pål Solberg, Knut Bendik Breistein, Einar Solberg, Vegard Tveitan, Kenneth Lia Solberg

== Production ==
- Produced By Heidi S. Tveitan, V. Tveitan, Tore Ylwizaker & Kris G. Rygg
- Recorded, Engineered & Mixed By Kristoffer G. Rygg, Tore Ylwizaker & Ihriel
- Mastered By Tom Kvalsvoll
