= Das Seelenbrechen =

Studio album by Ihsahn
- Released: 21 October 2013
- Studio: Mnemosyne Studio
- Genre: Progressive metal; black metal; avant-garde metal
- Length: 48:58
- Label: Mnemosyne; Candlelight
- Producer: Ihsahn

Ihsahn chronology
Eremita (2012)	Das Seelenbrechen (2013)	Arktis (2016)

Das Seelenbrechen is the fifth studio album by Norwegian black metal musician Ihsahn. Released on 21 October 2013, the album was described by Ihsahn as a "deliberate sidestep" that used improvisation as the basis for his most diverse recording to date, which Decibel described as "surprising and strangely satisfying".

== Background ==
Ihsahn described Das Seelenbrechen as a "deliberate sidestep" from his previous solo albums, which was designed "to avoid falling into any kind of formula". He suggested that the album was influenced by the musical experimentation of Diamanda Galas and Scott Walker, for whom he admitted "I've always admired musicians that dive into it like that and express something right there and then without filter, or polishing it too much".

Describing the album as intentionally "out of his comfort zone", it relied upon improvisation to create a "more spontaneous and intuitive" feeling. The result of this spontaneity was that he felt that he could express himself without his "own ego" or "critical goblin" haunting his creativity. This also enabled him to dispose of his predilection for "masking" the personal subject matter of his lyrics with "grandiose images". Ihsahn speculated that

I think as I wrote more spontaneously it came from a more personal state of mind. Some one who is smarter than me said "All art is created from a place between megalomania and self loathing." It's a roller coaster between the two and it hasn't gotten any easier.

Suggesting that he was "deliberate about this [album] not being...easily accessible", Ihsahn contrasted Das Seelenbrechen with his previous albums, for which he "sometimes...got caught up in the technicalities of things", whereas, on Das Seelenbrechen, he consciously let go of that level of control:

this time I had to remind myself what it's all about, the energy and the atmosphere you want to express. In the controlled way of doing albums, it leaves very little room for those kind of magic accidents to happen. So for this new album, I just wanted to sacrifice all of the control and the "filter" in the hope that a more open-ended approach would leave more room for possibilities of magical things to happen.

This resulted in a more diverse album than Ihsahn's previous solo recordings. For Ihsahn, this improvisation enabled him to "break the pattern of the typical metal albums that have one set of basic arrangements for the whole album...I wanted each song to grow out of itself and just become the instrument and arrangement that I felt each song needed, regardless of how it would all fit together, just trying to trust that the overhanging general vibe would still be present". Ihsahn admitted that, after hearing the album in post-production, he thought that it was "totally a commercial suicide", although he remarked that the album's favorable reception left him "positively surprised".

While the album has been cited for its progressive and avant garde tendencies, Ihsahn maintained that the album linked back to his black metal roots in terms of atmosphere, stating that:

with this album the general idea was to actually go backwards and make an album with a very pure, old-school, dark black metal atmosphere that sends a very different message, with some different song structures. The underlying atmosphere was to have that black metal feel. It's a very dark album all the way through. But at the same time, I wanted to break the pattern of the typical metal albums that have one set of basic arrangements for the whole album, one production for the entire thing, which has always been very typical for a metal album.

The album title, which is German for "breaking souls", was taken from aphorism 152 of Friedrich Nietzsche's Human, All Too Human that discusses the "art of the ugly soul". Ihsahn said of the word "das Seelenbrechen",

That word is not a real German word, he [Nietzsche] put it together and I felt it summed up the feeling that comes from my inspiration. Perception synonymous with abstract, I crave it when I listen to music. To reach the place beyond perception where you lose yourself. That is where those happy mistakes come from, the ego is aside and it's nothing technical.

== Critical reception ==
Professional ratings
Review scores
Source	Rating
About.com	4/5 stars
Blabbermouth.net	8.5/10
Decibel	7/10
Exclaim!	8/10
MetalSucks	3.5/5 stars
What Culture	4.5/5 stars

Das Seelenbrechen has received generally positive critical reviews. Adrien Begrand praised Ihsahn in Decibel for demonstrating restraint in his experimentation, which "keeps this surprising and strangely satisfying record on an even keel". Chad Bowar, writing for About.com, observed that "Das Seelenbrechen is not a comfortable album. It's challenging, sometimes puzzling, but ultimately rewarding". In Exclaim!, Natalie Zina Walschots observed that the album "plunges into much deeper, stranger waters than the artist has explored previously". Claiming that Das Seelenbrechen serves as the aural equivalent of a Max Ernst piece, Ray van Horn Jr. suggested in his Blabbermouth.net review that the album "finds a lot more emphasis placed upon experimentalism and even softer techniques with drum machines, synths, coldwave, prog and jive, plus accessible harmonies and brief spoken word added to Ihsahn's staggering terror zones". MetalSucks was more critical, noting inconsistency as "the album dissolves into confused, disorganized experimentation by its conclusion, finishing without much resolution at all". However, other critics have seen this as a virtue, with Harjot Rahi of What Culture suggesting that the lack of cohesion, despite being "disruptive for the listener...actually helps to foster the overall uncomfortable atmosphere that Ihsahn had intended to create".

== Track listing ==
All tracks are written by Ihsahn

No.	Title	Length
1.	"Hiber"	5:12
2.	"Regen"	5:03
3.	"NaCl"	4:24
4.	"Pulse"	4:53
5.	"Tacit II"	4:58
6.	"Tacit I"	4:36
7.	"Rec"	2:26
8.	"M"	4:39
9.	"Sub Äter"	5:15
10.	"See"	7:29
Total length:		48:58

Bonus tracks
No.	Title	Length
11.	"Entropie"	4:45
12.	"Hel"	2:49

== Personnel ==
- Ihsahn – all instruments, vocals, recording, production

Additional musicians

- Tobias Ørnes Andersen – drums
- Heidi S. Tveitan – choir, photography

Additional personnel

- Jens Bogren – mixing
- Ritxi Ostariz – design
