= Thou Shalt Suffer =

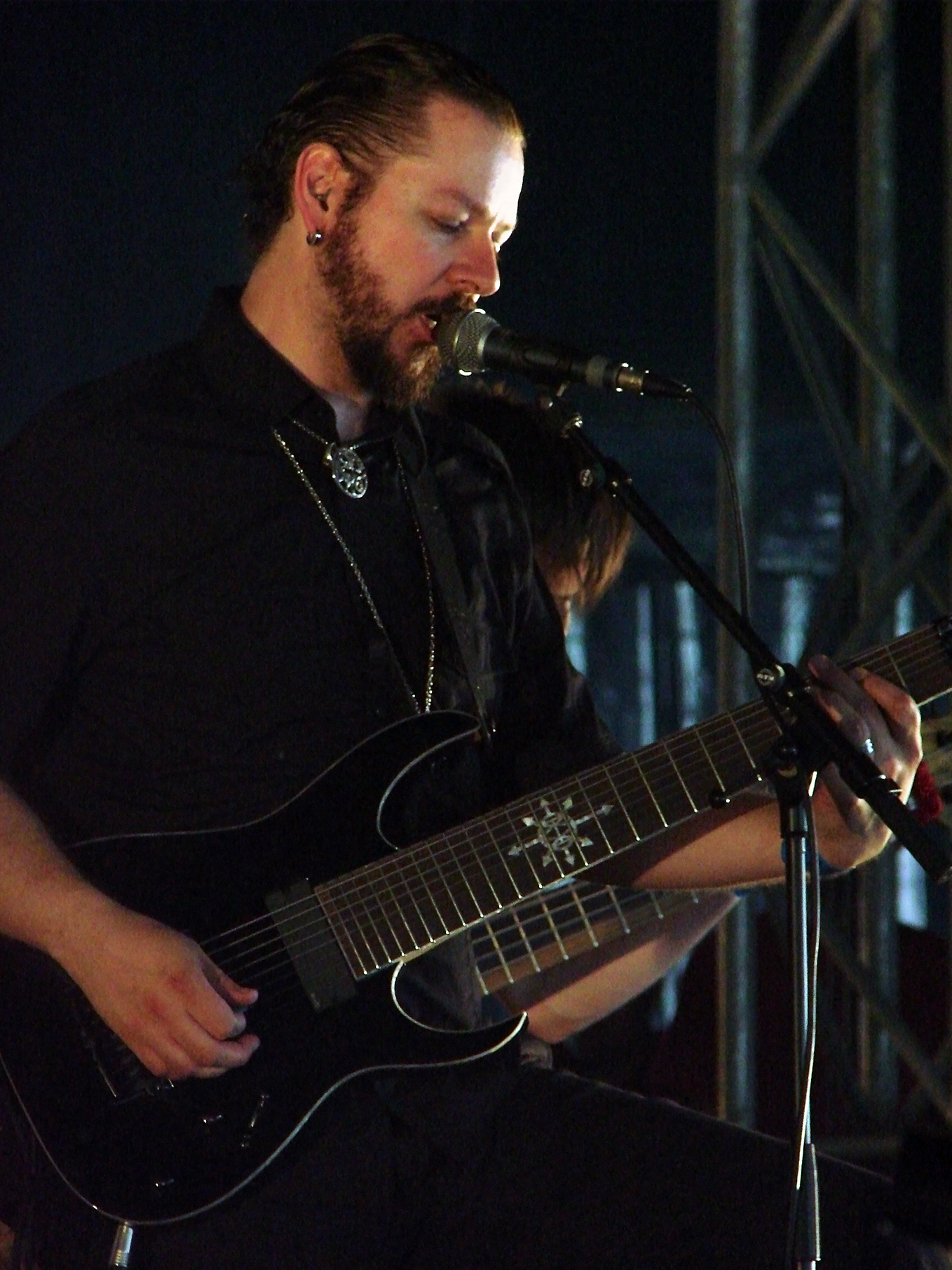

Background information
- Origin: Notodden, Telemark, Norway
- Genres: Neoclassical dark wave; contemporary classical; death metal (early)
- Years active: 1990–1991, 2000
- Labels: Distorted Harmony, Nocturnal Art, Candlelight

Thou Shalt Suffer were a band that formed in 1990 at Akkerhaugen, Norway, under the name "Dark Device". Its style was mainly death metal, though it included some black metal traits, alongside Ihsahn's trademark keyboard melodies. The band split up in late 1991 when its members formed Emperor and Ildjarn.

In 2000, Ihsahn used the name Thou Shalt Suffer for his solo project. That year he released Somnium, an album of neoclassical dark wave influenced by medieval music.

== History ==
Thou Shalt Suffer began in 1990 when vocalist Ihsahn met guitarist Samoth at a clinic for rock musicians. The two started playing together under various names, such as Dark Device, Xerasia, and Embryonic. They eventually settled on Thou Shalt Suffer. It was during this time Ihsahn began to develop his skills as a keyboard player, and his trademark sound can be heard on the band's recordings. In 1991, the band recorded two demos, Into the Woods of Belial and Open the Mysteries of Your Creation. Both recordings exhibited a distinct style which eventually developed into the classic "Emperor sound" of Ihsahn's and Samoth's later careers. Most of the band's early material was recorded on Ildjarn's 4-track recording device (which he later used to record his solo albums) and featured very raw and dirty production.

When Samoth began writing music outside of the band, Thou Shalt Suffer began to dissolve. Bassist Ildjarn and drummer Thorbjørn Akkerhaugen both left the band. Ildjarn formed his own eponymous project Ildjarn (which was often contributed to by both Ihsahn and Samoth), while Akkerhaugen went on to found Akkerhaugen Studios. At this point (late 1991), Emperor had come into full swing, and Thou Shalt Suffer was put on hold. Ihsahn did not completely abandon the band, however – instead, he used the name to release neoclassical dark wave. The first Thou Shalt Suffer full-length album was released in 2000, titled Somnium. It was composed and produced entirely by Ihsahn. The band's original two demos were pressed to CD and released to the public. This compilation, simply titled Into the Woods of Belial, was re-released and widely distributed in 2004.

For the time being, Thou Shalt Suffer seems to be on hold once again, as Ihsahn is focusing primarily on his solo career because his previous project, Peccatum, has been terminated.

== Discography ==
- Rehearsals '90 (1990) (as Xerasia)
- The Land of the Lost Souls (1990) (as Embryonic)
- 4-track Rehearsal (1991)
- Open the Mysteries of Your Creation (1991)
- Into the Woods of Belial (Demo) (1991)
- Into the Woods of Belial (Compilation) (1997 / 2004)
- Somnium (2000)

== Band members ==
=== Final line-up ===
- Ihsahn - vocals, guitar, keyboard (1990–1991, 2000)

=== Former members ===
- Samoth - guitar (1990–1991), bass (1991), drums (1991)
- Ildjarn (Vidar Vaaer) - bass (1991)
- Thorbjørn Akkerhaugen - drums (1991)

== Related bands ==
- Emperor - The black metal band which Thou Shalt Suffer eventually evolved into (with members Ihsahn and Samoth).
- Ildjarn - The eponymous band of former Thou Shalt Suffer bassist Vidar Vaaer, known musically as Ildjarn.
