= Emperor (EP) =

EP by Emperor
- Released: May 1993
- Recorded: December 1992
- Genre: Black metal
- Length: 20:00
- Label: Candlelight
- Producer: Emperor

Emperor chronology
Wrath of the Tyrant (1992)	Emperor (1993)	In the Nightside Eclipse (1994)

Professional ratings
Review scores
Source	Rating
AllMusic	3/5 stars

Emperor is the debut EP by Norwegian black metal band Emperor. It was released in 1993 via Candlelight Records. In 1993, the EP was made into a split album with Enslaved's EP Hordanes Land.

In 1998, it was reissued with their demo Wrath of the Tyrant. The songs "Wrath of the Tyrant" and "Night of the Graveless Souls" were re-recorded and were originally on the Wrath of the Tyrant demo.

In 2013, Decibel ranked the split release at number 29 on its list of the Top 100 Black Metal Albums of All Time.

== Cover ==
The cover of the EP is an engraving by Gustave Doré called "Death on a Pale Horse".

== Track listing ==
No.	Title	Length
1.	"I Am the Black Wizards"	6:16
2.	"Wrath of the Tyrant"	4:14
3.	"Night of the Graveless Souls"	3:10
4.	"Cosmic Keys to My Creations and Times"	6:20
Total length:		20:00

== Personnel ==
Emperor

- Ihsahn – vocals, guitar, synthesizer
- Samoth – guitar
- Mortiis – bass
- Faust – drums

Additional personnel

- Emperor – producer
- Christophe Szpajdel – logo
