= Ámr =

Studio album by Ihsahn
- Released: 4 May 2018
- Studio: Fascination Street Studios; Mnemosyne Studio; Sonic Attic Studio
- Genre: Progressive metal; post-black metal
- Length: 43:53
- Label: Candlelight
- Producer: Ihsahn

Ihsahn chronology
Arktis (2016)	Ámr (2018)	Ihsahn (2024)

Professional ratings
Review scores
Source	Rating
Metal Injection	9/10
Metal Storm	8.2/10

Ámr (Old Norse poetic adjective that translates to "dark" or "darkish") is the seventh studio album by Norwegian black metal musician Ihsahn. The album was released on 4 May 2018 through Candlelight Records. Official videos were released for "Arcana Imperii", "Wake" and "Lend Me the Eyes of Millennia".

The deluxe edition also features a bonus track, which is a poem by Edgar Allan Poe.

== Track listing ==
All tracks are written by Ihsahn

No.	Title	Length
1.	"Lend Me the Eyes of Millennia"	5:47
2.	"Arcana Imperii"	4:53
3.	"Sámr"	5:27
4.	"One Less Enemy"	5:17
5.	"Where You Are Lost and I Belong"	5:12
6.	"In Rites of Passage"	4:04
7.	"Marble Soul"	4:03
8.	"Twin Black Angels"	4:39
9.	"Wake"	4:27
Total length:		43:53

== Personnel ==
- Ihsahn – vocals, guitars, bass, keyboards, production

Additional musicians

- Tobias Ørnes Andersen – drums
- Fredrik Åkesson – additional guitar solo on "Arcana Imperii"
- Angell Solberg Tveitan – additional marching drum on "Where You Are Lost and I Belong"

Additional personnel

- Linus Corneliusson – mixing
- Jens Bogren – mastering
- Ritxi Ostáriz – design
- Bjørn Tore Moen – front cover photo

== Charts ==
Chart (2018)	Peak position
Belgian Albums (Ultratop Flanders)	145
US Heatseekers Albums (Billboard)	6
US Independent Albums (Billboard)	29
