= Lost in Reverie =

Studio album by Peccatum
- Released: 2004
- Recorded: 2004
- Genre: Avant-garde metal; progressive metal
- Length: 49:17
- Label: Mnemosyne Productions

Peccatum chronology
Amor Fati (2001)	Lost in Reverie (2004)	The Moribund People (EP) (2005)

Professional ratings
Review scores
Source	Rating
AllMusic	4/5 stars

Lost in Reverie is the third studio album from the Norwegian heavy metal band Peccatum. It was released in 2004 on Mnemosyne Productions, the label run by band members Ihsahn and Ihriel.

== Track listing ==
- All songs written by Ihriel and Ihsahn.
1. "Desolate Ever After" - 8:26
2. "In the Bodiless Heart" - 7:03
3. "Parasite My Heart" - 6:23
4. "Veils of Blue" - 6:05
5. "Black Star" - 8:14
6. "Stillness" - 7:12
7. "The Banks of This River Is Night" - 6:34

== Personnel ==
- Ihsahn – vocals, keyboards, programming, guitar, bass-guitar, strings
- Ihriel – vocals, keyboards
- Jarle Havrås – drums
- Knut Aalefjær – drums and percussion on 2, 3, 4, 5
- PZ – vocals on 3, 5
- Einar Solberg – vocals on 3, 5
