= Arktis =

Studio album by Ihsahn
- Released: 8 April 2016
- Genre: Progressive metal; black metal; avant-garde metal
- Length: 48:12
- Label: Candlelight
- Producer: Ihsahn

Ihsahn chronology
Das Seelenbrechen (2013)	Arktis (2016)	Ámr (2018)

Professional ratings
Review scores
Source	Rating
Exclaim!	8/10
MetalSucks	4/5 stars
PopMatters	8/10 stars
Ultimate Guitar	8.7/10

Arktis (stylized as Arktis., the Norwegian for "Arctic") is the sixth studio album by Norwegian black metal musician Ihsahn. The album was released on 8 April 2016 through Candlelight Records.

== Track listing ==
No.	Title	Length
1.	"Disassembled" (featuring Einar Solberg)	5:02
2.	"Mass Darkness" (featuring Matt Heafy)	3:52
3.	"My Heart Is of the North"	4:43
4.	"South Winds"	5:34
5.	"In the Vaults"	4:09
6.	"Until I Too Dissolve"	5:24
7.	"Pressure"	6:04
8.	"Frail"	3:39
9.	"Crooked Red Line" (featuring Jørgen Munkeby)	4:16
10.	"Celestial Violence" (featuring Einar Solberg)	5:24
Total length:		48:12

Bonus track
No.	Title	Length
11.	"Til Tor Ulven (Søppelsolen)" (featuring Hans Herbjørnsrud)	9:13
