= In the Nightside Eclipse =

Studio album by Emperor
- Released: 21 February 1994
- Recorded: July 1993
- Studios: Grieg Hall, Bergen
- Genre: Symphonic black metal
- Length: 48:29
- Label: Candlelight
- Producers: Emperor, Pytten

Emperor chronology
As the Shadows Rise (1994)	In the Nightside Eclipse (1994)	Anthems to the Welkin at Dusk (1997)

In the Nightside Eclipse is the debut studio album by Norwegian black metal band Emperor, released in 1994 through Candlelight Records. It was their only album with drummer Faust and one-time bassist Tchort. Considered a landmark in the black metal scene, the album has been ranked by critics as one of the most influential albums of the genre. It contains some of Emperor's best known tracks, "I Am the Black Wizards" and "Inno a Satana".

== Recording and production ==
The album was co-produced by Pytten, who produced Mayhem's De Mysteriis Dom Sathanas and Burzum's debut album, as well as albums by Immortal and Enslaved. Faust partially credits Pytten with the sound of In the Nightside Eclipse.

Most of the music was written and rehearsed before the band entered the studio. However, much of the symphonic keyboard sections were composed in the studio at the time of recording as the band did not then have a permanent keyboard player.

Ihsahn was 17 years old at the time of the album's recording, and because he was unable to join the rest of the band members in festivities at the local "rock pubs" in Bergen after the album's recording sessions, he spent large amounts of time in the studio working with audio engineer Pytten. Ihsahn had a preexisting interest in audio engineering and took instruction on recording technology from Pytten.

Although the album was recorded in July 1993, it was not mixed until the following year due to Faust and Samoth's arrests and sentences in jail. In the end, only Ihsahn and Samoth were present for the mixing of the album, though Faust passed along his input to them in a letter. Ihsahn was ill at the time of recording, and Tchort recalls him spitting blood while recording vocals for the album. Some of the early vocal takes were replaced with ones recorded after he had recovered, as were some of the keyboard parts.

Pytten would later be quoted as follows regarding his feelings on the finished product: "With such long times working on the production, so many hours in the studio, so many replays of the songs, so many tries to get the music right, I can go on... I have to admit my first feeling was relief! But the way I see the album after the fatigue left me is that I have never thought, 'Oh if I only had done so and so instead...' I think, whatever words are put on the production, this is a captured sound that has a lasting quality. I am quite proud of what we all achieved."

== Artwork ==
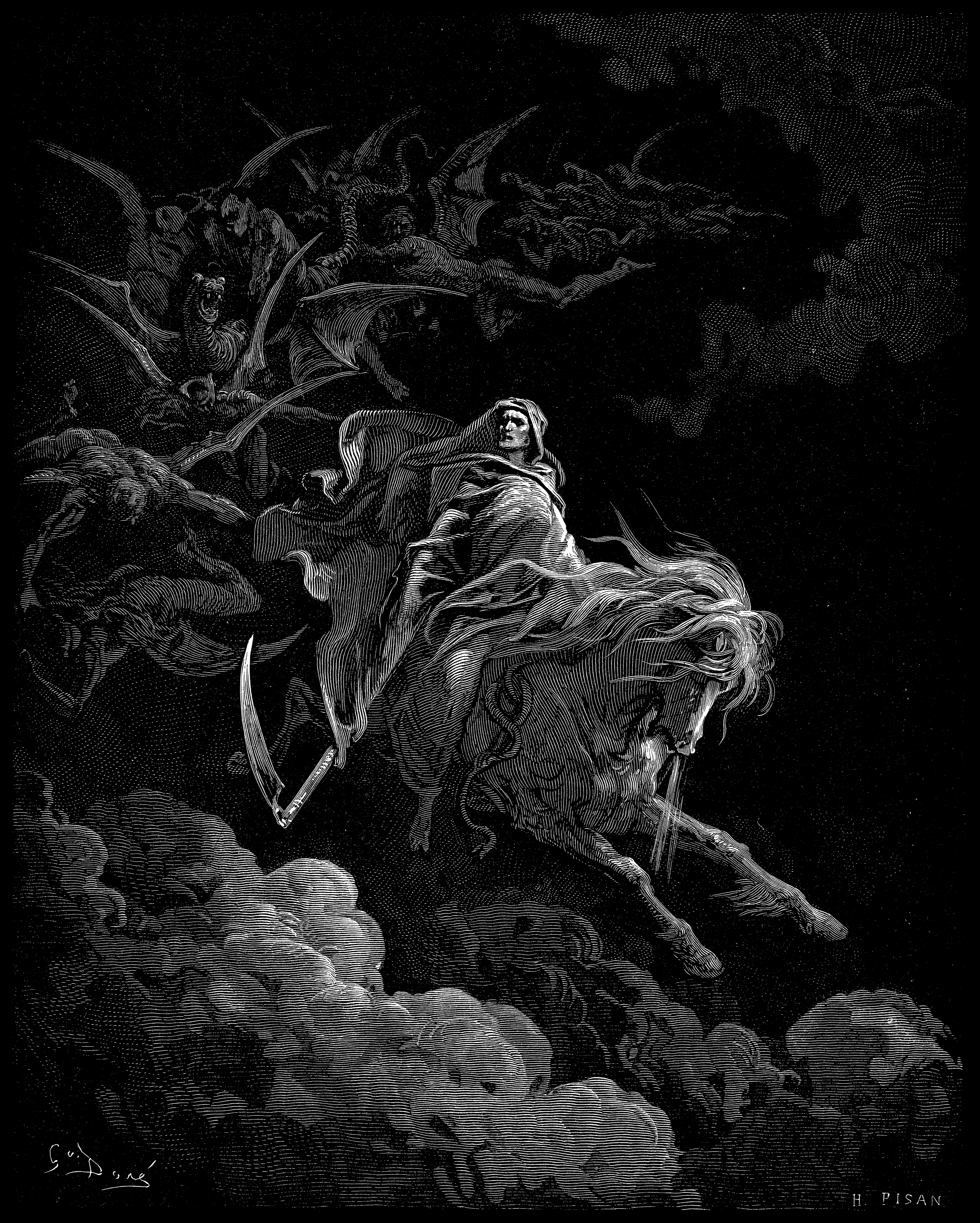
Death on the Pale Horse by Gustave Doré

The album cover was drawn by Kristian Wåhlin, also known as "Necrolord", depicting a host of orcs en route to Minas Morgul. The part below the band logo is based upon a section of a larger engraving called Death on the Pale Horse by Gustave Doré. That section itself was also used as the album cover for the Emperor (EP).

The interior artwork features a photograph of the Trascau Fortress in Transylvania.

== Music and lyrics ==
In the Nightside Eclipse has often been referred to as a pioneering influence in symphonic black metal. Although all the key elements of black metal are present, such as fast tremolo-picked guitar passages, harsh screams, and raw, lo-fi production, the use of symphonic keyboard sections is a key part of the album's distinctive sound. According to Steve Huey of AllMusic, "Even if the keyboards mostly just outline basic chord changes, they add a melancholy air to all the furious extreme sounds, turning the one-note ugliness of black metal into something emotionally complex." Kerrang said, "proving that [black metal] wasn’t all about primitivism, instead the composition here is technically and creatively staggering, with ethereal keyboards adding a freezing atmosphere." Ihsahn said: "We had no commercial ambitions; there were none to have. It sounds romantic, but all this music was made purely with artistic motivations, this total, introverted, Norwegian 'keep it to ourselves' attitude is what enabled us to create something that no one else had done."

Some of the lyrics on the final version of the album were partially written by Mortiis, before he left the band. Samoth has suggested that the frequent use of the word "emperor" in the lyrics became a kind of metaphor, "for our own entity, for the dark lord, for the devil, for the strong and mighty." Samoth has cited the power of Norwegian nature as a key inspiration on Emperor's music and this album in particular. They also expressed a fascination with the Viking age, Tolkien's literature, story of Dracula, as well as "everything related to Transylvania, the Carpathian Mountains, the dark corners of Eastern Europe, and folklore." Ihsahn, however, has explained that he never read much of Tolkien's work, although he consciously made use of the language and imagery of fantasy.

== Critical reception ==
Professional ratings
Review scores
Source	Rating
AllMusic	5/5 stars
Chronicles of Chaos	6/10
Collector's Guide to Heavy Metal	7/10
Sputnikmusic	5/5

In his review, Steve Huey of AllMusic gave the album five stars out of five, writing, "In the Nightside Eclipse resoundingly demonstrated that there was real musical substance and ambition in the world of black metal. [...] [it] somehow managed to capture the essence of the genre while completely rewriting its rule book", stating that it was also "the first [album] to fuse black metal with progressive and symphonic elements, setting the stage for a bevy of future experimentation in the genre, [...] As such, it certainly possesses the farthest-reaching legacy of anything from Norway's bloody first wave, and ranks as one of the most important heavy metal albums of the '90s." Kyle Ward of Sputnikmusic wrote that "In the Nightside Eclipse is a masterwork because of this compositional balance. It allows the keys to be overbearing without stealing the show – an attribute that the lack of which has since proven to be the downfall of countless symphonic black metal acts. This is still, at its core, a harsh, obscenely heavy record, and one only needs to place themselves in the maelstrom of tracks like 'I Am the Black Wizards' to realize there is more than just symphonies at work here."

Not all assessments were positive. Brian Mellon of Chronicles of Chaos lamented a lack of clarity in the guitar sound and stated that "only a couple of the tracks are actually memorable". In 2011, Kevin Stewart-Panko of Decibel stated his opinion that Emperor, and Nightside in particular, were overrated. In his retrospective review, he said: "I know this album is considered a black metal touchstone, but I don’t get it. This probably speaks to my general dislike of whatever comes out of the starting blocks with: 'troo kvlt' written all over its corpsepainted ball sack more than anything, but after all of Norwegian black metal’s church burning, murder and mayhem, I always expected the resultant music to drip with acrimony, menace and pure skullfucking hatred. Most of it didn’t, especially In the Nightside Eclipse, because the album always seemed more like a glittery and chintzy exposition of how many bells and whistles could be layered onto a series of songs during the mixing process instead of the dark and terrifying slice of bombast it’s supposed to be – or I assumed it would be."

== Legacy and impact ==
Looking at Nightside, I think there was a lot of buzz and hype about the album even before it came out—with advance tracks spreading around the world, there was a lot of anticipation in the underground about the release. When it finally came out, it quickly became an album that led to a lot of influences in the growing black metal scene—or black metal boom, rather.

— Samoth (2016)

The album is widely considered one of the most important releases in black metal, particularly for the second wave of black metal, and has been frequently described as a classic by music critics. The album has gone on to influence countless bands, with many considering it the first true symphonic black metal album. Kyle Ward of SputnikMusic credits Emperor with "[taking] the genre in a direction now seen as a natural extension of black metal's sphere of influence." It is the only Emperor album to feature Tchort on bass, who later went on to play with Carpathian Forest, Blood Red Throne, and others. In 2005 the magazine Decibel adopted the album into their hall of fame, writing that "upon its release in 1995, In the Nightside Eclipse established Emperor as the reigning masters of a more complex, atmospheric style of "symphonic black metal". They also called it "one of the most historically fascinating and sonically influential albums in the annals of extreme metal." That same year, the album was ranked number 292 in Rock Hard magazine's book The 500 Greatest Rock & Metal Albums of All Time. In 2009, Loudwire named it the 18th best debut album of all time. In 2009, IGN included In the Nightside Eclipse in their "10 Great Black Metal Albums" list; according to IGN, "Emperor inspired the wave of overtly-technical black-metal bands that would rule the underground in the early 2000s. Dimmu Borgir and Cradle of Filth owe a huge debt to this album."

In 2013, Decibel ranked In the Nightside Eclipse at number four on its list of the Top 100 Black Metal Albums of All Time. In February 2014, Matt Heafy of Trivium wrote that "Emperor had crafted a unique sound in its combination of the classical with modern metal conventions that had not been executed with such precision before." In July of that same year, In the Nightside Eclipse was listed at number three in Guitar World magazine's list of "Superunknown: 50 Iconic Albums That Defined 1994". In 2018, the staff of Revolver included the album in their list of the "25 Essential Black-Metal Albums".

In 2019, Ihsahn was quoted as follows regarding his perception of the album 25 years following its release: "I always look back at albums and think, 'Ah, I could have changed that', but then you go beyond that, it becomes so old that you just appreciate it for being a representation of where you were at that point. And this wasn’t just 25 years ago, it’s almost like another life, being basically a kid. [...] That whole time formed the basis of me being able to do this for 25 years. What a stroke of luck! It’s almost paradoxical to be so thankful for black metal, given the evilness of it all."

In 2020, Nick Ruskell of Kerrang! wrote: "It would be inaccurate to say that In The Nightside Eclipse had a Nevermind effect upon its release. Black metal was still a staunchly underground movement, both by non-commercial intent, and simply because such extreme music doesn’t sell in such quantities. It also came during a truly fecund period, where essential albums like Mayhem’s De Mysteriis Dom Sathanas, Immortal’s Pure Holocaust and Darkthrone’s Under a Funeral Moon would all emerge in a relatively short time. But as time has gone on, it has retained an authority that remains ahead of the pack even now. And always will do." In 2021, the album was elected by Metal Hammer as the best symphonic metal album of all time.

== Reissues ==
In 1999, the album was remastered and reissued, with two cover songs as bonus tracks: "A Fine Day to Die" by Bathory, and "Gypsy" by Mercyful Fate. For the reissue, the opening tracks "Intro" and "Into the Infinity of Thoughts" were combined, whilst the album was packaged in a paper slipcase covering the traditional jewel case, with both featuring the same artwork. A second reissue followed in 2004, which included videos of live performances from 1997. In 2014, in celebration of the album's 20th anniversary, the band reissued a remastered deluxe version of the album. It also featured the bonus tracks from the As the Shadows Rise 1994 EP, as well as a previously unreleased alternative mix of the album and pre-production rehearsal tracks from 1993. The album was remastered by Jens Bogren at Fascination Street Studios in 2014.

== Track listing ==
All music is composed by Vegard Tveitan and Tomas Haugen, except where noted.

No.	Title	Lyrics	Music	Length
1.	"Intro" ( (Note: "Intro" is not mentioned on the back cover on the regular editions.))	Instrumental		0:51
2.	"Into the Infinity of Thoughts"	Haugen		8:15
3.	"The Burning Shadows of Silence"	Tveitan, Haugen		5:36
4.	"Cosmic Keys to My Creations & Times"	Håvard Ellefsen		6:06
5.	"Beyond the Great Vast Forest"	Haugen		6:01
6.	"Towards the Pantheon"	Tveitan, Haugen		5:57
7.	"The Majesty of the Night Sky"	Tveitan	Tveitan	4:54
8.	"I Am the Black Wizards"	Ellefsen		6:01
9.	"Inno a Satana" (Italian for "Hymn to Satan", Latin for "I Sing to Satan")	Tveitan		4:48
Total length:				48:29

Notes

1999 remastered edition
No.	Title	Writer(s)	Length
1.	"Intro/Into the Infinity of Thoughts"		9:06
2.	"The Burning Shadows of Silence"		5:35
3.	"Cosmic Keys to My Creations & Times"		6:06
4.	"Beyond the Great Vast Forest"		6:00
5.	"Towards the Pantheon"		5:58
6.	"The Majesty of the Nightsky"		4:53
7.	"I Am the Black Wizards"		6:00
8.	"Inno a Satana"		4:48
9.	"A Fine Day to Die" (Bathory cover)	Thomas Forsberg	8:28
10.	"Gypsy" (Mercyful Fate cover)	Kim Petersen, Michael Denner	2:57
Total length:			59:51

== Personnel ==
Emperor

- Ihsahn – vocals, lead guitar, keyboards
- Samoth – rhythm guitar
- Tchort – bass guitar
- Faust – drums

Additional musicians

- Alver – bass (tracks 9, 10 on 1999 edition)
- Trym – drums (tracks 9, 10 on 1999 edition)
- Charmand Grimloch – keyboard (track 10 on 1999 edition)

Technical staff

- Pytten – producer, engineer
- Tim Turan – mastering with Emperor
- Christophe Szpajdel – logo
