= Joachim Rygg =

Norwegian musician

- Also known as: Charmand Grimloch
- Origin: Norway
- Genres: Symphonic black metal

Joachim Rygg is a Norwegian musician. He is also known by his stage name Charmand Grimloch, and was the sole musical force in the symphonic black metal project Tartaros. He has since moved to the United States and composes music for films.

== Background ==
Rygg was originally a session musician for fellow Norwegian symphonic black metal band Emperor.

Rygg moved to the United States and has composed music for the soundtracks to films and television series, including Center Stage 2, American Pie: The Naked Mile and Save the Last Dance 2.

Rygg is now active in the songwriting community, with credits on Elephante's hit "Dynasty".

== Discography ==
as Tartaros

- The Heritage from the Past (1994; EP)
- The Grand Psychotic Castle (1997; EP)
- The Red Jewel (1999)

with Emperor

- Emperial Live Ceremony (2000; CD, CS, LP, VHS, DVD)
