= Anthems to the Welkin at Dusk =

Studio album by Emperor
- Released: 19 May 1997
- Recorded: October–December 1996
- Studios: Grieg Hall (Bergen, Norway)
- Genre: Symphonic black metal
- Length: 43:55
- Labels: Candlelight, Century Black
- Producers: Eirik Hundvin, Ihsahn and Samoth

Emperor chronology
In the Nightside Eclipse (1994)	Anthems to the Welkin at Dusk (1997)	IX Equilibrium (1999)

Anthems to the Welkin at Dusk is the second studio album by Norwegian black metal band Emperor, released on 19 May 1997 through Candlelight Records and Century Black.

== Background ==
The album was recorded in the Grieg Hall in Bergen, Norway.

The opening guitar riff to "Ye Entrancemperium" is taken from an unnamed Mayhem song. As such, Mayhem guitarist Euronymous is credited in the album liner notes, even though he was murdered three years before the album was written and recorded. A recording of this unfinished track can be found on the Mayhem bootleg Ha Elm Zalag.

== Release ==
In 1996, the EP Reverence, which included the track "The Loss and Curse of Reverence", was released as a teaser for the album. Anthems to the Welkin at Dusk was released on 8 July 1997 through Candlelight Records. At the time of its release, it reached number 28 on Finnish album charts.

In contrast to the band's previous album, In the Nightside Eclipse, Anthems showcases a faster, more guitar-driven performance with less usage of keyboards and more clean singing and blast-beat style drumwork. The album's musical approach is explained on the back cover, with a quote that reads "Emperor performs Sophisticated Black Metal Art exclusively". As well, the album's lyrical themes began to move away from nature and satanic elements and began to incorporate more mystical themes.

In 1998, the album was remastered and re-released with the three non-album tracks from Reverence. The band made a promotional video for "The Loss and Curse of Reverence".

== Critical reception ==
Professional ratings
Review scores
Source	Rating
AllMusic	4.5/5 stars
Chronicles of Chaos	8.5/10
Collector's Guide to Heavy Metal	9/10
Rock Hard	9.0/10
Sputnikmusic	4.5/5 stars

According to Steve Huey from AllMusic, the album is a "magnificently-conceived and executed opus that fulfills all of Emperor's promise and ambition. The biggest difference from its predecessor [being] the crisper, clearer production, which allows details in the arrangements to emerge far more readily." He added that there's greater use of classical flourishes, greater variety in Ihsahn's vocals, more audible guitar interplay between Ihsahn and Samoth and more complex and melodic keyboard work, saying: "It definitely builds on the groundwork laid by extreme metal pioneers Celtic Frost and Bathory: the former with its restless experimentalism, and the latter with its determination to create something quintessentially Scandinavian." Finally, he concluded: "Anthems to the Welkin at Dusk cemented Emperor's reputation as black metal's greatest band, and Ihsahn as its foremost musical visionary; it also firmly established black metal as an art form that wasn't going away any time soon, and opened up a wide range of creative possibilities to the more progressive, eccentric wing of the genre. In the Nightside Eclipse might epitomize black metal better than any other album, but divorced from outside context, Anthems to the Welkin at Dusk is black metal's greatest stand-alone creative achievement."

The press agreed wholeheartedly: Anthems to the Welkin at Dusk appeared in many “Album of the Year” polls and won top honors in Terrorizer (UK) and Metal Maniacs (USA).

In 2013, Decibel ranked Anthems to the Welkin at Dusk at number 13 on its list of the Top 100 Black Metal Albums of All Time.

== Legacy and impact ==
Writing for Loudwire, music journalist Eduardo Rivadavia named the album as the greatest release in the black metal genre. He explained: "From its messy birth in the mitts of England’s Venom through to its revival by Norwegian bands like Mayhem and Darkthrone, black metal’s fundamental mission has been to frighten and offend with savage sounds and low fidelity recordings. But then came Emperor, with their rare musical sophistication and sculpting blackened symphonies such as 1996’s astonishing Anthems to the Welkin at Dusk – which still stands as the form’s ultimate mature creation."

The album was highly influential on the development of black metal in general following its release. Chris Dick of Decibel wrote that the album "set off a veritable artistic and commercial firestorm" within the genre. He stated: "Though prefaced four months by the Reverence EP, Emperor’s sophomore effort redefined black metal yet again. Like Dimmu Borgir’s breakout album Enthrone Darkness Triumphant months before, Emperor proved there was art and class behind the genre’s much-publicized lunacy. Where murder, arson and intrigue put Norway on the map, it was Emperor’s Wagnerian music that brought black metal and its new precepts to the fore." Greg Pratt of Decibel wrote that same year: "They played sophisticated black metal, and they played it exclusively, and in 1997, on their second full-length, no one could touch Norwegians Emperor at what they did. Anthems to the Welkin at Dusk is an absolutely majestic record, one that took black metal circa the mid ’90s and added in a touch of... well... sophistication, sure, but also an obvious growth as musicians as well as a nod to some trad metal sounds (which the band would explore more later)."

In June 2016, Anthems to the Welkin at Dusk was inducted into Decibel's Hall of Fame, becoming the second Emperor album to be featured in there, the first being predecessor In the Nightside Eclipse. In 2017, Rolling Stone ranked Anthems to the Welkin at Dusk as 57th on their list of 'The 100 Greatest Metal Albums of All Time.' In 2018, Loudwire named it the best black metal album of all-time. In 2020, Metal Hammer included it in their list of the top 10 1997 albums.

Loudwire considered it to be among the most essential metal releases of the 1990s for vinyl collectors.

== Track listing ==
All lyrics are written by Ihsahn.

No.	Title	Writer(s)	Length
1.	"Alsvartr (The Oath)"	Ihsahn	4:18
2.	"Ye Entrancemperium"	Ihsahn, Samoth, Euronymous	5:14
3.	"Thus Spake the Nightspirit"	Ihsahn	4:30
4.	"Ensorcelled by Khaos"	Ihsahn, Samoth	6:39
5.	"The Loss and Curse of Reverence"	Ihsahn, Samoth	6:09
6.	"The Acclamation of Bonds"	Ihsahn, Samoth	5:54
7.	"With Strength I Burn"	Ihsahn, Samoth	8:17
8.	"The Wanderer"	Samoth	2:54
Total length:			43:55

Re-release tracks
No.	Title	Length
9.	"In Longing Spirit"	5:55
10.	"Opus a Satana" (orchestral version of "Inno a Satana")	4:18
11.	"The Loss and Curse of Reverence - Live"	6:24
Total length:		60:32

== Credits ==
Emperor

- Ihsahn – vocals, guitar; synthesizer, arrangement, production and mastering
- Samoth – guitar, arrangement, mastering and production
- Alver – bass
- Trym – drums and percussion

Additional personnel

- Pytten – engineering and production
- Yens – sleeve photography
- Stephen O'Malley – sleeve design
- David Palser – sleeve photography
- Christophe Szpajdel – sleeve illustrations and logo
- N. A. P. – sleeve design
