= Ihsahn (album) =

Studio album by Ihsahn
- Released: 16 February 2024
- Recorded: 2022–2023
- Genre: Progressive metal; black metal; orchestral music
- Length: 48:40
- Label: Candlelight
- Producer: Ihsahn

Ihsahn chronology
Ámr (2018)	Ihsahn (2024)

Singles from Ihsahn
- 1. "Pilgrimage to Oblivion" Released: 16 November 2023; 2. "Twice Born" Released: 14 December 2023; 3. "The Distance Between Us" Released: 18 January 2024

Ihsahn is the eighth studio album by Norwegian black metal musician Ihsahn. It was released on 16 February 2024 through Candlelight Records and was self-produced by Ihsahn.

== Critical reception ==
Professional ratings
Review scores
Source	Rating
Blabbermouth.net	8.5/10
Distorted Sound	9/10
Kerrang!	4/5 stars
Metal Injection	8/10
MetalSucks	4.5/5 stars
Rock 'n' Load	10/10

The album received acclaim from critics. Jay H. Gorania from Blabbermouth.net gave the album 8.5 out of 10 and said: "There is no doubt that Ihsahn is one of metal's leading imaginative forces, and this self-titled release is possibly his solo career's high point." Dan McHugh of Distorted Sound scored the album 9 out of 10 and called the album "bold, adventurous and extravagantly experimental and this deserves the utmost applause." Kerrang! gave the album 4 out of 5 and stated: "Ihsahn's self-titled eighth solo work is an exercise in creativity, loose boundaries, and incredible talent, all the while also expressing that its creator knows exactly who he is."

Metal Injection rated the album 8 out of 10 and stated, "Overall, this is another solid LP from Ihsahn, though I must admit, I was hoping for some more music that focused more prominently on the integration of horns, which he did so well on songs like 2019's "Stridig". Nonetheless, Ihsahn fans will certainly be more than satisfied with these songs." Jordan Blum of MetalSucks rated the album 4.5 out of 5 and said: "Consequently, Ihsahn is another benchmark in Ihsahn's already pristine discography." Rock 'N' Load praised the album saying, "Ihsahn shows yet again what a brilliant and creative mind he has and more than that – the intellect to put the thought into stunning music sets him apart. Ihsahn is a stunning album and has to be an early contender for album of the year."

== Track listing ==
Ihsahn track listing
No.	Title	Length
1.	"Cervus Venator"	1:19
2.	"The Promethean Spark"	4:52
3.	"Pilgrimage to Oblivion"	4:20
4.	"Twice Born"	3:37
5.	"A Taste of the Ambrosia"	4:23
6.	"Anima Extraneae"	1:40
7.	"Blood Trails to Love"	5:05
8.	"Hubris and Blue Devils"	7:54
9.	"The Distance Between Us"	4:30
10.	"At the Heart of All Things Broken"	9:13
11.	"Sonata Profana"	1:44
Total length:		48:40

== Personnel ==
- Ihsahn – vocals, guitars, bass, keyboards, production

Additional musicians

- Tobias Ørnes Andersen – drums (tracks 2, 5, 7, 10)
- Tobias Øymo Solbakk – drums, percussion (tracks 3, 4, 8, 9)
- Chris Baum – violin
- Angell S. Tveitan – percussion

Additional personnel

- Tony Lindgren – engineering, mastering
- Jens Bogren, Ricardo Borges and Johan Martin – mixing
- Ritxi Ostáriz – design

== Charts ==
Chart performance for Ihsahn
Chart (2024)	Peak position
Belgian Albums (Ultratop Flanders)	34
Scottish Albums (OCC)	30
Swiss Albums (Schweizer Hitparade)	66
UK Album Downloads (OCC)	81
UK Rock & Metal Albums (OCC)	5
