= The Grand Psychotic Castle =

EP by Tartaros
- Released: 1997
- Recorded: 1996 at Wllothems and Grieghallen studios in Bergen, Norway
- Genre: Symphonic black metal
- Length: 25:04
- Label: Necropolis
- Producer: Crystalcave, Charmand Grimloch

Tartaros chronology
The Heritage from the Past (1994)	The Grand Psychotic Castle (1997)	The Red Jewel (1999)

Additional
- 1999 re-release album cover

The Grand Psychotic Castle is an EP and the second release by Norwegian symphonic black metal solo project Tartaros. It was released in 1997 through Necropolis Records.

== Critical reception ==
Chronicles of Chaos, while complimenting the album's "dark, ominous atmosphere", wrote that it is "damaged somewhat by a constantly intruding drum machine that does nothing to help the music except overpower it", finishing off with "for all its good points, the escalating and descending keyboards and the hollow, spooky atmosphere it creates, TGPC is far from perfect."

== Track listing ==
All music is composed by Charmand Grimloch

No.	Title	Length
1.	"Intro"	3:03
2.	"Dark Red Light upon the Bomos"	5:02
3.	"Images of the Mystic Sphere"	4:35
4.	"Tones Towards the Empyrean"	5:47
5.	"The Grand Psychotic Castle"	6:37
