= Ildjarn =

Background information
- Origin: Telemark, Norway
- Genres: Black metal, dark ambient
- Years active: 1991–2005
- Labels: Norse League Productions; Northern Heritage

Ildjarn was a Norwegian black metal project formed in 1991. Ildjarn recorded music until 1997 but did not officially end until 2005. Vidar Våer was the sole member of Ildjarn, although some releases were collaborations with Nidhogg.

== History ==
The band was formed in 1991. They played raw, fast, simple, lo-fi black metal; most songs composed of basic drum patterns, a couple of riffs, and unintelligible vocals. The band's style has been compared to hardcore punk for its simplicity and short songs. Two Ildjarn albums were made on a synthesizer. The only Ildjarn song to have its lyrics published was "Eksistensens Jeger", from the self-titled compilation Ildjarn-Nidhogg in 2003.

In 2006, the band website stated that no more news would be printed, leading to the conclusion that Ildjarn had ended. The title of Ildjarn's 2005 release, Ildjarn is Dead, supported that conclusion. Part of Vidar Våer's motivation for ending Ildjarn was his 4-track recorder breaking (the same 4-track recorder used during Emperor's early days as Thou Shalt Suffer).

== Related projects ==
The related band Sort Vokter consisted of Ildjarn, Nidhogg and two other members known as Tvigygre and Heiinghund. They released only one album called Folkloric Necro Metal.

== Discography ==
- 1992 – Unknown Truths – demo
- 1992 – Seven Harmonies of Unknown Truths – demo
- 1993 – Ildjarn – demo
- 1993 – Norse – EP (black metal release with Nidhogg)
- 1994 – Minnesjord – demo
- 1995 – Ildjarn – album
- 1996 – Forest Poetry – album
- 1996 – Landscapes – album
- 1996 – Strength and Anger – album
- 1996 – Svartfråd – EP (black metal release with Nidhogg)
- 2002 – Hardangervidda – album (ambient release with Nidhogg)
- 2002 – Hardangervidda Part 2 – EP (ambient release with Nidhogg)
- 2004 – Nocturnal Visions – EP

=== Compilation albums ===
- 1995 – Det Frysende Nordariket – contains Ildjarn Demo, Norse, Minnesjord
- 2002 – 1992-1995 – contains a collection of songs from 1992–1995
- 2003 – Ildjarn-Nidhogg – contains the two black metal releases with Nidhogg: Norse and Svartfråd
- 2005 – Ildjarn 93 – contains previously unreleased songs from 1993
- 2005 – Ildjarn is Dead – contains all demos and the outtakes from those demos

== Band members ==
- Ildjarn (Vidar Våer) – vocals, electric guitar, bass guitar, drums, synthesizer
- Nidhogg – vocals, synthesizer, keyboard, drums (On Ildjarn - Nidhogg releases)
- Samoth – vocals (occasional member)
- Ihsahn – vocals (occasional member)
