= Strangling from Within =

Strangling From Within

Studio album by Peccatum
- Released: 23 November 1999
- Genre: Progressive metal; avant-garde metal
- Length: 43:24
- Label: Candlelight

Peccatum chronology
Strangling From Within (1999)	Amor Fati (2000)

Strangling From Within was released on 23 November 1999 by the heavy metal project Peccatum.

Female Vocalist Ihriel contributes largely to the operatics and symphonic feel of the album. This is further achieved through use of various classical instruments that feature briefly or that may have a more pronounced role. Namely violins, cellos and harpsichords which are often played during sections of ambience and spoken interludes.

== Track listing ==
1. Where Do I Belong - 1:58
2. Speak of the Devil (As the Devil May Care) - 5:53
3. The Change - 3:01
4. The Song Which No Name Carry - 6:35
5. The Sand Was Made of Mountains - 3:02
6. I Breathe Without Access to Air - 3:50
7. The World of No Worlds - 8:46
8. And Pray for Me - 4:43
9. An Ovation to Art - 5:43

== Personnel ==
- Ihsahn – vocal, keyboards, strings
- Ihriel – vocals, keyboards
- Lord PZ – vocals
