= The Moribund People =

EP by Peccatum
- Released: 2005
- Genre: Progressive metal; avant-garde metal
- Length: 15:09
- Label: Mnemosyne Productions

Peccatum chronology
Lost in Reverie (2004)	The Moribund People (2005)

Professional ratings
Review scores
Source	Rating
Allmusic	link

The Moribund People is a 2005 EP by the heavy metal project Peccatum and their last release before they split up in 2006. On this EP, Peccatum's style hovers between black metal, modern classical and electronica.

It features the title track, another song called "A Penny's Worth Of Heart" and a cover of the song "For All Those Who Died", from the Bathory album Blood Fire Death. The EP also features the music video for the track "The Moribund People", Peccatum's first and only music video, in QuickTime format.

== Track listing ==
1. "The Moribund People" – 4:26
2. "A Penny's Worth of Heart" – 4:52
3. "For All Those Who Died" (Bathory cover) – 5:51

+ The Moribund People [*Video]

== Personnel ==
- Ihsahn – vocals, keyboards, strings
- Ihriel – vocals, keyboards
- Jarle Havrås – drums
