= IX Equilibrium =

Studio album by Emperor
- Released: 15 March 1999
- Recorded: October 1998 – January 1999
- Studio: Akkerhaugen Lydstudio (Akkerhaugen, Norway)
- Genre: Symphonic black metal
- Length: 44:01
- Label: Candlelight (UK); Century Media (US)
- Producer: Emperor & Thorbjørn Akkerhaugen

Emperor chronology
Anthems to the Welkin at Dusk (1997)	IX Equilibrium (1999)	Prometheus: The Discipline of Fire & Demise (2001)

IX Equilibrium is the third studio album by the Norwegian black metal band Emperor, released on 15 March 1999 in Europe, and on 27 April 1999 in the US, through Candlelight Records.

== Reception ==
Professional ratings
Review scores
Source	Rating
AllMusic	4/5 stars
Chronicles of Chaos	7/10
Collector's Guide to Heavy Metal	9/10
Rock Hard	8.5/10

Eduardo Rivadavia of AllMusic describes the album as a "sonic onslaught of nearly impenetrable proportions".He noted that drummer Trym "doesn't so much keep time as pummel his kit incessantly", while guitarists Ihsahn and Samoth "contribute an equally oppressive wall of sound laced with keyboard textures so demonic they were seemingly concocted by the great horned one himself." He concluded, "Far from a masterpiece, but hardly a stinker either, IX Equilibrium falls quite short of the group's earlier albums through sheer lack of diversity, and will prove indigestible to all but the most committed black metal fans."

In 2021, it was named one of the 20 best metal albums of 1999 by Metal Hammer magazine. In 2023, Rolling Stone ranked the album's opening track, "Curse You All Men!", No. 42 on their list of "The 100 Greatest Heavy Metal Songs"

== Track listing ==
All lyrics are written by Ihsahn; all music is composed by Ihsahn and Samoth, except where noted.

No.	Title	Music	Length
1.	"Curse You All Men!"		4:41
2.	"Decrystallizing Reason"		6:23
3.	"An Elegy of Icaros"	Ihsahn	6:39
4.	"The Source of Icon E"		3:43
5.	"Sworn"		4:30
6.	"Nonus Aequilibrium"	Ihsahn	5:49
7.	"The Warriors of Modern Death"	Ihsahn	5:00
8.	"Of Blindness & Subsequent Seers"		6:48
9.	"Outro" (Hidden track)		0:28
Total length:			43:33

Digipack edition bonus tracks
No.	Title	Length
10.	"Curse You All Men!" (live at The Astoria, London July 1999)	4:34
11.	"Sworn" (remixed by Ulver at Endless Studios)	5:39

== Credits ==
Emperor

- Ihsahn – vocals, lead guitars, synth, and bass guitar
- Samoth – rhythm guitars
- Trym – drums, percussion

Technical staff

- Thorbjørn Akkerhaugen – producer, engineer
- Tom Kvålsvoll – mastering with Emperor
- Stephen O'Malley – cover design
- Knut Jacobsen – photography
- Christophe Szpajdel – logo
