= The Adversary (Ihsahn album) =

Studio album by Ihsahn
- Released: 10 April 2006
- Recorded: 2005–2006
- Genre: Progressive metal; black metal
- Length: 50:04
- Label: Mnemosyne; Candlelight
- Producer: Ihsahn

Ihsahn chronology
| The Adversary (2006) | angL (2008) |

Professional ratings
Review scores
| Source | Rating |
|---|---|
| About.com | 4/5 stars |
| AllMusic | 3.5/5 stars |
| Metal Storm | 6/10 |

The Adversary is the debut studio album by Norwegian black metal musician Ihsahn. Released on 10 April 2006, it is the first in a conceptual trilogy of albums including angL and After. It features a guest vocal appearance by Ulver's Garm. The album has been noted for its stylistic diversity, encompassing extreme metal as well as progressive and classic metal influences.

In 2024, Loudwire elected it as one of the 11 best progressive metal debut albums.

== Background ==
The album combines various extreme metal genres with progressive and classic metal in the vein of Judas Priest. According to Matt Mills of Metal Hammer: "[Ihsahn] intentionally regressed to his earliest influences: NWOBHM licks, symphonic swells and black metal tremolo picking alongside his seething screams. From that foundation, he built all kinds of weird shit." Ihsahn himself described The Adversary as "all over the place, with me trying out other subgenres in metal that I didn’t really have a go at before." He further explained of the album's diversity that it had its origins in a certain nostalgia:

It just kind of culminated into this. When I wanted to do a full on metal album, I wanted to bring in more heavy metal influences and more progressive rock stuff. I don't know how old you are, but I assume we are about the same age. You probably have some musical gems that you stored in your memory that you grew up with. They probably sound greater in your head than if you went and listened to the album again. It is that memory and emotion you have from that type of music. Without trying to duplicate it musically, I have been wanting to create a similar atmosphere and feeling from what I remember back then. It is very much a historical feel. For me personally, a great part of music is the way music builds up into something; those small seconds where everything is perfect. It gives you a religious feeling. I just want to use that energy and put that into it as well. I did this more than thinking of genre terms and technical terms in writing the album.

Ihsahn described his intention with the production as realizing "a more sparse sound picture, inspired by more '70s metal. I also mixed that album in an analog studio with equipment from the '50s, '60s and '70s and didn't overdub any guitars."

Several songs quote Friedrich Nietzsche's Thus Spoke Zarathustra, which Ihsahn has cited this as a key influence "not just because of the philosophical themes, but also the beauty of the language, the whole kind of religious undertone in this very ungodly philosophy."

== Track listing ==
All tracks are written by Ihsahn.

| No. | Title | Length |
|---|---|---|
| 1. | "Invocation" | 5:07 |
| 2. | "Called by the Fire" | 4:56 |
| 3. | "Citizen" | 5:21 |
| 4. | "Homecoming" | 4:19 |
| 5. | "Astera Ton Proinon" | 5:09 |
| 6. | "Panem et Circenses" | 4:54 |
| 7. | "And He Shall Walk in Empty Places" | 4:51 |
| 8. | "Will You Love Me Now?" | 5:03 |
| 9. | "The Pain Is Still Mine" | 10:19 |
| Total length: | | 50:04 |

== Personnel ==
- Ihsahn – vocals, all other instruments, arrangements, engineering, production, mixing

Additional musicians

- Asgeir Mickelson – drums, drum engineering and editing, vocal engineering on track "Homecoming"
- Garm – guest vocals on track "Homecoming"

Additional personnel

- Tore Ylwizaker – vocal engineering on track "Homecoming"
- Tom Kvålsvoll – mastering
