= Prometheus: The Discipline of Fire & Demise =

Studio album by Emperor
- Released: 21 October 2001
- Recorded: 2000–2001
- Studio: Symphonique Studios (rhythm, lead and additional guitars, keyboards, synthesizers, bass, vocals); Akkerhaugen Lydstudio (Akkerhaugen, Norway; drums, percussion and "amp-dubs")
- Genre: Black metal; progressive metal
- Length: 51:51
- Label: Candlelight, Nuclear Blast
- Producer: Ihsahn

Emperor chronology
IX Equilibrium (1999)	Prometheus: The Discipline of Fire & Demise (2001)	Scattered Ashes: A Decade of Emperial Wrath (2003)

Prometheus: The Discipline of Fire & Demise is the fourth and final studio album by Norwegian black metal band Emperor, released on 21 October 2001 through Candlelight Records. The album differs from Emperor's previous offerings with a focus on a more progressive style.

The album was nominated for a Spellemann Award for Best Metal album in 2001.

== Release and reception ==
Professional ratings
Review scores
Source	Rating
AllMusic	4.5/5 stars
Alternative Press	8/10
Chronicles of Chaos	7/10
Kerrang!	5/5 stars
Rock Sound	4.5/5 stars

Prometheus: The Discipline of Fire & Demise failed to chart in North America and Europe. A music video was made for the song "Empty" and released on 8 October 2001.

The album received critical praise from music critics. Reviews from metal-based magazine Kerrang! declared it their album of the week on 10 October, comparing it to Metallica's Master of Puppets in terms of quality, while the magazine Terrorizer picked it as album of the month. John Serba of the online music database AllMusic praised the album, stating "Those willing to invest a significant amount of time into Prometheus will be thoroughly rewarded on intellectual and emotional levels [...] while more practical listeners unwilling to slap on headphones and willfully ingest the lyrics will find the record impenetrable", calling the album a "birth-to-death concept album of such weight and density that it takes roughly two dozen listens to even begin to appreciate the depth of its composition and its painstaking attention to detail."

In 2003, in a review of Emperor's compilation album Scattered Ashes: A Decade of Emperial Wrath, Dominique Leon of Pitchfork referred to Prometheus as "fairly amazing", and "arguably [Emperor's] most technically and compositionally complex album".

== Track listing ==
All tracks are written by Ihsahn.

No.	Title	Length
1.	"The Eruption"	6:28
2.	"Depraved"	6:32
3.	"Empty"	4:16
4.	"The Prophet"	5:41
5.	"The Tongue of Fire"	7:10
6.	"In the Wordless Chamber"	5:12
7.	"Grey"	5:05
8.	"He Who Sought the Fire"	5:28
9.	"Thorns on My Grave"	5:55
Total length:		51:51

== Personnel ==
Emperor

- Ihsahn – vocals, lead and rhythm guitar, synthesizer, bass guitar, programming, arrangement and mixing
- Samoth – additional guitar
- Trym – drums and percussion

Technical staff

- Thorbjørn Akkerhaugen – mixing
- Tom Kvålsvoll – mastering
- Christophe Szpajdel – logo
