= Scattered Ashes: A Decade of Emperial Wrath =

Compilation album by Emperor
- Released: 25 March 2003
- Genre: Black metal; symphonic black metal
- Label: Candlelight

Emperor chronology
Prometheus: The Discipline of Fire & Demise (2001)	Scattered Ashes: A Decade of Emperial Wrath (2003)

Professional ratings
Review scores
Source	Rating
AllMusic	4/5 stars
Pitchfork	8.5/10

Scattered Ashes: A Decade of Emperial Wrath is the second compilation album by Norwegian black metal band Emperor, released on 25 March 2003 through Candlelight Records. The album contains 27 songs from ten different releases with a total running time of nearly two and a half hours. Limited pressings of the album came in a purple slipcase which featured the band logo wrapped around all four sides. As with the previous album, only a few thousand of these were produced, and the limited edition is these days a much-sought-after rarity.

The compilation set is split up in two discs. The first disc (on the packaging referred to as "The Black Disc") contains tracks from their studio releases, while the second disc ("The Silver Disc") lists unreleased and more obscure releases from the group. The songs are in no particular order; the discs jump back and forth between albums several times.

== Track listing ==
=== Disc One ===
1. "Curse You All Men!"
2. "The Tongue of Fire"
3. "The Majesty of the Nightsky"
4. "Cosmic Keys to My Creations and Times"
5. "Wrath of the Tyrant"
6. "The Loss and Curse of Reverence"
7. "An Elegy of Icaros"
8. "I Am the Black Wizards"
9. "Thus Spake the Nightspirit" (live)
10. "Ye Entrancemperium"
11. "In the Wordless Chamber"
12. "With Strength I Burn"
13. "Inno a Satana"

=== Disc Two ===
1. "A Fine Day to Die" (Bathory cover)
2. "Ærie Descent" (Thorns cover)
3. "Cromlech" (Darkthrone cover)
4. "Gypsy" (Mercyful Fate cover)
5. "Funeral Fog" (Mayhem cover feat. Attila Csihar)
6. "I Am"
7. "Sworn (Ulver remix)"
8. "Lord of the Storms"
9. "My Empire's Doom"
10. "Moon over Kara-Shehr" (rehearsal)
11. "Ancient Queen"
12. "Witches' Sabbath"
13. "In Longing Spirit"
14. "Opus a Satana" (orchestral version of "Inno a Satana")

== Credits ==
Additional personnel

- Christophe Szpajdel – logo
