= Starofash =

Norwegian musician and singer (born 1972)

- Born: 31 May 1972 (age 54)
- Origin: Norway
- Genres: Avant-garde metal, neoclassical
- Occupations: Musician, producer, writer, photographer
- Instruments: Vocals, keyboards, synthesizer
- Years active: 1998–present
- Label: Mnemosyne Productions
- Website: www.starofash.com

Heidi Solberg Tveitan (born 31 May 1972) is a Norwegian musician and singer currently known for her solo project Starofash (also known as Star of Ash). Tveitan was formerly half of the experimental band Peccatum, where she performed vocals, keyboards and synths and wrote the majority of lyrics, under the name Ihriel. She is the sister of Einar Solberg, the singer of Leprous, and the wife of Ihsahn of the black metal band Emperor, with whom she runs the production company Mnemosyne Productions as a music producer and manager.

== Biography ==
Tveitan was first introduced to music after taking singing and music lessons for many years. In 1998, she formed Peccatum with her husband Ihsahn and brother Lord Pz. Shortly after in 1999 Peccatum was signed to Candlelight Records and the first Peccatum album Strangling from Within was released. This was soon followed by an American and European tour. Tveitan claimed to work well musically in a "husband and wife" situation.

In 2000, Starofash performed at the Mystic Art Festival in Poland, along with the Inferno Festival in her homeland of Norway in 2001. It was also in 2001 that Starofash was signed to Jester Records. The project's first album, called Iter.Viator, was released in 2002, and it featured various guest artists. Among them are members of Emperor and Ulver.

In early March 2006, Peccatum announced their end leaving more time for their own individual projects. In October 2006, Tveitan announced a collaboration with the Japanese author Kenji Siratori. Siratori provided lyrics, spoken word vocals and the music video to the track "Neo Drugismo", which appeared on the second Starofash album The Thread.

Musically, Starofash uses experimental soundscapes over constantly changing sonic sceneries, where the compelling melody is often the leading thread from beginning to end. Tveitan currently lives in the woods of Telemark, where she writes music and lyrics, and pursues her interest in photography.

== Discography ==
=== Peccatum ===
- Strangling from Within - Candlelight Records (1999)
- Oh, My Regrets (EP) - Candlelight Records (2000)
- Amor Fati - Candlelight Records (2001)
- Lost in Reverie - VME/Mnemosyne (2004)
- The Moribund People (EP) - VME/Mnemosyne (2005)

=== Starofash ===
- Iter.Viator - Jester Records/VME (2002)
- The Thread - Candlelight - Mnemosyne (2008)
- Ulterior The Soundtrack - Mnemosyne (2009)
- Lakhesis - The End Records / Mnemosyne (2010)
- Ghouleh - Mnemosyne (2014)
- Skógr - Mnemosyne (2016)

=== Hardingrock ===
- Grimen - Nyrenning/Mnemosyne (2007)
