= AngL =

angL

Studio album by Ihsahn
- Released: 26 May 2008
- Recorded: 2007–2008
- Genre: Progressive metal; black metal
- Length: 47:22
- Label: Mnemosyne; Candlelight
- Producer: Ihsahn

Ihsahn chronology
The Adversary (2006)	angL (2008)	After (2010)

Professional ratings
Review scores
Source	Rating
All Metal Music	8.5/10 stars
AllMusic	4/5 stars
Cosmos Gaming	favorable

angL is the second studio album by Norwegian black metal musician Ihsahn. Writing began in early 2007, after Ihsahn had completed touring with Emperor. The album was recorded around December 2007 and released on 26 May 2008.

== Track listing ==
All tracks are written by Ihsahn.

No.	Title	Length
1.	"Misanthrope"	4:58
2.	"Scarab"	5:17
3.	"Unhealer" (featuring Mikael Åkerfeldt)	6:17
4.	"Emancipation"	5:27
5.	"Malediction"	4:19
6.	"Alchemist"	4:19
7.	"Elevator"	5:07
8.	"Threnody"	5:08
9.	"Monolith"	6:27
Total length:		47:22

Japanese bonus track
No.	Title	Length
10.	"Morningstar"	4:49

== Personnel ==
- Ihsahn – vocals, guitars, synthesizers, keyboards, production

Additional musicians

- Asgeir Mickelson – drums
- Lars K. Norberg – fretless bass
- Mikael Åkerfeldt – guest vocals on track "Unhealer"
