= After (Ihsahn album) =

Studio album by Ihsahn
- Released: 26 January 2010
- Recorded: 2009
- Studios: Symphonique Studio; Toproom Studio
- Genres: Progressive metal; post-black metal
- Length: 53:20
- Labels: Mnemosyne; Candlelight
- Producer: Ihsahn

Ihsahn chronology
angL (2008)	After (2010)	Eremita (2012)

Professional ratings
Review scores
Source	Rating
AllMusic	4/5 stars
The A.V. Club	(unfavorable)
Jukebox Metal	3/5 stars
PopMatters	(8/10)
Rock Sound	(9/10)
Thrash Hits	(5/6)

After is the third studio album by Norwegian black metal musician Ihsahn. This album is the final album in a planned trilogy of albums by Ihsahn.

== Background ==
Ihsahn stated that After, as the final album in the trilogy, departed from the preceding albums in order to bring the concept to a close:

For the third album, it has the title After because it is after the conflict. The whole concept is mellower and more laid back and more observant. There is no sign of life in any of the lyrics. It's vaguer in the landscapes. The first line on the first song on the album is, "These are barren lands of fair and cold." Musically and lyrically it's the end of the trilogy, so it's indicating that it's the end of this project in a way.

He further explained that the album was more abstract and possessed links to imagery expressed during his tenure with Emperor:

The first two albums are very niche-inspired and straight to the point. This album is all about what lies underneath all that, the more abstract essences of inspiration that I think have been with me from the start. Just as an example, when finishing the last song on the album, "On the Shores," I found myself having similar images in my head that I had with "With Strength I Burn," off the second Emperor album.

Through the YouTube channel of Mnemosyne Productions, there were three videos released that dealt with the recording of the album. The first video, released on 9 September 2009, focused on Ihsahn recording guitars. The second video, released on 25 November 2009, focused on the recording of the saxophone, drumming, vocals, and videotape. The third and final video was released on 11 January 2010, this time focusing more on the mixing stage of the album.

After is the first album written by Ihsahn in which he utilizes eight-string guitars. The use of a saxophone is also featured, which Ihsahn viewed as standing in lieu of his previous albums' guest vocalists (Garm and Mikael Åkerfeldt):

The reason I wanted to do the saxophone was because it was an old idea. I always liked the sound of the saxophone — it's a very solitary instrument. It's also in context with having guest soloists on the previous two albums in the form of vocals, Garm from Ulver and Mikael [Åkerfeldt] from Opeth. I wanted to follow that tradition, but in the concept of the album I didn't want it to be a voice with words. That's why I dug up the old saxophone idea...I think, or at least I hope, it will add to that more epic, open, solitary feeling of After. With Jurgen Munkeby playing it, I definitely think that worked. There was a risk that the saxophone would just be lying on top, almost like a shock effect. That’s really not what I was going for. I really wanted it to blend in a similar way as the orchestral strings and brass sections from the past.

== Track listing ==
All tracks are written by Ihsahn.

No.	Title	Length
1.	"The Barren Lands"	5:14
2.	"A Grave Inversed"	4:27
3.	"After"	4:49
4.	"Frozen Lakes on Mars"	5:56
5.	"Undercurrent"	10:02
6.	"Austere"	6:18
7.	"Heaven's Black Sea"	6:17
8.	"On the Shores"	10:12
Total length:		53:20

== Personnel ==
Credits adapted from album's liner notes.

- Ihsahn – vocals, guitar, keyboards, piano, production, arrangements, engineering, recording

Additional musicians

- Lars K. Norberg (of Spiral Architect) – fretless bass, engineering, recording
- Jørgen Munkeby (of Shining) – saxophone
- Asgeir Mickelson (of Borknagar and Spiral Architect) – drums, percussion, engineering, recording

Additional personnel

- Borge Finstad – engineering, recording
- Jens Bogren – mixing, mastering
