= Alver (bass player) =

Norwegian bass player (born 1973)

Jonas Alver (born 6 June 1973), better known by his stage name Alver, is a Norwegian bass player. He is known for his work in the black metal bands Emperor and Dødheimsgard.

== Discography ==
- Dødheimsgard – Monumental Possession
- Emperor – Anthems to the Welkin at Dusk
