= Emperor (Norwegian band) =

Norwegian black metal band

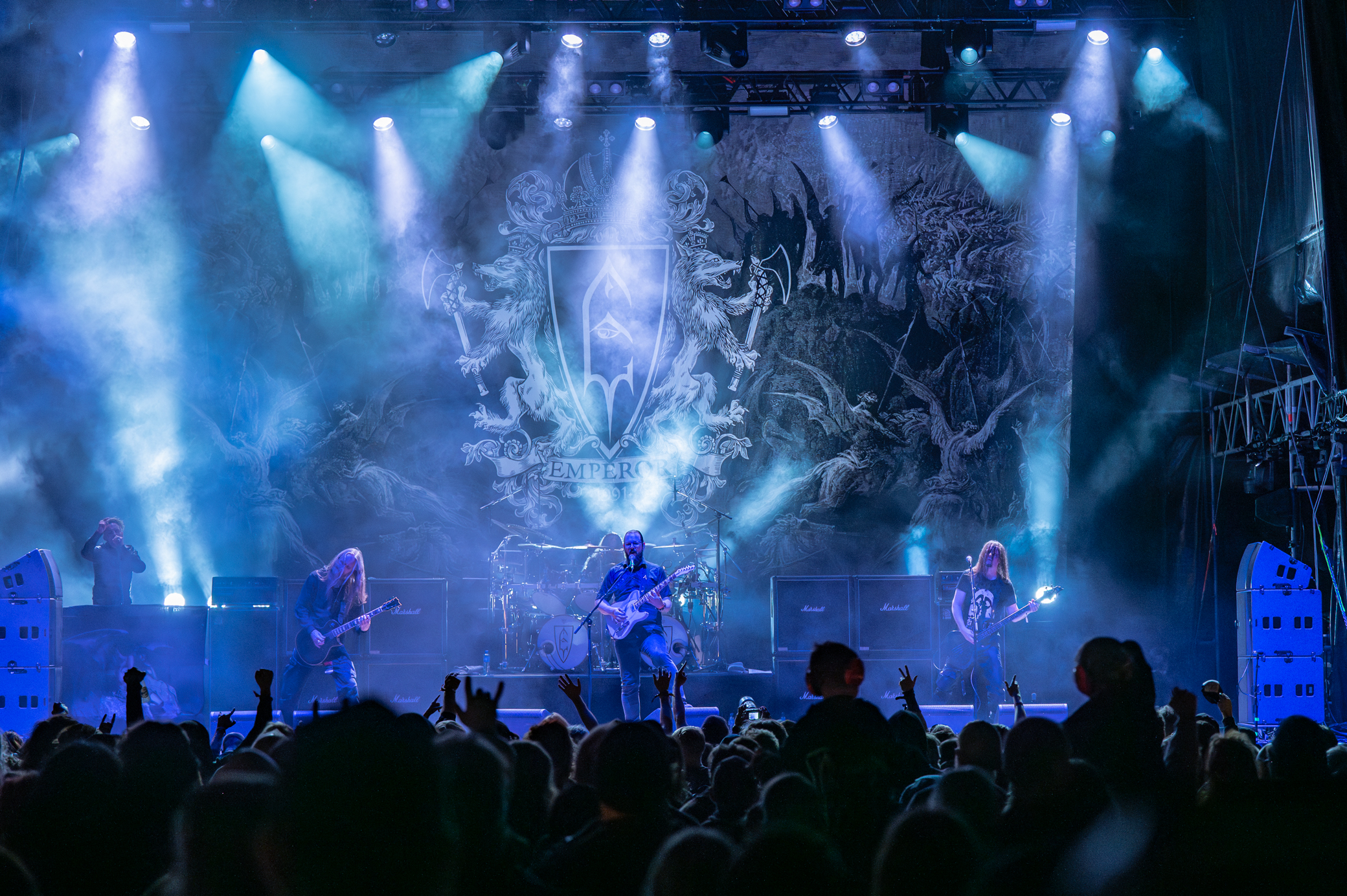
- Emperor in 2024

Background information
- Origin: Notodden, Norway
- Genres: Symphonic black metal; progressive metal
- Years active: 1991–2001; 2005–2007; 2013–2014; 2016–present
- Labels: Deathlike Silence; Century Media; Candlelight; Nuclear Blast
- Spinoffs: Zyklon; Peccatum; Mortiis
- Spinoff of: Thou Shalt Suffer
- Members: Ihsahn; Samoth; Trym
- Past members: Mortiis; Faust; Tchort; Alver
- Website: emperorhorde.com

Emperor is a Norwegian black metal band formed in 1991 by guitarist and vocalist Ihsahn and guitarist Samoth. The group split up in 2001, but reunited from 2005 to 2007 for a few festival dates and brief US tours, and again from 2013 to 2014. Emperor reformed a third time in 2016.

Emperor is considered influential on black metal by music journalists and members of the extreme metal community.

== History ==
Ihsahn and Samoth met at a blues/rock music seminar. The two began playing together as Dark Device, then Xerasia, then Embryonic. The group evolved into the band Thou Shalt Suffer. Samoth began to write music outside of Thou Shalt Suffer, and with Ihsahn and bass player Mortiis (later of his eponymous band Mortiis), Emperor was formed. After a while, the band released the demo Wrath of the Tyrant. It was popular in the underground and they signed with label Candlelight. Samoth moved to rhythm guitar, Ihsahn continued on vocals and lead guitar, and Faust was recruited as a drummer. Emperor released their debut EP, Emperor, on Candlelight Records. The band signed to Deathlike Silence Productions but never released any material on that label.

In the summer of 1992, the black metal inner circle began a series of events. Samoth and other black metallers burned down old Norwegian churches. Also in 1992, while Faust was in Lillehammer, Magne Andreassen suggested walking in the Olympic park forest. Once there, Faust claimed Andreassen made sexual advances, prompting Faust to stab him to death and kick his head to ensure he was dead. He was not convicted until two years later. The day after Faust killed Andreassen, he burned the Holmenkollen Chapel in Oslo with Euronymous of Mayhem and Varg Vikernes of Burzum. In the summer of 1993, the band began working on their first full-length album. Emperor ceased wearing corpse paint. They stated that it was becoming a trend and losing its meaning and symbolism. That autumn, the police began to investigate the murder of Euronymous of Mayhem, naming Varg Vikernes as a suspect. This investigation led to Samoth's incarceration for arson, and of Faust for the murder of Magne Andreassen.

In 1994, Samoth was sentenced to 16 months in prison for burning the Skjold Church in Vindafjord with Vikernes. The arson was committed during a pause in the recording of the Burzum EP Aske ('Ashes'). In 1994, In the Nightside Eclipse was released, and earned Emperor widespread acclaim and a large fanbase.

After Samoth's parole, drummer Trym and bassist Alver joined the band. At the end of 1996, Emperor recorded Anthems to the Welkin at Dusk, which won the 'album of the year' poll in many metal magazines, including UK Terrorizer and US Metal Maniacs. Alver left.

Aside from their European shows, the band played in Mexico City on 24 July 1999.

Continuing as a trio, with Ihsahn on keyboards, vocals, guitars and bass, the band recorded IX Equilibrium and toured Europe and North America. Around 2000, Samoth and Trym gravitated towards death metal, while Ihsahn focused on his side project, Peccatum. In 2001, Emperor disbanded after releasing Prometheus: The Discipline of Fire & Demise, written by Ihsahn. He later recalled, "When we announced the split up in 2001, we didn't think we would do anything more with Emperor ever again...The decision was also based on the feeling that Emperor had a lot of integrity, and that if we were going to end it, we should end it while we still created great music. For us, the decision was made in the black metal spirit. Since Samoth and I pulled in different directions, we didn't see any point in continuing. The core of the band wasn't intact anymore". Samoth echoed Ihsahn's position: "At that point, we both had other priorities that we wanted to pursue and we both felt that splitting up Emperor was the best thing to do. We really wanted to focus on other things, and felt it was the only right thing to do".

=== Hiatus and occasional live performances ===
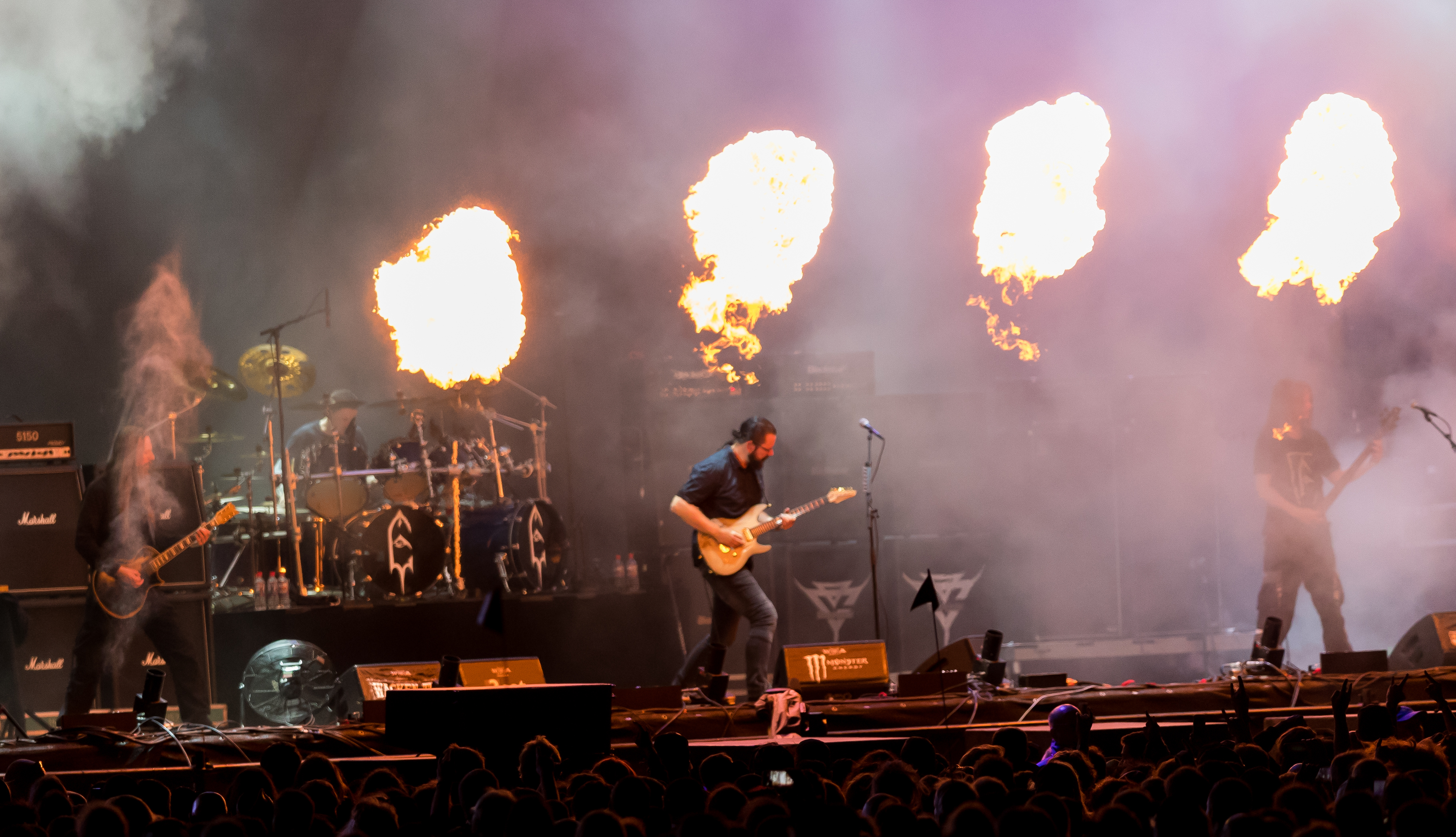
Emperor performing in 2017

Following the breakup, Samoth and Trym played in black/death metal band Zyklon, while Ihsahn focused on Peccatum. Later, Ihsahn announced a solo project in the vein of Prometheus: The Discipline of Fire & Demise and Peccatum, featuring drummer Asgeir Mickelson of Borknagar and Vintersorg. It generated positive feedback in the black metal community.

The band played a surprise three-song show in Oslo on 30 September 2005, at which they announced a series of concerts in California, New York City, and Europe in 2006. They played at the Inferno festival in April and Germany's Wacken Open Air in August. Samoth was unable to take part in the US tour dates, as his conviction for arson lengthened the visa application process. Emperor performed without him.

On 7 October 2006, Emperor performed at the under-18 Motstøy-festival in Notodden. The band had wanted to do an under-18 show and a hometown show; the festival fit both goals. It was held at a small venue called StuA, and with only 450 tickets available, the concert sold out.

On 28 October 2006, Emperor returned to the UK to play a show at London's Astoria venue, where fans greeted the band. In 2007, Emperor played a series of one-off shows in the United States and two festivals in France and Finland.

A tablature book based on the Scattered Ashes: A Decade of Emperial Wrath compilation album, containing thirteen Emperor tracks from their back catalogue, transcribed by Ihsahn with a foreword by him, was released 31 October 2007 via Candlelight Records. Emperor's albums were re-issued in a special box version with a bonus poster on 21 August 2007.

Samoth announced on 23 October 2007 that Emperor was preparing a second official DVD release. On 8 December 2008, it was revealed that this release would be called Live Inferno and come as a double-disc live album and a live DVD, taken from their appearances at Inferno and Wacken metal festivals during their brief reunion. It was released on 16 April 2009 in Europe and 21 April in North America.

On 2 August 2013, it was announced that Emperor would reunite to headline the 25th anniversary Wacken Festival in 2014. In the following months, they were announced as headliners for the 2014 editions of the Bloodstock Open Air and Hellfest festivals. In April 2014, they announced shows in Tokyo and Osaka for July with Trym playing drums due to Faust's visa issues.

On 12 August 2016, it was announced that Emperor would reunite again in 2017 for a special set of performances to celebrate the 20th anniversary of Anthems to the Welkin at Dusk.

On 27 December 2018, the band announced its presentation at the Mexico Metal Fest in Monterrey, Mexico in 2019.

Despite playing a handful of reunion shows, Ihsahn stated in 2019 that Emperor had no plans to record an album. He was quoted as saying, "It's kind of a lose-lose thing. The whole point of black metal, people want something that is real and has integrity of what it is. At this point, none of us can see any reason to do that beyond what we already do."

In 2023, Emperor toured the United States for the first time in 15 years, playing Anthems to the Welkin at Dusk in full. Emperor toured the United States again in 2025 to perform In the Nightside Eclipse in full. In 2026, they toured North America with Blood Incantation as support. The band is scheduled to appear at the 2026 Wacken Open Air music festival in Germany.

== Legacy ==
Emperor is regarded as highly influential by music critics and by emerging black metal bands. In 2016, Dayal Patterson of Metal Hammer wrote: "Emperor exploded onto the scene in the early 1990s and – though too young to legally enter a pub – quickly proved themselves to be one of Norway's most significant black metal bands. Twenty years later and their songs sound just as vital and powerful as ever, not to mention unique – despite their enduring popularity, it's interesting to note that far less bands have attempted to ape their style than other pioneers such as, say, Burzum and Darkthrone." In 2025, Jillian Drachman of Loudwire included the guitar duo of Ihsahn and Samoth in her list of "11 Best Black Metal Guitarists of All Time."

The band is also considered a pioneer of Viking metal, particularly via Ellefsen. AllMusic's Huey Long states that Ellefsen's short tenure in the band was "an indispensable force in the genesis of Norway's epic Viking metal sound", as it was his musical interests that catalyzed the band to mix chaotic black metal with synthesizer melodies based on Norwegian folk music.

== Controversy ==
In 1995, Ihsahn promoted arson in an interview: "Skjold Church was a large wooden church about 100 years old. The church contained an altar board and preaching chair from the 16th century. All this was said to be of historical, Christian value. So it was to be reduced to a pile of ashes. The material damages are set to be of 13 million Norwegian Kroner. The church was still being used by a large flock of blind followers. It became a victim for true Norwegian spirit on the 13th of September Anno 1992 during a stormy night. Witnessed by the moon, this symbolic act of anti-Christian war enlightened the night with pagan flames. Heathen barbarism is on the rise. We will bring back the forgotten past of strength, pride, and victory."

In 2014, Emperor attracted further controversy when Faust joined them for live performances. His prior convictions for murder and arson caused upset among some audiences.

== Band members ==
Emperor, band members at Rockharz 2026

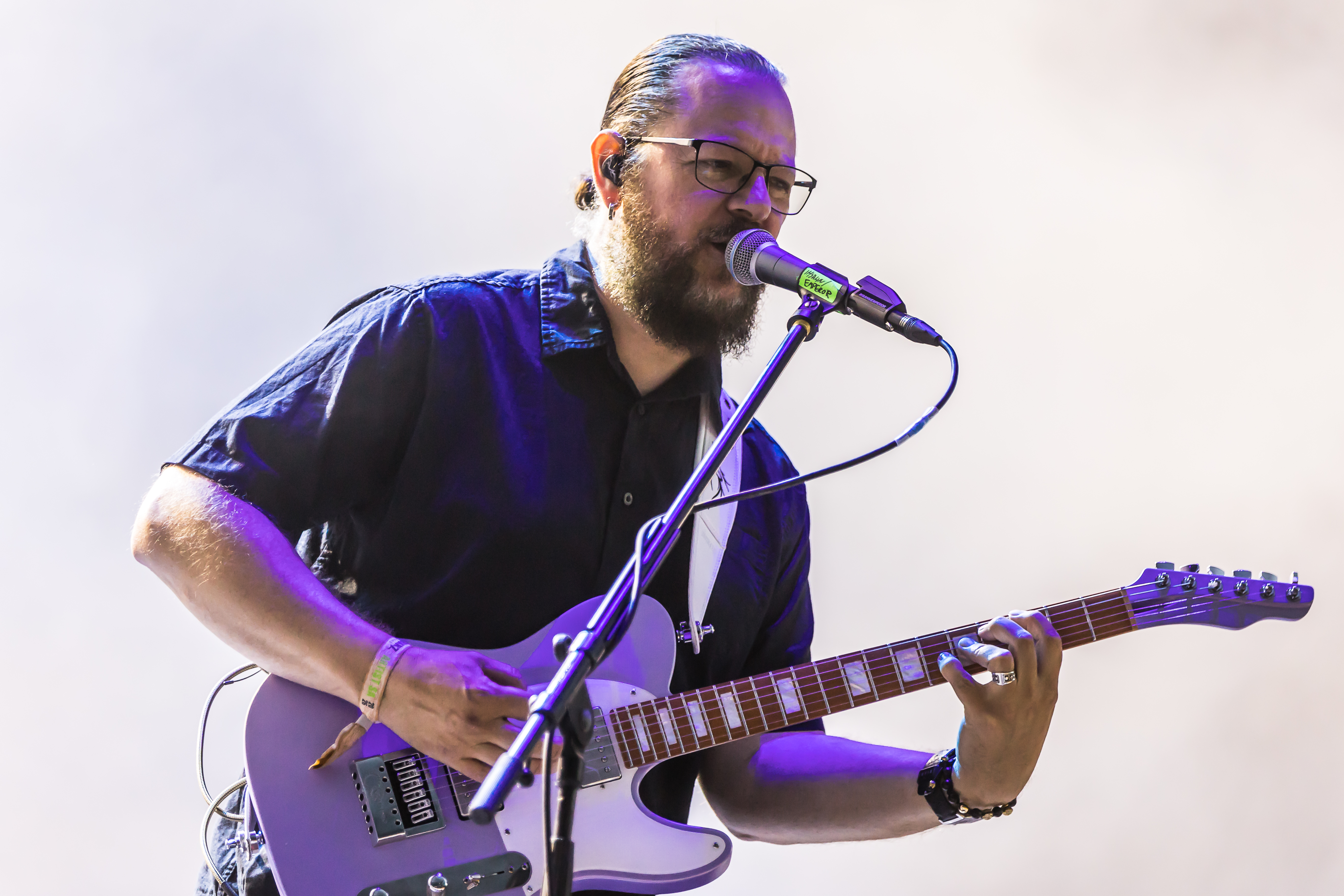
Vegard "Ihsahn" Tveitan

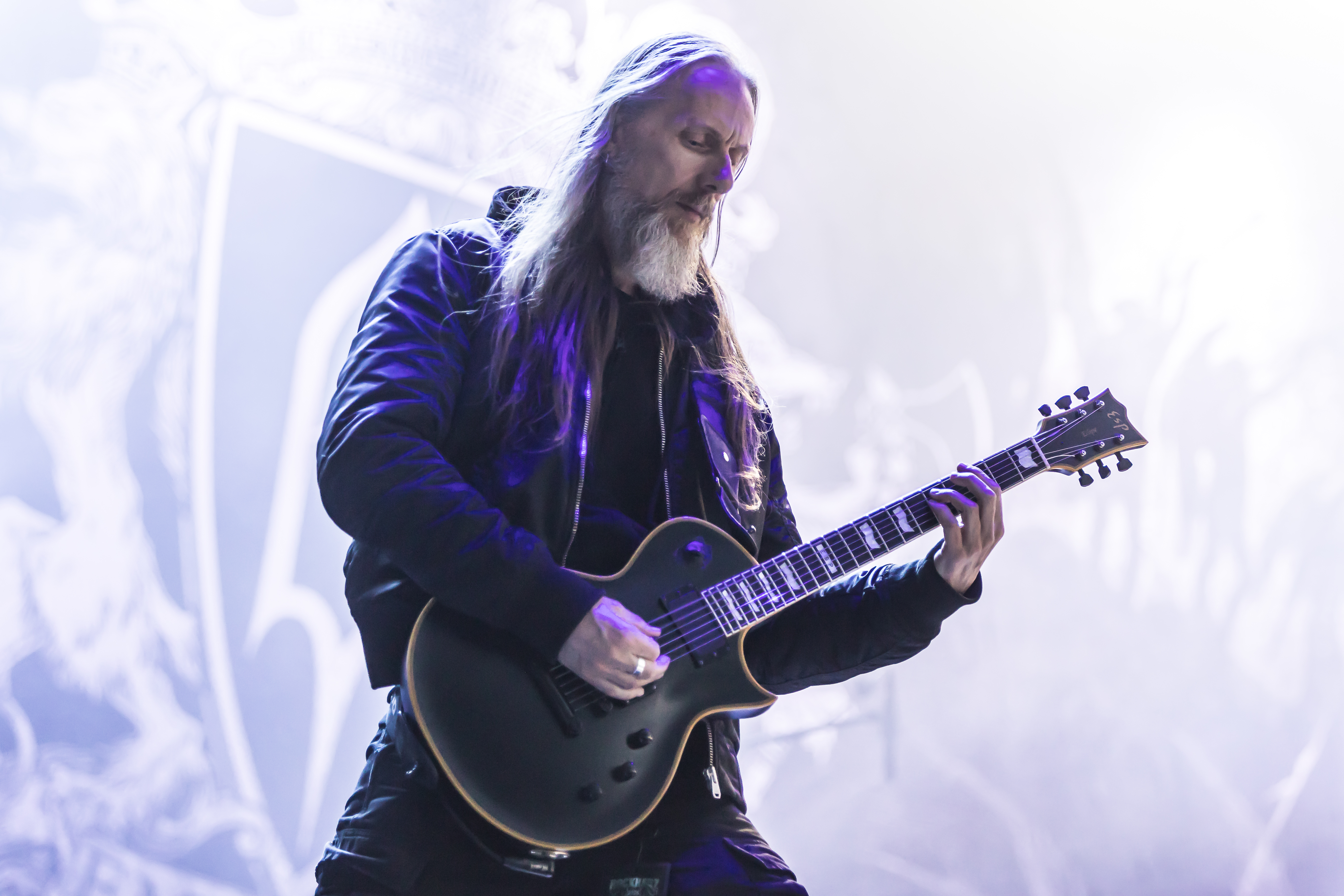
Tomas "Samoth" Haugen

=== Current ===
- Ihsahn – vocals, guitars, keyboards (1991–2001, 2005–2007, 2013–2014, 2016–present)
- Samoth – guitars (1992–2001, 2005–2007, 2013–2014, 2016–present), drums (1991–1992)
- Trym Torson – drums (1996–2001, 2005–2007, 2016–present)

=== Former ===
- Håvard "Mortiis" Ellefsen – bass (1991–1992)
- Bård "Faust" Eithun – drums (1992–1994, 2013–2014)
- Terje "Tchort" Schei – bass (1993–1994)
- Jonas "Alver" Alver – bass (1995–1998)

==== Live ====
Current

- Tony "Secthdamon" Ingebrigtsen – bass, backing vocals (2005–2007, 2013–2014, 2016–present)
- Jørgen Munkeby – keyboards, backing vocals (2018–present)

Former

- Vidar "Ildjarn" Våer – bass (1993)
- Steinar "Sverd" Johnsen – keyboards (1994–1995)
- Joachim "Charmand Grimloch" Rygg – keyboards (1996–1999)
- Jan Erik "Tyr" Torgersen – bass (1998–2001)
- Einar Solberg – keyboards, backing vocals (2005–2007, 2013–2014, 2016–2017)
- Gerlioz – keyboards (2018)
- Ole Vistnes – bass (2019, 2022–present)

== Discography ==
Studio albums

- In the Nightside Eclipse (1994)
- Anthems to the Welkin at Dusk (1997)
- IX Equilibrium (1999)
- Prometheus: The Discipline of Fire & Demise (2001)
