= Peccatum =

Norwegian heavy metal band

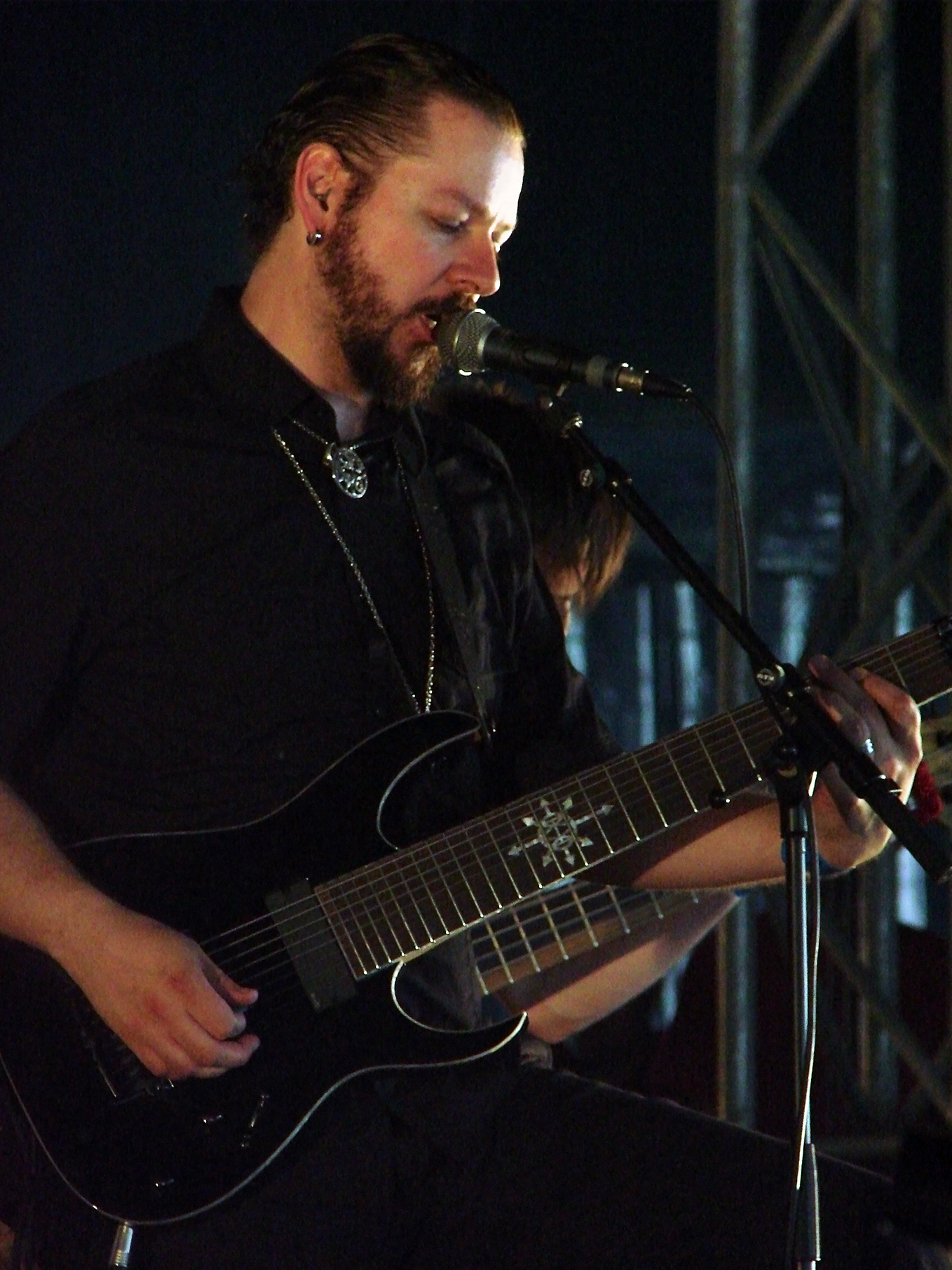

Background information
- Origin: Notodden, Norway
- Genres: Progressive metal; avant-garde metal
- Years active: 1998–2006
- Labels: Mnemosyne Productions; The End Records; Candlelight Records

Peccatum was a heavy metal band from Norway. Their influences range from black metal, progressive metal, industrial music, symphonic metal and gothic metal to European classical music and contemporary music.

== History ==
Singer Ihriel (Heidi Solberg Tveitan), her husband Ihsahn of Emperor, and her brother Lord PZ formed Peccatum. The group released three albums and two EPs. Lost in Reverie, released in 2004 after PZ's departure, followed a classical, avant-garde, opaque direction.

Mnemosyne Productions, which Ihriel and Ihsahn own and operate, released Lost in Reverie and the 2005 EP The Moribund People.

On 4 March 2006 Peccatum split. Ihriel continued with Starofash and Ihsahn worked on his solo project.

== Discography ==
=== Studio releases ===
- Strangling from Within – (1999)
- Oh, My Regrets (EP) – (2000)
- Amor Fati – (2000)
- Lost in Reverie – (2004)
- The Moribund People (EP) – (2005)
