= Ihsahn =

Norwegian multi-instrumentalist, vocalist and composer

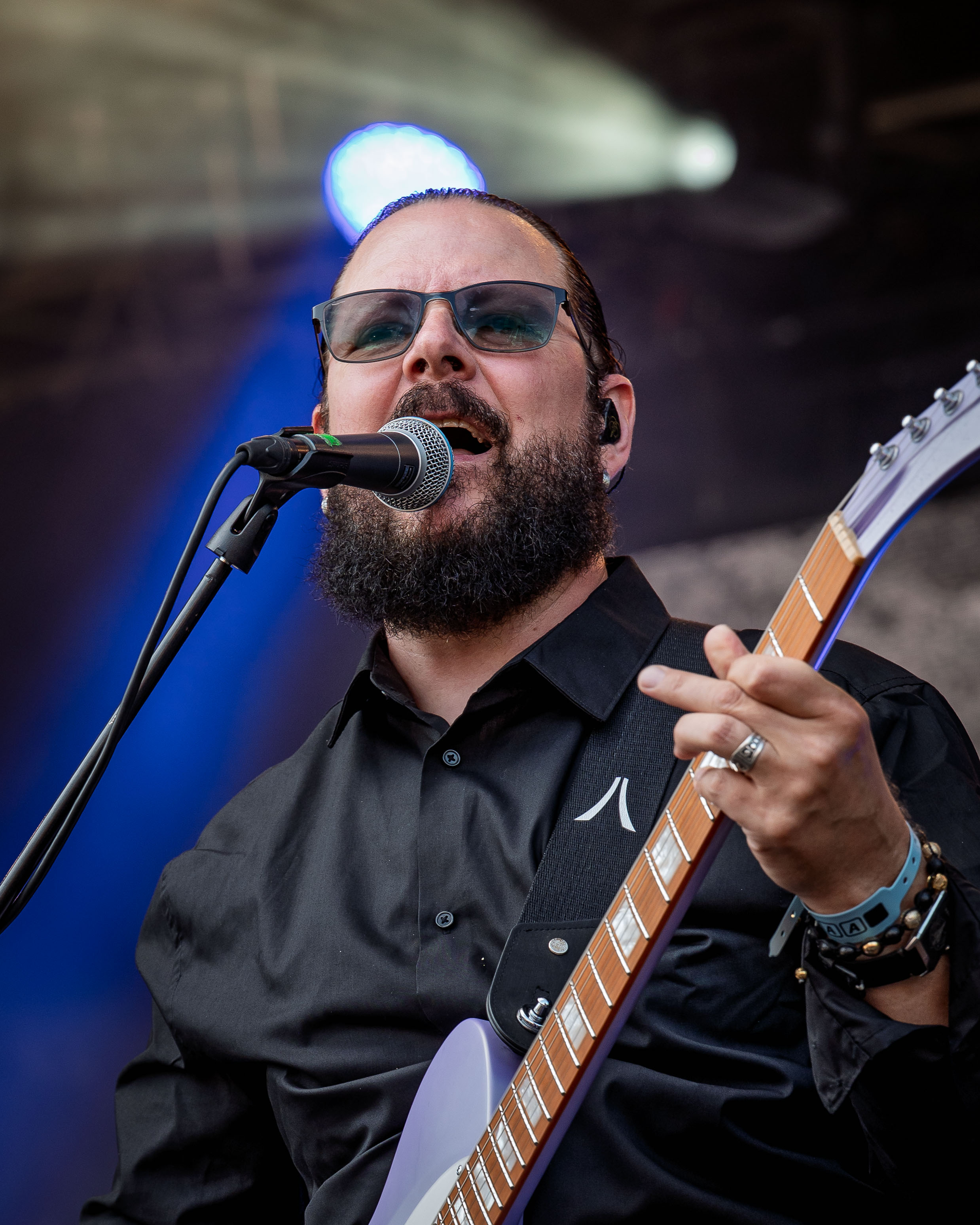
- Ihsahn performing with Emperor at Tons of Rock, 2025

Background information
- Born: Vegard Sverre Tveitan; 10 October 1975 (age 50); Notodden, Norway
- Genres: Black metal; symphonic black metal; avant-garde metal; progressive metal; progressive rock
- Occupations: Musician; singer; songwriter; composer; producer
- Instruments: Guitar; vocals; piano; keyboards; synthesizer; bass; drums
- Years active: 1990–present
- Labels: Candlelight; Mnemosyne; Century Media
- Member of: Emperor
- Formerly of: Thou Shalt Suffer; Peccatum; Zyklon-B; Ildjarn
- Website: ihsahn.com

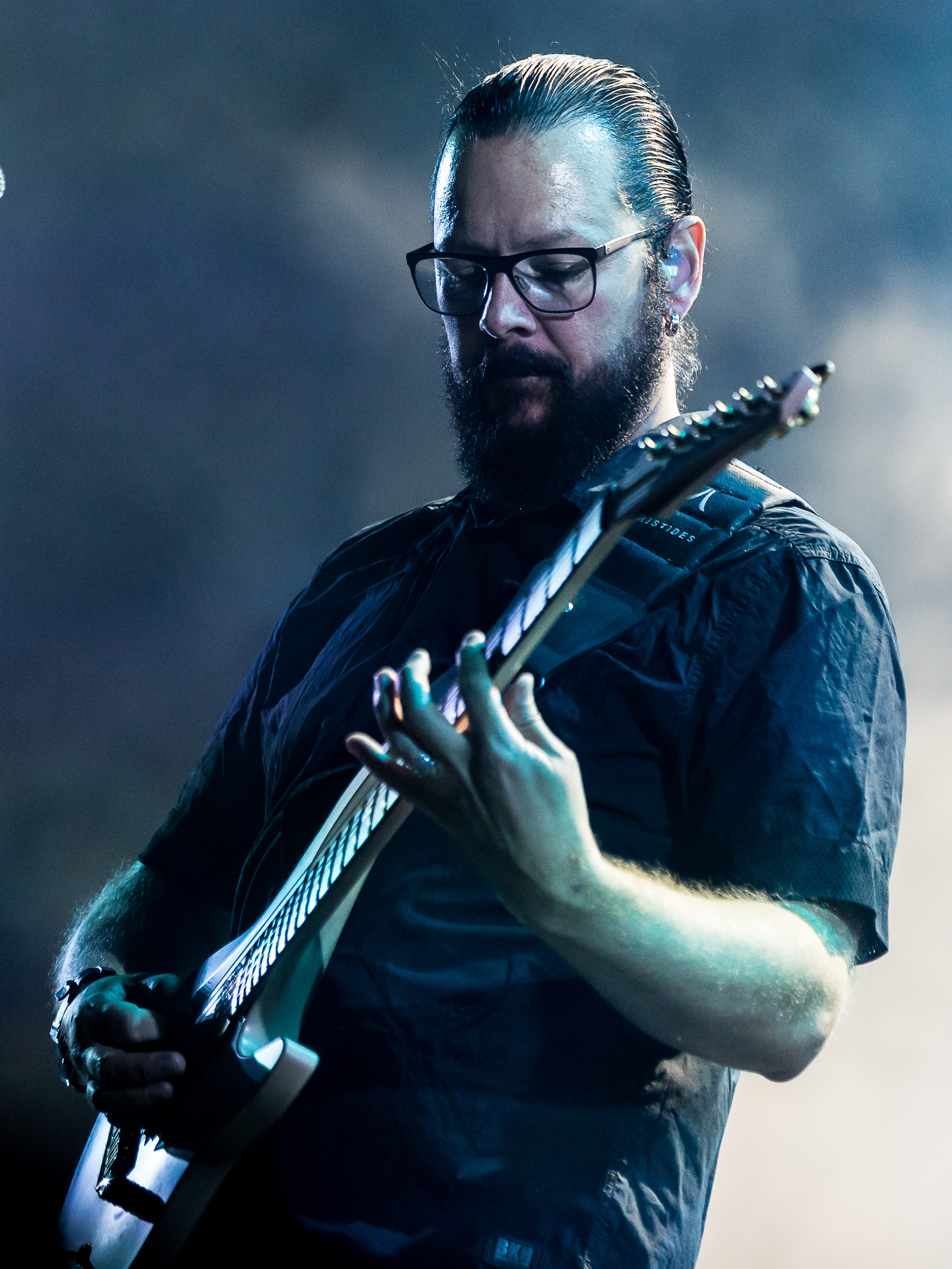
Ihsahn performing at Party.San Metal Open Air 2018

Vegard Sverre Tveitan (born 10 October 1975), better known by his stage name Ihsahn (/ˈiʃɑːn/ ee-SHAHN), is a Norwegian musician, singer, songwriter, record producer, and composer known for his work with black metal band Emperor. Tveitan is a founding member of Thou Shalt Suffer, where he played guitar and keyboard and sang, and Peccatum, a collaboration with wife and musician Heidi Solberg Tveitan, known as Starofash. Since 2006, Tveitan has focused on solo albums and occasional guest appearances.

Beyond metal music, Tveitan's style includes classical, industrial, and progressive elements. He is a progenitor of symphonic black metal.

== Biography ==
Tveitan was born in Notodden, Norway. He grew up on a farm. He began playing piano at age six and guitar at age 10.

=== Early years: Xerasia, Embryonic, and Thou Shalt Suffer ===
At age 13, Tveitan met Tomas Haugen (also known as Samoth), who became his collaborator and co-founder of Emperor. While at a music seminar, Tveitan gained Haugen's attention with his Iron Maiden patches.

In 1990, Tveitan joined Haugen's band Xerasia, a death metal band in which he played guitar and keyboards. They changed their name to Embryonic sometime that year. In November, the band released the self-financed four-track demo The Land of the Lost Souls. In 1991, they changed their name again to Thou Shalt Suffer. The project was partially funded by a government grant, and the group made several releases in 1990 and 1991. Shortly after, Haugen left to focus on other projects. Tveitan later released the album of electronic music Somnium under the name Thou Shalt Suffer.

=== Formation of Emperor and Peccatum ===
Later in 1991, Haugen and Tveitan formed Emperor, which had a more refined black metal sound that showcased Tveitan's keyboard skills, a feature that would appear in many later releases. Black metal musician Euronymous supported and encouraged the band. After several demos, the Emperor EP was released in 1993 to acclaim.

During this time, bandmates Bård Eithun (known as Faust) and Haugen were imprisoned for murder and arson, respectively. Tveitan retreated to a family property to compose Anthems to the Welkin at Dusk, recorded after Haugen's parole.

In 1995, Zyklon-B released Blood Must be Shed, featuring members of Emperor and Satyricon. Tveitan played synth on the album. In 1998, Tveitan and wife Heidi Solberg Tveitan—who used the stage name Ihriel—formed the experimental band Peccatum. Tveitan played synth and sang clean and black vocals. Peccatum became his main project until it disbanded on 4 March 2006.

In 1999, Emperor released IX Equilibrium, Tveitan's third studio album with the group. Two years later, in 2001, Peccatum released their second studio album, Amor Fati. That year, Emperor released their fourth and final studio album, Prometheus: The Discipline of Fire & Demise, entirely composed by Tveitan and featuring complex orchestration and fewer synthesizers than before. At this time, Emperor dissolved, leaving Tveitan and his bandmates with more time to focus on side projects.

Peccatum released their third and final studio album, Lost in Reverie, in 2004. The EP The Moribund People followed the year after. On 30 September 2005, Emperor surprise-returned at Scream magazine's 15-year anniversary party at Rockefeller Music Hall in Oslo. The three-song show was kept secret. They announced a few reunion shows around Europe and America in 2006, at Wacken and Inferno Festival.

=== Solo albums ===
==== 2006–2010: The Adversary, angL, and After ====
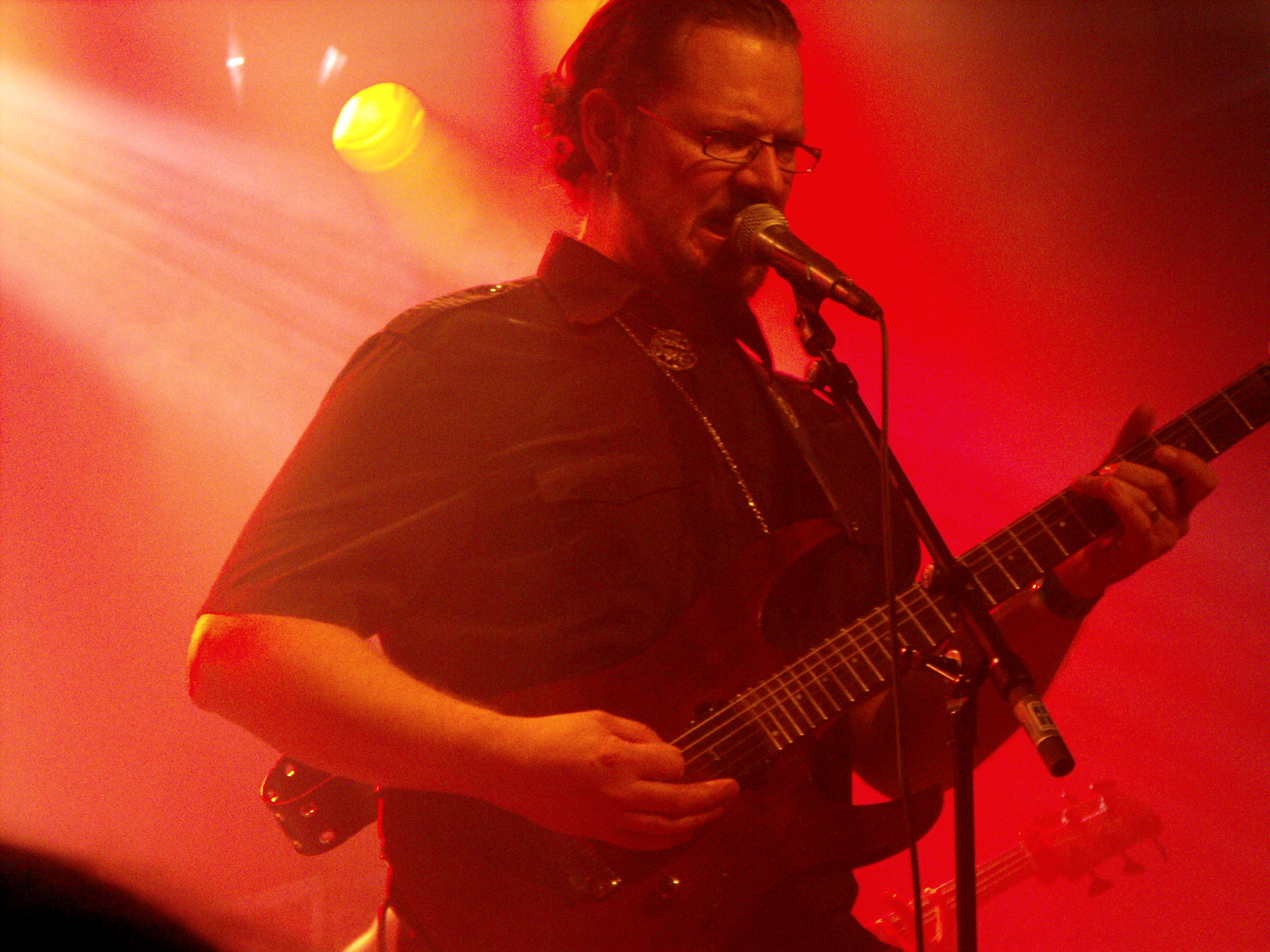
Ihsahn performing at Hole in the Sky 2010

In April 2006, Tveitan released his first solo album, The Adversary. He self-recorded and self-produced the album except for drums, contributed by Asgeir Mickelson, and guest vocals on the track "Homecoming" by Kristoffer Rygg of Ulver. The album showcases progressive influences and heavy metal, black metal and classical music. The Adversary was recorded at Symphonique Studios in Norway and released on his label, Mnemosyne Productions, which he founded in 2003 with Starofash. A video was made for opening track "Invocation".

He released his second studio album, angL, the following year, featuring bassist Lars K. Norberg, drummer Asgeir Mickelson, and guest vocalist Mikael Åkerfeldt of Opeth on "Unhealer".

In March 2009, Tveitan performed solo material live for the first time, in a one-off performance opening for Opeth in Norway. He has since made festival appearances playing solo material and Emperor covers. Leprous served as his backing band. Grimen, the only album by side project 'Hardingrock', was released that year.

Tveitan released his third solo album, After, in January 2010. Nordberg and Mickelson played bass and drums, respectively, with Jørgen Munkeby of Shining playing saxophone on several tracks. Later that year, in October, a Mnemosyne web update confirmed that Ihsahn had begun writing a fourth solo album, and was focusing on upgrading his home studio.

==== 2011–2013: Eremita and Das Seelenbrechen ====
Aside from making his solo debut in the US at ProgPower USA in Atlanta, Georgia, in 2011, he guested on two records, co-produced the album Bilateral with his wife, and continued work on his fourth album with Jørgen Munkeby and Devin Townsend, who, in a November 2011 interview, mentioned that he was "singing a song for Ihsahn's new thing" but could not elaborate at that point.

In 2012, Tveitan released his fourth studio album, Eremita.

Das Seelenbrechen was released on 21 October 2013, recorded in Juke Joint Studio and Tveitan's Mnemosyne Studio.

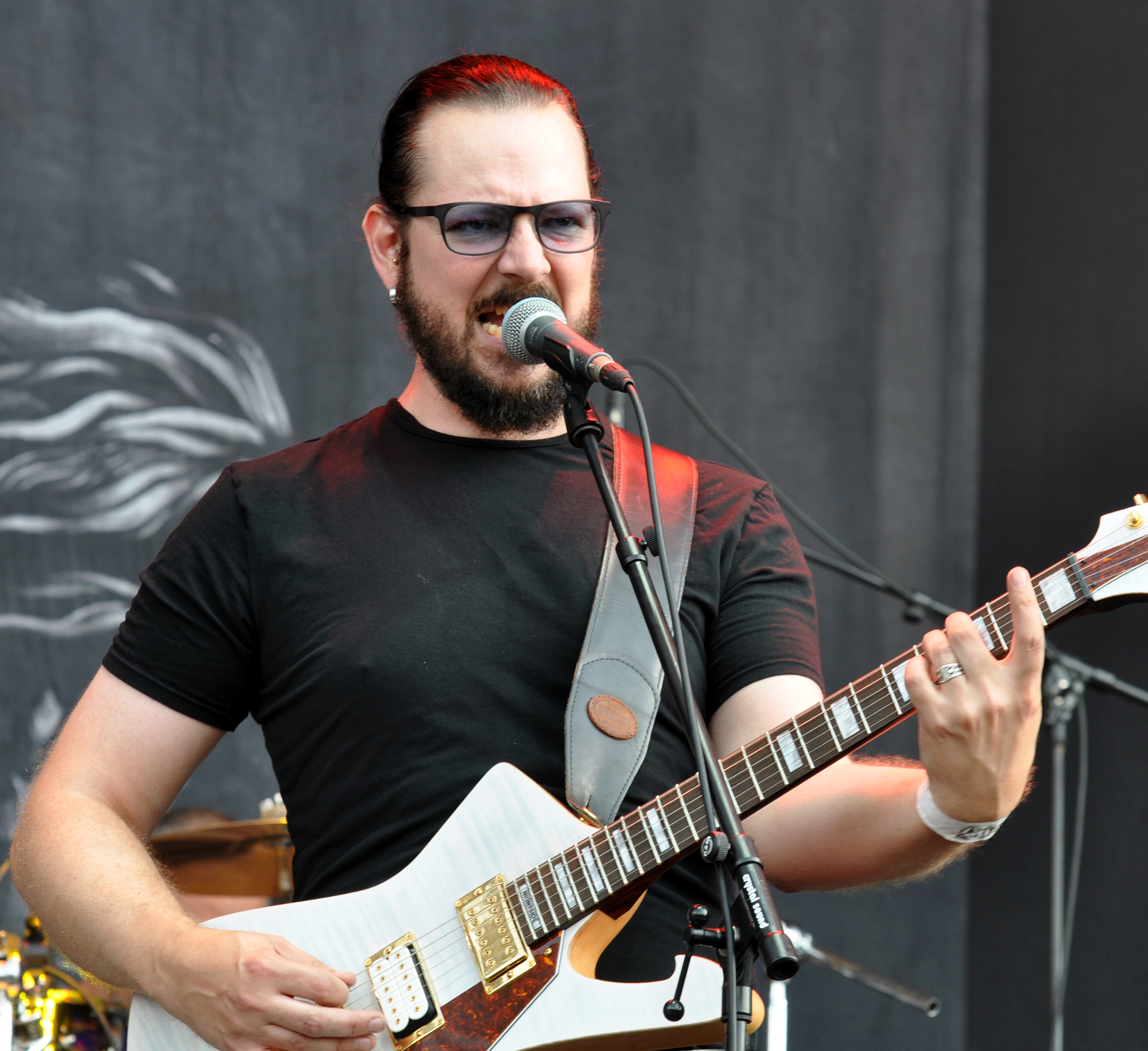
Ihsahn at Wacken Open Air 2014

==== 2016–present: Arktis, Àmr, and self-titled eighth album ====
In April 2016, Tveitan released Arktis on Candlelight Records, mixed and mastered by Jens Bogren. The album cover features a photograph of Fridtjof Nansen, whose 1896 North Pole mission fits the album's concept. They share their 10 October birthday.

In 2018, Tveitan released Ámr, his seventh album. The title is an old Norse word for "loathsome" or "black", and reflects the introspective songs. Tveitan added that the word Àmr could also mean "rust red", and that the concept of a "room without walls" was prevalent when working on the album. Compared to previous albums, Àmr features more electronic sounds, including analog synthesizers that add to the intimate feeling. In November 2023, Tveitan announced that his self-titled eighth album would be released on 16 February 2024. In addition to the traditional album version, the album includes an orchestral version. At the same time, the first single from the album, "Pilgrimage to Oblivion", was released.

== Awards and publications ==
In 2002, Tveitan was awarded the Notodden kommunes kulturpris (Notodden Municipality's Culture prize). He won the prize because he is considered the best-known inhabitant of Notodden, a great musician, a music teacher, and he arranges a lot of concerts for unknown bands. The fact that his band sold more than 500,000 copies was also a reason for getting the prize.

Tveitan has instructional videos on playing guitar that have appeared in online publications such as Guitar World.

Tveitan's third solo album, After, was nominated for a Norwegian Grammy, a Spellemannprisen.

Tveitan lent his voice in 2007 to an animated character from the Adult Swim cartoon Metalocalypse, Eric von Wiechlinghammer, in the episode "Dethfashion".

== Musical style and influences ==
In an interview in 2012, Tveitan cited Iron Maiden, King Diamond, Judas Priest, and Pink Floyd as influential artists when he was young. He highlighted the conceptual and narrative aspects that these groups constructed their albums around as being particularly influential. His solo albums also strive to maintain a cohesive thread throughout. Tveitan has described planning the atmosphere and conceptual underpinnings of Arktis and Àmr before beginning the compositional process, and has rejected the idea that albums are mere collections of songs.

== Personal life ==
Ihsahn is married to Heidi Solberg Tveitan, known professionally as Starofash or Ihriel. He has cited her as an important creative collaborator on his solo albums. Ihsahn is the brother-in-law of Einar Solberg, the lead vocalist of the band Leprous, Kenneth Solberg, former guitarist of the band Leprous, and Lord PZ, who was a part of the band Peccatum together with both Ihsahn and his wife.

Ihsahn has a son named Angell Solberg Tveitan. He appears on the album Ámr on track 5.

=== Beliefs ===
Ihsahn described himself a Satanist in the 1990s, when he was 18 years old and mainly known as the Emperor guitarist. As he explained in 1994, he considered Satanism to be hard to define, as there are different ways of Satanism, and to be more of a category the individual would have to set for themselves. He considered most other adolescents to be "soulless" people, too involved in materialistic things. He said the imprisonment of the other Emperor members had both positive and negative effects; it meant a difficult period for the band, but the imprisonment also gave them publicity and therefore more possibilities to spread their ideas. Ihsahn additionally has said he has seen no reason to be physically destructive and has had no personal connection to the church burning cases that rocked Norway. In a 1994 interview, Ihsahn described a social Darwinist influence on his Satanism, calling himself anti-Christian and saying it is "not for a weak person", while also expressing respect towards European paganism, meditation and stewardship of the environment. He has additionally condemned acts of criminality and other forms of religious intolerance such as the aforementioned arson cases.

== Band ==
Current

- Ihsahn – guitars, bass, vocals, keyboards (2005–present)

Session studio musicians

- Asgeir Mickelson – drums (2006, 2008, 2010)
- Tobias Ørnes Andersen – drums (2012, 2013, 2016, 2018, 2024)
- Lars K. Norberg – bass (2008, 2010)
- Jørgen Munkeby – saxophone (2010, 2012, 2016)

Live musicians (flexible lineup)

- Tobias Ørnes Andersen – drums (2010–present)
- Tobias Solbakk – drums (2018–present)
- Øystein Landsverk – guitars, backing vocals (2010–present)
- Eirik Kråkenes – guitars, backing vocals (2018–present)
- Nicolay Tangen Svennæs – keyboards, backing vocals (2015–present)
- Øystein Heide Aadland – keyboards, backing vocals (2016–present)
- Robin Ognedal – guitars (2015–2017)
- Tor Oddmund Suhrke – guitars, backing vocals (2010–2014)
- Einar Solberg – keyboards, backing vocals (2010–2014)
- Martin Skrebergene – bass (2013–2014)
- Baard Kolstad – drums (2013–2014)
- Rein T. Blomquist – bass (2011–2013)
- Halvor Strand – bass (2009–2011)

== Discography ==
=== Studio albums ===
Title	Album details	Peak chart positions		Sales
Title	Album details	NOR	US Heat	Sales
The Adversary	Released: 10 April 2006; Label: Mnemosyne, Candlelight; Formats: CD, LP, digital download	33	—	
angL	Released: 26 May 2008; Label: Mnemosyne, Candlelight; Formats: CD, LP, digital download	—	—	
After	Released: 26 January 2010; Label: Mnemosyne, Candlelight; Formats: CD, CD+DVD, LP, digital download	38	31	US: 1,350+
Eremita	Released: 18 June 2012; Label: Mnemosyne, Candlelight; Formats: CD, LP, digital download	—	34	US: 900+
Das Seelenbrechen	Released: 21 October 2013; Label: Mnemosyne, Candlelight; Formats: CD, LP, digital download	—	—	US: 720+
Arktis	Released: 22 April 2016; Label: Candlelight; Formats: CD, LP, digital download	—	13	
Ámr	Released: 4 May 2018; Label: Candlelight; Formats: CD, LP, digital download	—	6	
Ihsahn	Released: 16 February 2024; Label: Candlelight; Formats: CD, LP, digital download	—	—	
"—" denotes a release that did not chart.

=== EPs ===
- Telemark (2020)
- Pharos (2020)
- Fascination Street Sessions (2023)

=== Peccatum ===
- Strangling from Within – (1999)
- Oh, My Regrets (EP) – (2000)
- Amor Fati – (2000)
- Lost in Reverie – (2004)
- The Moribund People (EP) – (2005)

=== Guest appearances and session contributions ===
Year	Album	Notes
1995	Ildjarn – Det Frysende Nordariket	session vocals on various tracks
1995	Sigurd Wongraven – Fjelltronen	session synth
1995	Zyklon-B – Blood Must Be Shed	session synth and guitar
1998	Ulver – Themes from William Blake's The Marriage of Heaven and Hell	guest vocals on "A Song of Liberty"
2002	Arcturus – The Sham Mirrors	guest vocals on "Radical Cut"
2002	Starofash – Iter.Viator	various roles including guitar and bass duties
2010	Starofash – Lakhesis	additional guitars
2011	Devin Townsend – Deconstruction	guest vocals on "Juular"
2011	Leprous – Bilateral	guest vocals on "Thorn"
2012	Jeff Loomis – Plains of Oblivion	guest vocals on "Surrender"
2013	Leprous – Coal	string arrangement on "Chronic", guest vocals on "Contaminate Me"
2015	Trivium – Silence in the Snow	writer of "Snøfall"
2021	Trivium – In the Court of the Dragon	programming, arranging, instrumentation, orchestration, writer of "X"
2022	Ibaraki – Rashomon	arranging, instrumentation, orchestration, guest vocals
