= Inferno Metal Festival =

Annual music festival in Oslo, Norway

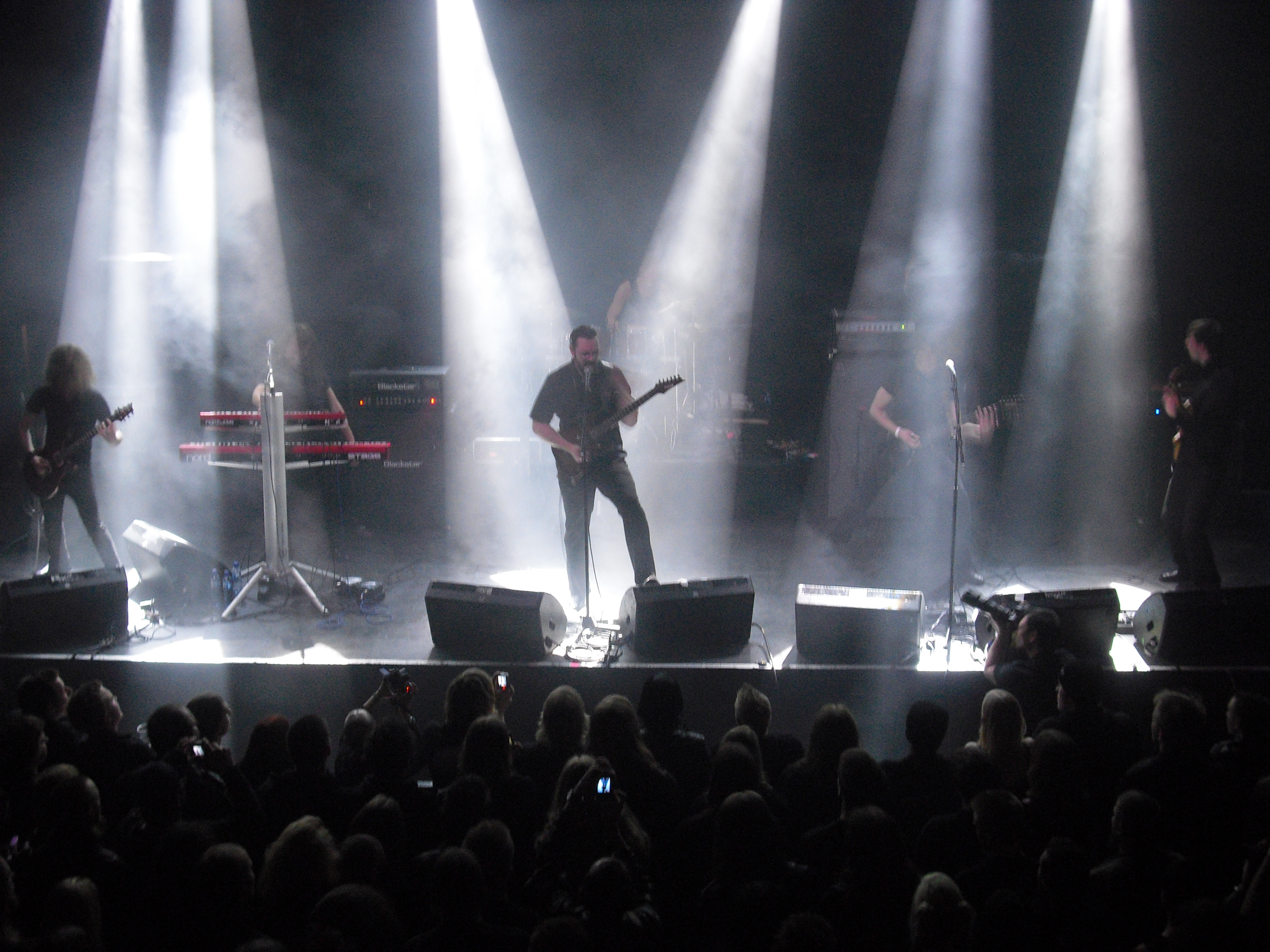
- Genre: Heavy metal
- Dates: Easter
- Locations: Oslo, Norway
- Coordinates: 59°54′58″N 10°45′03″E
- Years active: 2001–present
- Website: infernofestival.net

Inferno Metal Festival (usually referred to simply as Inferno or the Inferno Festival) is an annual extreme metal festival that takes place every year during Easter in Oslo, Norway. The festival was founded by Borknagar guitarist Jens F. Ryland in cooperation with Jan-Martin Jensen of Radar Booking in 2001.

Concerts are mainly held at Rockefeller Music Hall plus its basement venue John Dee. The early evening programme is scattered around smaller venues nearby: Kniven, Goldie, Vaterland, Dattera til Hagen, amongst others.

Like the Beyond The Gates festival in Bergen, the Inferno Festival offers a “fringe program” where concertgoers are provided with daytime activities. One example is Black Metal Bus Sightseeing, a guided tour with Anders Odden to locations of historical interest for metal fans, including the record store Helvete. 60 percent of Inferno's festival tickets are sold abroad, attracting audiences from over 50 countries. The fringe program has therefore received funding from the Research Council of Norway, which is also studying the ripple effects for the regions hosting the two festivals.

== Inferno Music Conference (IMC) ==
Parallel to the festival, the Inferno Music Conference (IMC) takes place, with hundreds of delegates including international festival bookers, agents, press, and PR companies. The conference was first held in 2006. In 2024, nearly 300 delegates from 36 countries participated in panel debates and Q&A sessions, making it the largest metal conference in the world.

The conference is organized in cooperation with partners such as Fritt Ord, the international news portal Metal Injection, Creo – the Union for Art and Culture, Music Norway, BandOrg, AKKS, RadiOrakel, the Ministry of Foreign Affairs, and Indie Recordings. Previous partners have included Innovation Norway and the US Embassy.

=== Inferno tattoo fair & art exhibition ===
As part of IMC, a tattoo fair and an art exhibition are organized, including sales booths for the artists. The exhibition takes place at the festival hotel, while the tattoo fair is located at the main venue, Rockefeller.

== Lineups ==
=== 2026 ===
The 2026 edition took place at Rockefeller Music Hall from 2 to 5 April.

Deicide, Mayhem, Cult of Luna, Enslaved, Tormentor, The Kovenant, Kanonenfieber, Old Man’s Child, Incantation, Der Weg einer Freiheit, Samael, Primordial, Svarttjern, Mùr, Whoredom Rife, Auðn, 1914, Funeral, Darvaza, Mork, Carnivore A.D., Groza, Sadistic Intent, Firespawn, Hulder, Morax, Bizarrekult, Nite, Myr, Nihilvm, Hierophant, Perchta, Forsman, Sovereign, Angell, Abhorration.

=== 2025 ===
The 2025 edition took place at Rockefeller Music Hall from 17 to 20 April, featuring the highest number of artists in the festival's history. This was also the first festival held without founder, festival director, and head booker Jan-Martin Jensen, who died from cancer in February of the same year. A number of tributes were made in Jensen's honor during concerts and other events, and he was awarded the Bylarmer of the Year prize shortly before his death.

Behemoth, Satyricon, Abbath, 1349, Rotting Christ, Septicflesh, Batushka, Tsjuder, Tiamat, Kylesa, Aura Noir, Naglfar, Blood Incantation, Necrophobic, Cadaver, Schammasch, Gaera, Dødheimsgaard, Coven, Celeste, Minami Deutsch, In the woods..., Seth, Spectral Wound, Aeternus, Negative Plane, Sibiir, Non Est Deus, John Cxnnor, Lamentari, Kirkebrann, Violent Magic Orchestra, Bismarck, Abyssic, Bythos, Syn, Attan, Vorbid.

=== 2023 ===
The 2023 edition took place at Rockefeller Music Hall from 6 to 9 April.

Emperor, Amorphis, Watain, Cannibal Corpse, Abbath, Dark Funeral, Unleashed, Nile, Elder, Arcturus, Crowbar, Godflesh, Wolves in the Throne Room, Uada, Odium, Sakis Tolis, Harakiri for the Sky, Urgehal, Vemod, Djevel, Nekromantheon, Mork

=== 2022 ===
The 2022 edition replaced the 2020 edition, cancelled because of the COVID-19 pandemic. It took place at Rockefeller Music Hall from 14 to 17 April. The festival tried to keep the same lineup as for the 2020 cancelled edition. The announced lineup was:

Mayhem, Venom, Kreator, Triumph of Death, Gorgoroth, Marduk, Ihsahn, Kampfar, Asphyx, Bölzer, Vreid, Cadaver, Dark Fortress, Einherjer, Djerv, Asagraum, Oranssi Pazuzu, Myrkskog, Benighted, Sovereign, Tulus, Valkyrja, Ved Buens Ende, Hamferð, Entombed A.D., From the Vastland, Zifir, Isvind

=== 2020 ===
The 2020 edition was planned to place at Rockefeller Music Hall in April 2020, but was cancelled and rescheduled to April 2022 because of the COVID-19 pandemic.

=== 2019 ===
The 2019 edition took place at Rockefeller Music Hall from 18. to 21. April.

Taake, 1349, Vomitory, Gaahls Wyrd, Hypocrisy, Carach Angren, Tribulation, Misþyrming, Archgoat, The Ruins of Beverast, Der Weg einer Freiheit, The Black Dahlia Murder, Avast, Acârash, Impaled Nazarene, Mgła, Dimmu Borgir, Ragnarok, Svarttjern, Aura Noir, Witchcraft, Bloodbath, Opeth and Dvne

=== 2018 ===
The 2018 edition took place at Rockefeller Music Hall from 29. March, to 1. April.

Shining, Dark Funeral, Obituary, Origin, Emperor, Fleshgod Apocalypse, Ihsahn, Satyricon, Necrophobic, Ahab, Djevel, Tsjuder, Napalm Death, Electric Wizard, Carpathian Forest, Grave, Memoriam

=== 2017 ===
The 2017 edition took place at Rockefeller Music Hall from 12. April (club night) Vulcan Arena, to 15. April. Among the bands on the line-up were:

Abbath, Befouled, Carcass, Gorgoroth, Destruction, Samael, Belphegor, Borknagar, Primordial, Red Harvest, Tangorodrim, Anaal Nathrakh, Slagmaur, Crowbar, Furze

=== 2016 ===
The 2016 edition took place at Rockefeller Music Hall from 23. April (club night), to 26. April.

Mayhem, Nile, Marduk, Exodus, Sodom, Vader, Nifelheim, ICS Vortex, Blood Red Throne, Order, Gorguts, Craft, The 3rd Attempt, Mistur, Thaw, Psycroptic, Lucifer's Child, Orkan, Mork, Scarred, Abbysion, Stahlsarg

=== 2015 ===
The 2015 edition took place at Rockefeller Music Hall from 1. April (club night), to 4. April. Headliners were:

1349, ADE, Arcturus, Behemoth, Bloodbath, Crescent, Enslaved, Kampfar, My Dying Bride, Septicflesh, Taake

=== 2014 ===
The 2014 edition took place at Rockefeller Music Hall from 16. April (club night), to 19. April.

=== 2013 ===
The 2013 edition took place at Rockefeller Music Hall from 27. March (club night), to 30. March.

=== 2012 ===
The 2012 edition took place at Rockefeller Music Hall from 4. April (club night), to the 7. April.

=== 2011 ===
The 2011 edition took place at Rockefeller Music Hall from April 20 (club night), to April 23.

=== 2010 ===
The 2010 edition took place at Rockefeller Music Hall from March 31 (club night), to April 3.

Nifrost, Svarttjern, Demonic Resurrection, Spearhead (in replacement for The Psyke Project), Nachtmystium, Madder Mortem, Eyehategod, Belphegor, Finntroll, Marduk, Throne of Katarsis, Fortid, Blodspor, Obscura, Ragnarok, Mistur, Ram-Zet, Benediction, Ihsahnm Mayhem, Como Muertos, Sarkom, Irr, Exumer, Necrophagist, Årabrot, Taake, Deströyer 666, The Kovenant, Death Angel

=== 2009 ===
The 2009 edition took place at Rockefeller Music Hall from April 8 (club night), to April 11.

- Carpathian Forest
- Keep of Kalessin
- Vreid
- Paradise Lost
- Negură Bunget
- Samael
- Septic Flesh
- Pestilence
- Pantheon I
- Helheim
- Kampfar
- Koldbrann
- Swallow the Sun
- Dew-Scented
- Troll
- Code
- Root
- Black Comedy
- Vicious Art
- Grand Magus
- Execration
- Ramesses
- Unearthly Trance
- Taetre
- Azarath
- Kraanium
- Episode 13
- Seregon
- The Battalion, in replacement for Meshuggah
- Krypt
- Sahg
- Sarke
- Mencea
- Warlord UK

=== 2008 ===
- 1349
- Gaahl and King ov Hell (under the name Gorgoroth)
- Unleashed
- Satyricon
- Keep of Kalessin
- Behemoth
- Gallhammer
- Destruction
- Krux
- Shining
- Tulus
- Tristania
- Cult of Luna
- Overkill
- Skitliv
- Krux
- Obliteration
- Gorefest
- Onslaught
- The Battalion
- Dead to This World
- Mortal Sin
- Diskord
- Negură Bunget
- Vreid
- Desecration

=== 2007 ===
The 2007 edition took place at Rockefeller Music Hall on April 5, April 6 and April 7.

- Norwegian Metal All-Stars
- Trinacria
- Primordial
- Zyklon
- Suffocation
- Fatal Demeanor
- Karkadan
- Unspoken
- Paradigma
- Watain
- Red Harvest (After Sabbat cancelled)
- God Dethroned
- Sigh
- Moonspell
- Immortal
- Ravencult
- Ground Zero System
- Rotten Sound
- Legion of the Damned
- Hecate Enthroned
- Brutal Truth
- Dødheimsgard
- Dark Funeral
- Tiamat
- Sodom
- Lobotomized
- Resurrected
- Blood Tsunami
- Koldbrann
- Anaal Nathrakh

==== Kick-off party ====
- Allfader
- Olm

=== 2006 ===
The 2006 edition took place at Rockefeller Music Hall and John Dee from the 13th to the 15th of April.

- Battered
- Bloodthorn
- Bolt Thrower
- Borknagar
- Carpathian Forest
- Cathedral
- Demonizer
- Disiplin
- Dismember
- Emperor
- Endstille
- Face Down
- Funeral
- Imbalance
- Keep of Kalessin
- Khold
- Legion
- Manngard
- Marduk
- Myrkskog
- Nightrage
- Rimfrost
- Sahg
- Susperia
- System:Obscure
- The Deviant
- Usurper
- Vesen
- Waklevören
- Witchcraft

=== 2005 ===
- Amon Amarth
- Arcturus
- Aura Noir
- Candlemass
- Chton
- Deceiver
- Dissection
- Gehenna
- Grave
- Green Carnation
- Grimfist
- Goatlord
- Gorelord
- Hatesphere
- Horricane
- Lamented Souls
- Morbid Angel
- Mortiis
- Nebular Mystic
- Naer mataron
- Obliteration
- Seth
- She Said Destroy
- Slogstorm
- Sunn O)))
- Tsjuder
- Taakeferd
- Vreid
- Zeenon

=== 2004 ===
- Aborym
- Aeternus
- Asmegin
- Decapitated
- Defiled
- Dimension F3h
- Disiplin
- Enslaved
- Forgery
- Gorgoroth
- Helheim
- Holy Moses
- Khold
- Konkhra
- Manes
- Manifest
- Mayhem
- Maze of Torment
- Mercenary
- MindGrinder
- My Dying Bride
- Myrkskog
- Pawnshop
- Rotting Christ
- Sadus
- Sinners Bleed
- Susperia
- Tonka

=== 2003 ===
- 1349
- Alsvartr
- Audiopain
- Belphegor
- Cadaver
- Children of Bodom
- Deride
- Entombed
- Exmortem
- Grand Alchemist
- Immortal
- Koldbrann
- Lost at Last
- Lumsk
- Madder Mortem
- N.C.O.
- Necrophagia
- Opeth
- Perished
- Ragnarok
- Raise Hell
- Red Harvest
- Runemagick
- Shadows Fall
- Thyruz
- Sirenia
- Soilwork
- The Allseeing I
- The Kovenant
- Taake
- Vader

=== 2002 ===
- 1349
- Aeternus
- Agressor
- Behemoth
- Black Comedy
- Blood Red Throne
- Carpathian Forest
- Dimmu Borgir
- Eternal Silence
- Lock Up
- Lost in Time
- Lowdown
- Manatark
- Minas Tirith
- Nocturnal Breed
- Scariot
- Source of Tide
- Vintersorg
- Windir
- Witchery
- Zection 8

=== 2001 ===
- Audiopain
- Bloodthorn
- Borknagar
- Burning Rubber
- Cadaver Inc.
- Crest of Darkness
- Cybele
- Enslaved
- Farout Fishing
- Gehenna
- Hades Almighty
- Khold
- M-Eternal
- Pain
- Peccatum
- Ram-Zet
- Red Harvest
- Susperia
- Tidfall
- Trail of Tears
- Witchery
- Zeenon
- Zyklon

== See also ==
- Beyond the Gates
- Hole in the Sky
- Midgardsblot
