= Blood Tsunami =

Norwegian thrash metal band

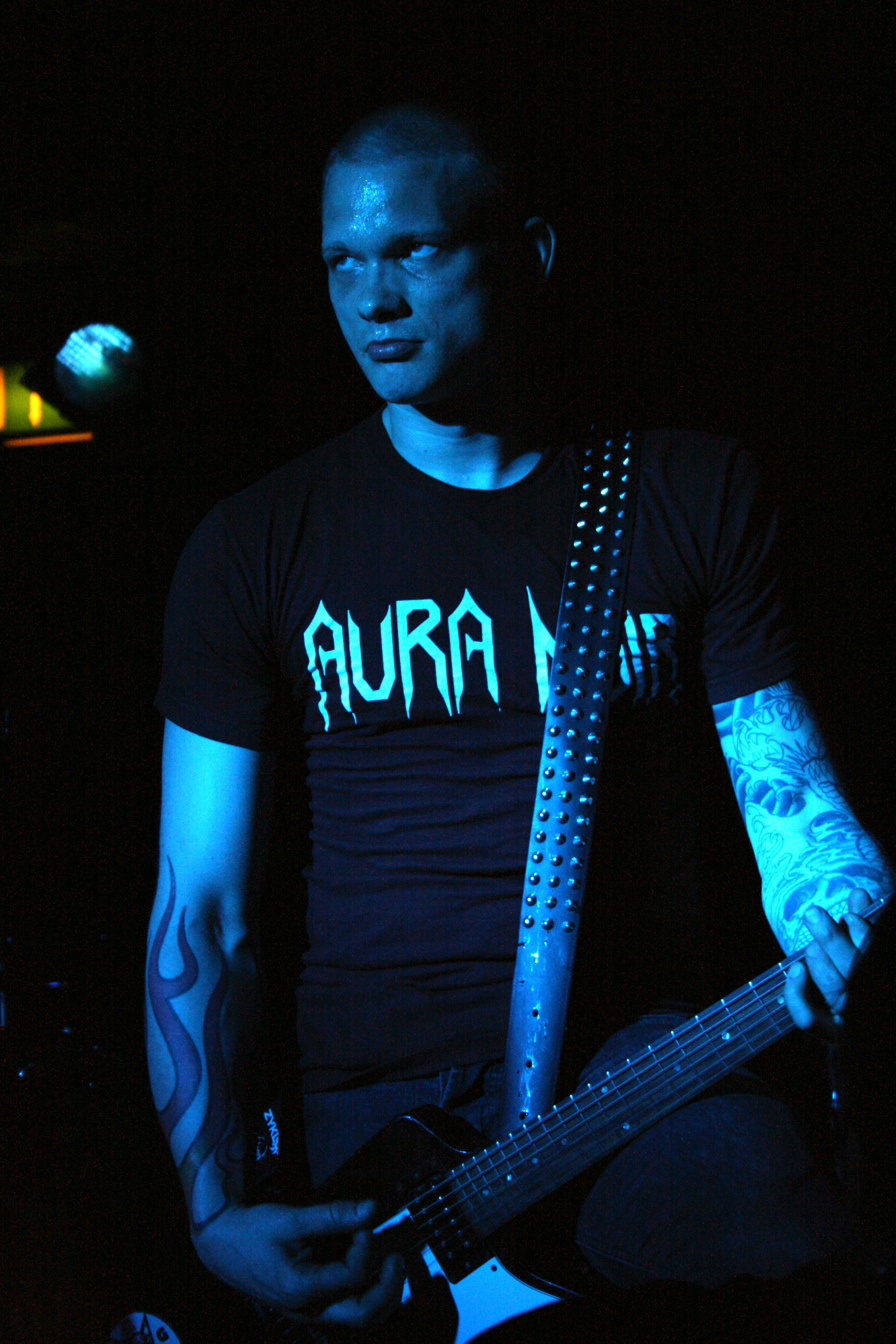
- Pete Evil during a concert in 2007

Background information
- Origin: Oslo, Norway
- Genre: Thrash metal
- Years active: 2004–present
- Label: Indie Recordings
- Members: Pete Evil; Dor Amazon; Faust; Calle (Carl Janfalk)
- Past members: Riff Randall; Stu Manx; Jørgen "Jay" Nordlie
- Website: bloodtsunami.com

Blood Tsunami is a Norwegian thrash metal band from Oslo, formed by Peter Michael Kolstad Vegem in 2004 and signed to Indie Recordings.

== Biography ==
=== 2003–2004 ===
Lead vocalist and lead guitarist Peter Michael Kolstad Vegem (a.k.a. Pete Evil) fronted punk/rock' roll band Hellride for several years. When this band broke up late in 2003, he formed a heavy metal band, for which he began to write material. In early January 2004, he formed Blood Tsunami.

Drummer Jørgen Nordli (a.k.a. Jay) joined and the two started rehearsing Vegem's material. The first Blood Tsunami song was "Killing Spree". Shortly after, Vegem found bass player Frode Sørskaar (a.k.a. Riff Randall). Kristoffer Sørensen (a.k.a. Dor Amazon) joined on lead guitar.

During the spring of 2004, this line up recorded a 4-song demo. Blood Tsunami's debut live performance took place on 24 August 2004, at a small club in Oslo called Last Train, supporting Swedish death metal band Entombed.

=== 2005–2007 ===
Sørskaar didn't feel comfortable playing metal. Vegem contacted former Hellride bandmate Peter Boström (a.k.a. Bosse). With Boström on bass, Blood Tsunami recorded another demo. During January 2005, they went to Fias Co Prod Studios and attempted to record the song "Evil Unleashed", but Nordli had problems behind the drumkit. Songs like "Evil Unleashed" and "Stabbed To Death" did not have the speed and intensity that Vegem wanted. Recording stopped and the band returned to rehearsing. Nordli was let go.

At this time, Vegem joined punk band Bomberos as bassist. Bomberos consisted of Bjørn Hinkel, Sven Erik Kristiansen (a.k.a. Maniac, ex Mayhem, Skitliv) and Einar Sursjø (a.k.a. Necrodevil of Infernö, Virus, Beyond Dawn etc. ). Vegem played one concert with this band. Necrodevil quit Bomberos and Hinkel hired a new drummer, whom Vegem was eager to recruit for Blood Tsunami.

Vegem gave Bård Eithun (a.k.a. Faust, ex- Emperor, Aborym, Scum) the Blood Tsunami demo from 2004 and asked to give it a try. Eithun agreed and shortly after became a permanent member of Blood Tsunami. Vegem and Eithun left Bomberos the next day.

The new Blood Tsunami line up recorded a five-song demo at Lion Heart Studios in Oslo with engineer Øyvind Voldmo Larsen. With Eithun on drums, old songs like "Killing Spree" had improved compared to the 2004 version. New songs on this demo included "Evil Unleashed", "Infernal Final Carnage", "Suicide Anthem", "Stabbed To Death" and a new version of "Let Blood Rain". Eithun had the technical skills and speed the band had been missing. Boström gave the band a new sound with his growling backing vocals. Boström provided clean vocals in the chorus of "Suicide Anthem". Vegem and Eithun were wary of bands who mixed aggressive vocals with clean vocals, but they allowed it because Boström's clean vocals complemented the song.

"Suicide Anthem" would not get an official release before it was included on the "Castle of Skulls" EP in 2009.

During 2006, Boström left the band. He was replaced with Stig Atle Amundsen (a.k.a. Stu Manx, ex-Gluecifer, ex-The Yum Yums). With a new bass player, the band started rehearsing old material instead of writing new songs. Amundsen preferred rock 'n roll and soon lost interest in Blood Tsunami. The band continued as a trio.

The 2005 demo secured Blood Tsunami a deal with Nocturnal Art Productions and Candlelight Recordings. The head of Nocturnal Art Productions, Tomas Haugen (a.k.a. Samoth), knew Eithun from when they were members of Norwegian black metal band Emperor. Haugen gave Blood Tsunami a chance, but stated, "This is not a favor for a friend. The music speaks for itself. If I didn't like the band I would have never signed them".

In 2006, when it was time to sign contracts, Vegem called Boström, who rejoined Blood Tsunami. The band entered Lion Heart studios with Øyvind Voldmo Larsen. "Killing Spree" was recorded for the third time in two years, and other demo songs like "Evil Unleashed", "Infernal Final Carnage" and "Stabbed To Death" made it onto the album. The latter was retitled "Torn Apart". The album's production was too polished for the band's taste. The band regretted this and wished they had paid more attention.

The ten-minuted instrumental track Godbeater" became a milestone in the band's career. The track resembled mid-1980s Metallica. The track came about when Vegem compiled old, unused riffs.

Vegem and Eithun wanted Blood Tsunami to have a strong, 1980s aesthetic. Vegem wanted something like Lawere's artwork for Kreator's "Pleasure To Kill", but Lawere could not be found. Ken Kelly never replied to mails, and Derek Riggs was too expensive. Vegem started looking through Marvel comics and found Alexander Orlandelli Horley. Horley's drawing were what Vegem was looking for, and he got in touch with the artist. Vegem explained what kind of cover he wanted. -"An evil warrior with a big scythe standing triumphant on top of a pile of mutilated corpses". Horley created the album cover. Vegem designed a new band logo.

Vegem suggested calling the album Thrash Metal. However, the music wasn't strictly "thrash" but contained death metal and rock 'n roll influences, and Vegem's vocals were too black metal for thrash. The band started reading reviews where the album title was constantly criticized. They understood that it had been a mistake to give the album a genre-binding title. Vegem stated, "We kinda "shot ourselves in the foot" with that title as we gave everyone a golden opportunity to criticize us for not being enough thrash metal. Instead of listening to a good metal album they only heard what was wrong with it... Too bad. I deeply regret not calling the album "Godbeater". That would have been a much better title and it would've given the album its own identity and saved us from all the slagging and nagging by reporters and metalheads who thought we were pissing all over the heritage of thrash metal."

Blood Tsunami's debut album, "Thrash Metal", was released by Nocturnal Art Productions and Candlelight Records on 19 March 2007. The album received good reviews and sold well. Blood Tsunami toured the UK tour with Zyklon and British death metal band Dead Beyond Buried.

=== 2008–2009 ===
The band continued to play shows, mostly in Norway but also a few abroad and they made quick "one off's" in Italy and Denmark. The band had problems with going on longer tours as both Pete and Faust had family commitments. They spent much time rehearsing and Pete had soon composed enough material for a second album. During the fall of 2008 Blood Tsunami entered Lion Heart Studios with Øyvind Voldmo Larsen for the third time inthree years and began working on the album that later would be known as "Grand Feast For Vultures", which was released by Nocturnal Art Productions and Candlelight Records on 27 April 2009. The album was praised by the metal communities of the world and received critical acclaim. Once again Alex Horley made the artwork and by suggestions from Pete he came up with a grotesque painting of a rotten corpse hanging in the middle of a battlefield. A big vulture is picking out his eye. The triumphant warrior from the debut was now replaced with by rotting corpse, but still the album displayed a much more confident band compared to the debut album. This time Blood Tsunami had focused on the whole production and came up with a sound that did the material justice.

As the lyrical content of "Thrash Metal" was all fictional stuff evolving around war, death and hell, "Grand Feast For Vultures" contained more personal lyrics. Pete had penned down his problems with alcohol and depression and all this was being screamed out in songs like "Personal Exorcism", "Laid To Waste" and "One Step Closer To The Grave". Lyrically, the opening track "Castle of Skulls" was more in the vein of the older material, but still if you read the lyrics they are written with a "us against them" theme and Pete later explained that the song was intended to be a battle cry for "Metalheads against Posers".

"Grand Feast for Vultures" also contained an instrumental. This instrumental was composed by Pete during 2008 and contained an impressive amount of riffs, harmonies and time signatures. The big difference compared to the previous instrumental "Godbeater" was the introduction of NWOBHM influences and the Iron Maiden-esque main themes. The new instrumental was first entitled "Enceladus Rising" and this title even made it on the first promotional copies that was shipped off to the US press and radio stations. This error explains why many Americans still calls this track for "Enceladus Rising". Before the actual booklet was being pressed Pete changed his mind and wanted the track to be called "Horsehead Nebula". Pete explained: "I wanted a title that both included something tremendously big and at the same time something very beautiful. Enceladus was one of the giants in Greek Mythology, but I reckon that he wasn't particularly beautiful. Enceladus is also the name given to one of the moons that goes in orbit around Saturn. That was more interesting and I started thinking about space... I digged up photos of various nebulas and in the back of my head I remembered a photos I had seen of this gigantic nebula with the shape of a horse head. I looked it up and the second I saw the photo I immediately knew I had the right title for the instrumental. The Horsehead Nebula is a dark nebula in the constellation Orion. It is located just to the south of the star Alnitak, which is farthest east on Orion's Belt, and is part of the much larger 'Orion molecular cloud complex'. The latter is of course bigger, but to use that as a title would have linked our instrumental up to Metallica's 'Orion' and it also sounds like something an industrial band would have called their album, so that option was quickly ditched."

Unfortunately, but for some unknown reason, Candlelight turned down Blood Tsunami's request for an economical advance so they could embark on an extensive European tour together with two American bands. Namely Absu and Nachtmystium. This set back compared with other booking problems made the band disgruntled and disappointed. The members and especially the driving force of Pete and Faust felt that they were working hard for little, or close to no reward. The once high spirits fell to an all-time low. Blood Tsunami played one show after the release of "Grand Feast For Vultures" and that show took place at Elm Street in Oslo in August 2009. Then Blood Tsunami disappeared.

=== 2009–2013 ===
During the summer of 2009, Pete had hooked up with his old friend Kristopher Schau (a.k.a. Max Cargo, ex- The Cumshots, Datsun, The Dogs, The Terrifieds). The two buddies used to play together in a punk band called Datsun in the late 1990s and Pete suggested: -"Hey, let's start up a band that doesn't care about genres. Let's do something like Zeke and The Dwarves and just play our balls off, get drunk and raise hell". Kristopher responded with a short "Yes" and they soon began to rehearse with Pete on guitar and Kristopher on vocals. The band was, for some stupid reason, called Mongo Ninja and both Faust and Dor became members of this band. The fifth member and bass player was Mads Martinsen. He works for an Oslo-based Booking Agency called Amber Booking. This connection resulted in a very busy touring schedule for the three Blood Tsunami guys. Once again Pete's creativity blossomed and within twelve months Mongo Ninja recorded and released three albums through the Oslo-based label, Indie Recordings. During this period Candlelight dropped Blood Tsunami and once again Bosse left the band. No one of the remaining Blood Tsunami members cared much about this as they were having a good time with Mongo Ninja.

After three years of touring and partying Pete began to miss Blood Tsunami. He felt that Mongo Ninja had accomplished what they set out to do and that the fun-part had slowly been replaced with duties and responsibilities. Faust, Dor and Pete began rehearsing some new material Pete had written and soon a few new Blood Tsunami songs emerged. The first songs to be ready was called "Metal Fang", "The Rape of Nanking" and "The Cruel Leading The Fool". The lyrical content had changes during the Mongo Ninja years as Pete incorporated his Mongo Ninja trademark of writing lyrics about real persons and true crimes. Now they had to find a new bass player.

Priscila Morales, (a.k.a. Proxy) a well known manager and booking agent in the Norwegian Metal scene, had gotten herself a new boyfriend. The chosen one was a Swedish longhaired punk rocker who played guitar in a punk band called Speedergarben. Pete asked Proxy if her new flame played bass and she quickly replied... "He can play bass".

Carl Janfalk (a.k.a. Calle) joined the band as Blood Tsunami entered Midrange Studios in January 2012 and together with engineer Anders Henningsen they recorded a new 6 track demo.

The quartet started playing live again and the first show for the new line up took place at Revolver in Oslo on 25 February 2012, as support for the British thrash band Virus. One month later Blood Tsunami entered Unholy Pub in Oslo and supported Grave Desecrator from Brazil.

Blood Tsunami was looking for a new label and the demo was shipped off to a few candidates. They got plenty of positive feedback and received some good offers, but this time they didn't want to rush things. Patiently they waited and finally Norway's own Indie Recordings had listened to the demo. A deal was signed and once again Blood Tsunami could enter the studio. In June 2012 they started the recording sessions at Sverre Dæhli's Fias Co Prod Studios where Faust nailed the drums within a few hours. Then they continued in Midrange Studios with Anders Henningsen and things was looking good.

Problems occurred when it was time to lay down the vocals. It turned out that Pete had seriously damaged his vocal chords and to get well he would need surgery. This set back forced them to postpone the recording session with almost two months. This break was spent to create the artwork and booklet. The whole graphic design was tailor-made to suit the new musical content of Blood Tsunami. Dark, filthyand all in black and white. American artist Christian Sloan Hall designed the artwork, Norwegian photographer Kjell Ivar Lund took the band photos and Pete once again designed a new band logo. The outcome is hard, mean and "in your face". Just like the music!

The new album has a Norwegian title. It is called "For Faen!" and according to the press release this is one of the most common words in the Norwegian language. "For Faen" can be translated into two things. Directly translated it means "For The Devil", but it can also mean something like "For Fuck's Sake".

For Faen! was released by Indie Recordings on 8 March 2013.

=== 2013–2018 ===
On 27 April 2018, they released Grave Condition, their first album in five years.

== Discography ==
=== Studio albums ===
Date of release	Title	Label
2007	Thrash Metal	Nocturnal Art Productions/Candlelight
2009	Grand Feast For Vultures	Nocturnal Art Productions/Candlelight
2013	For Faen!	Indie Recordings
2018	Grave Condition	Soulseller Records

=== Demos ===
Date of release	Title	Label
2004	Blood All Over	Independent
2005	Demo 05	Independent
2012	Demo 2012	Independent

=== EPs ===
Date of release	Title	Label
2009	Castle of Skulls	Nocturnal Art Productions/Candlelight

== Band members ==
- Pete Evil (Peter Michael Kolstad Vegem) – vocals, rhythm guitar (2004–present)
- Dor Amazon (Kristoffer Sørensen) – lead guitars, backing vocals (2004–present)
- Faust (Bård G. Eithun) – drums (2005–present)
- Calle (Carl Janfalk) – bass, backing vocals (2011–present)

=== Former members ===
- Peter "Bosse" Boström – bass and backing vocals (2005–2009)
- Riff Randall (Frode Sørskaar) – bass (2004–2005)
- Stu Manx (Stig Amundsen) – bass (2005)
- Jørgen "Jay" Nordlie – drums (2004–2005)
