= Disintegrate (Zyklon album) =

Studio album by Zyklon
- Released: 15 May 2006
- Recorded: November and December 2005
- Genre: Blackened death metal
- Length: 45:06
- Label: Candlelight Records
- Producer: Zyklon, Thorbjørn Akkerhaugen, Patrik J.

Zyklon chronology
| Aeon (2003) | Disintegrate (2006) |

Professional ratings
Review scores
| Source | Rating |
|---|---|
| About.com | 4/5 stars |
| Allmusic | 3/5 stars |

Disintegrate is the third and final studio album by Norwegian blackened death metal band Zyklon. It was released on 15 May 2006. Clocking at 45:06, Disintegrate is Zyklon's longest album. It was recorded from November to December 2005 at the "Akkerhaugen Lydstudio" in Norway.

== Track listing ==
All music written and arranged by Zyklon; all lyrics written by Bard "Faust" Eithun.

| No. | Title | Length |
|---|---|---|
| 1. | "In Hindsight" | 4:35 |
| 2. | "Disintegrate" | 4:02 |
| 3. | "Ways of the World" | 5:14 |
| 4. | "Subversive Faith" | 5:09 |
| 5. | "A Cold Grave" | 4:40 |
| 6. | "Vile Ritual" | 3:12 |
| 7. | "Underdog" | 3:50 |
| 8. | "Wrenched" | 5:15 |
| 9. | "Vulture" | 3:13 |
| 10. | "Skinned and Endangered" | 5:56 |
| Total length: | | 45:06 |

== Personnel ==
=== Zyklon ===
- Secthdamon – vocals, bass guitar
- Destructhor – lead guitar, backing vocals
- Samoth – rhythm guitar
- Trym – drums

=== Additional musicians ===
- Keyboard arrangements and programming by Thorbjørn Akkerhaugen and Zyklon.
- Additional keyboard arrangement and programming on "Skinned and Endangered" by Cosmo and Miza[R] @ Mordisco Recordings

== Production ==
- Produced by Zyklon, Thorbjørn Akkerhaugen and Patrik J. Sten
- Recorded at Akkerhaugen Lydstudio, Norway, November and December 2005
- Engineered by Thorbjørn Akkerhaugen,
- Mixed at Studio Fredman, Sweden, by Patrik J and Fredrik Nordström, February 2006
- Mastered at Tailor Maid by Peter In de Betou
