= World ov Worms =

Studio album by Zyklon
- Released: 15 May 2001
- Genre: Blackened death metal
- Length: 41:19
- Label: Candlelight Records
- Producer: Zyklon & Thorbjørn Akkerhaugen

Zyklon chronology
World ov Worms (2001)	Aeon (2003)

Professional ratings
Review scores
Source	Rating
AllMusic	4/5 stars

World ov Worms is the debut album by the Norwegian black metal band Zyklon. It was released in 2001 by Candlelight Records.

== Track listing ==
All lyrics by Bård "Faust" Eithun, with lyrical ideas (on "Terrordrome") and title concept (on "Worm World" and "Zycloned") by Samoth. All songs copyright Abstract Sounds Ltd/Tanglade Music Ltd.

No.	Title	Music	Length
1.	"Hammer Revelation"	Samoth, Destructhor	6:23
2.	"Deduced to Overkill"	Samoth, Destructhor	3:17
3.	"Chaos Deathcult"	Samoth, Destructhor, Thorbjørn Akkerhaugen	6:00
4.	"Storm Detonation"	Samoth, Destructhor	4:42
5.	"Zycloned"	Samoth, Trym	5:24
6.	"Terrordrome"	Samoth, Destructhor	3:59
7.	"Worm World"	Samoth, Destructhor	4:15
8.	"Transcendental War – Battle between Gods"	Samoth, Destructhor	7:19

== Personnel ==
=== Zyklon ===
- Daemon – lead vocals, main vocal arrangement
- Destructhor – lead and bass guitars
- Samoth – rhythm and bass guitars
- Trym – drums, percussion, programming

=== Additional musicians ===
- Trickster G – clean vocals on "Transcendental War…" and spoken words on "Chaos Deathcult"
- Thorbjørn Akkerhaugen – programming, effects, keyboard and bass arrangements
- Persephone – spoken female voice

=== Production ===
- Arranged by Zyklon
- Produced by Zyklon and Thorbjørn Akkerhaugen
- Recorded, engineered and mixed by Thorbjørn Akkerhaugen
- Mastered by Tom Kvalsvoll
