= Chaos Magic =

Chaos Magic or Chaos Magick may refer to:

- Chaos magic, a modern tradition of magic
- Chaos Magic (band), a Chilean symphonic metal band
- Chaos Magick (album), a 2015 album by Saturnian Mist
- Chaos Magick, an American avant-garde band featured in John Zorn's discography
