= Samoth =

Norwegian guitarist (born 1974)

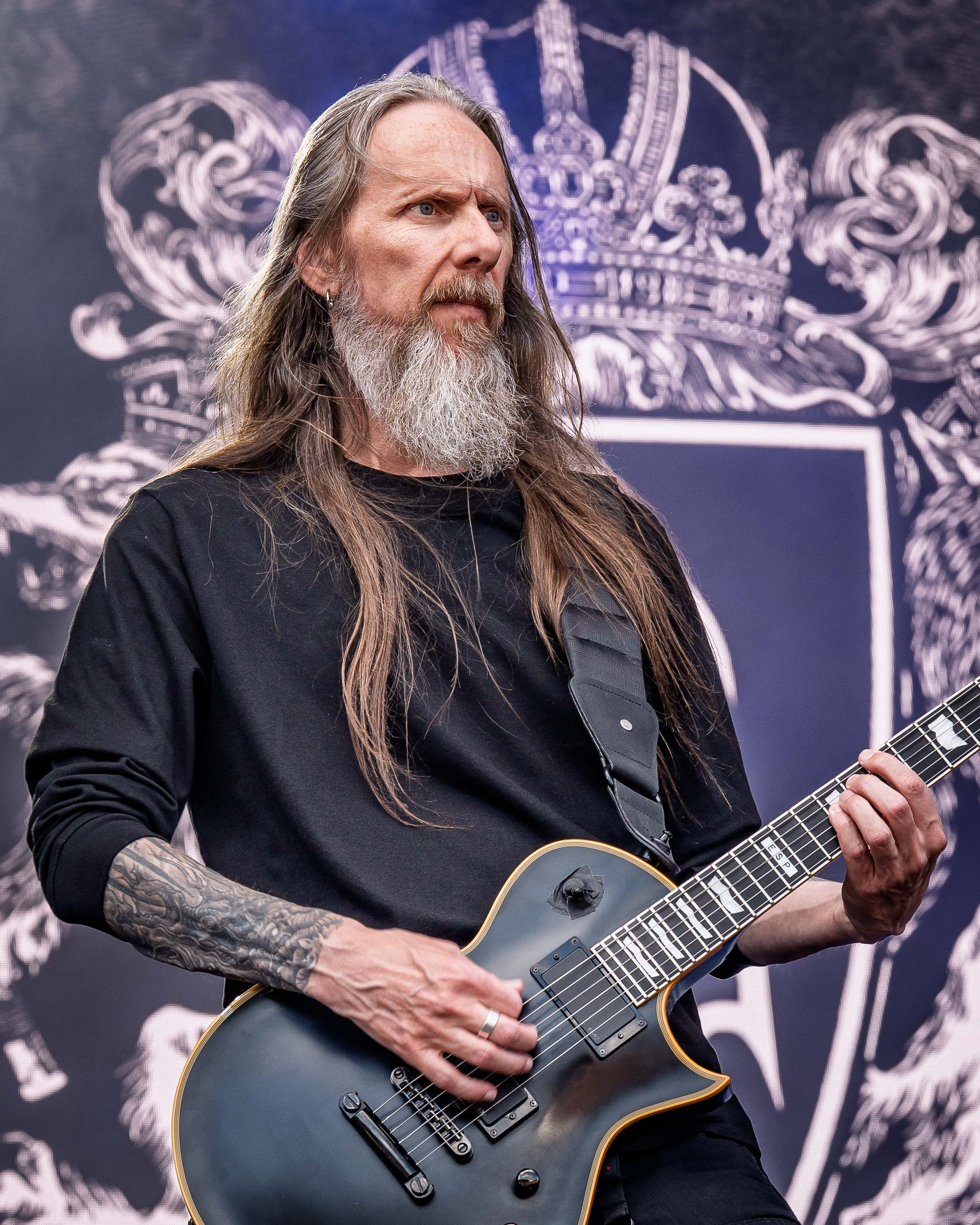
- Samoth with Emperor at Tons of Rock 2025

Background information
- Also known as: Samoth, Samot (early)
- Born: Tomas Thormodsæter Haugen; 9 June 1974 (age 52); Hammerfest, Norway
- Genres: Black metal; death metal; thrash metal
- Occupation: Musician
- Instruments: Guitar; bass guitar; keyboards; synthesizers; drums; viola; violin; double bass
- Member of: Emperor; Scum; The Wretched End
- Formerly of: Zyklon; Zyklon-B; Gorgoroth; Satyricon

Tomas Thormodsæter Haugen (born 9 June 1974), better known by his stage name Samoth, is a Norwegian guitarist and multi-instrumentalist in the country's black metal scene. He is well known for his distinct guitar work and drumming in the band Emperor, as well as his formation of the death metal band Zyklon. In very early Emperor releases, he was called Samot (his name "Tomas" backwards), and with the formation of Zyklon he became known as Zamoth. Samoth was the owner of the record label Nocturnal Art Productions and had a close relationship with Candlelight Records.

== Biography ==
Samoth was born on 9 June 1974 in Hammerfest. He is the son of Spoonful of Blues bass player Jens Haugen, who encouraged his son to play bass guitar. He grew up in Akkerhaugen, Norway. When Samoth was a young man, he met fellow musician Vegard Tveitan, who would later become known as Ihsahn, at a rock clinic in Bergen. The two soon became friends and started playing music together. They formed a band and moved through various names – they were called Dark Device, Xerasia, and finally Embryonic. The group eventually settled on the name Thou Shalt Suffer in 1991. They were playing an early form of keyboard-assisted black metal and strongly influenced by death metal, particularly vocally.

Samoth and Ihsahn's friendship proved to be strong, and the two eventually took their musicianship to a new level. Partially due to the influence of Euronymous of the band Mayhem, Samoth left Thou Shalt Suffer and with Ihsahn, began writing music for a new band called Emperor (in which he played drums). Ihsahn was the only member of Thou Shalt Suffer to remain, and soon bass player Mortiis and drummer Faust were recruited for Emperor; Samoth moved back to his more familiar position of guitar. At this point, the group was playing fully developed black metal. Emperor was quick to release several demos in 1992 and 1993, which gained them recognition and popularity in the underground. Mortiis did not stay in the band, and decided to form his own, more electronic-based solo band. He was succeeded by Tchort.

In 1994, Samoth was sentenced to 16 months in prison for burning Skjold Church in Vindafjord Municipality, together with Varg Vikernes. The arson was committed during a pause in the recording of the Burzum EP Aske (Ashes), where Samoth performed as a session bass player. As Tchort and Faust were also imprisoned at this time, Ihsahn was the only remaining band member outside prison, and Emperor did not release another album for three years. Tchort and Faust did not return to the band.

After years of playing in Emperor and being featured on various black metal side projects, Samoth, in conjunction with Ihsahn, decided to dissolve Emperor in 2001 due to their differing musical tastes. Although black metal was both Samoth and Ihsahn's biggest influence and favorite genre of music, Samoth was leaning toward a futuristic death metal sound, while Ihsahn was more influenced by progressive metal and symphonic metal. After Emperor's final release, Prometheus: The Discipline of Fire & Demise, composed entirely by Ihsahn, Emperor was no more. Samoth went on to play guitar with fellow drummer Trym in the death metal band Zyklon.

Emperor regrouped in 2006 with the core trio of Ihsahn, Samoth and Trym augmented by a bassist and a keyboardist, and played a few one-night-off gigs in Europe and US in 2006 and 2007.

Recently Samoth was involved in Norwegian-American supergroup Scum, which also featured Bård Faust, Cosmocrator of Mindgrinder, Chasey Chaos of Amen and Happy Tom from Turbonegro.

Samoth did voice work for 2007's Adult Swim cartoon Metalocalypse episode "Dethfashion".

In 2008, Samoth formed The Wretched End with Cosmo and went on to release 3 albums: Ominous (2010), Inroads (2012) and In These Woods, From These Mountains (2016).

== Personal life ==
Haugen was married to German musician Andrea Haugen (née Meyer), with whom he fathered a daughter. The couple later divorced. On 13 October 2021, Andrea was killed alongside four other people in the Kongsberg attack.

After his divorce from Andrea, he married his second wife Erin, with whom he also has a daughter.

== Endorsements and equipment ==
Endorsements

- ESP Guitars & Basses
- Marshall Amplifiers
- Vader Cabinets
- Dunlop Picks
- Ernie Ball Strings

Other equipment

- Gibson Guitars
- Jackson Guitars
- B.C. Rich Guitars
- Fender Basses
- ENGL Amplifiers
- Peavey Amplifiers
- Pearl Drums & Hardware
- Sabian Cymbals
- Ahead drumsticks

Drum kit

Samoth has stated in an interview with Metal Hammer that the following kit was used by himself to record drum tracks for the demo "Wrath of the Tyrant".

- Pearl Export Drums (jet black w/ black hardware)
  - 22 in × 18 in (560 mm × 460 mm) Bass Drum
  - 13 in × 6.5 in (330 mm × 170 mm) Snare Drum
  - 10 in × 8 in (250 mm × 200 mm) Mounted Tom
  - 12 in × 9 in (300 mm × 230 mm) Mounted Tom
  - 13 in × 10 in (330 mm × 250 mm) Mounted Tom
  - 16 in × 16 in (410 mm × 410 mm) Floor Tom
  - Pearl Eliminator Double Pedal
- Sabian and Wuhan Cymbals
  - 20 in (510 mm) Sabian Solar Ride
  - 14 in (360 mm) AA Sizzle Hats
  - 18 in (460 mm) Wuhan China
  - 19 in (480 mm) B8 Rock Crash
  - 6 in (150 mm) AA splash
  - 12 in (300 mm) Wuhan china
  - 18 in (460 mm) B8 Pro Heavy Crash
  - 20 in (510 mm) AAX Metal Ride
  - 22 in (560 mm) Wuhan China

== Discography ==
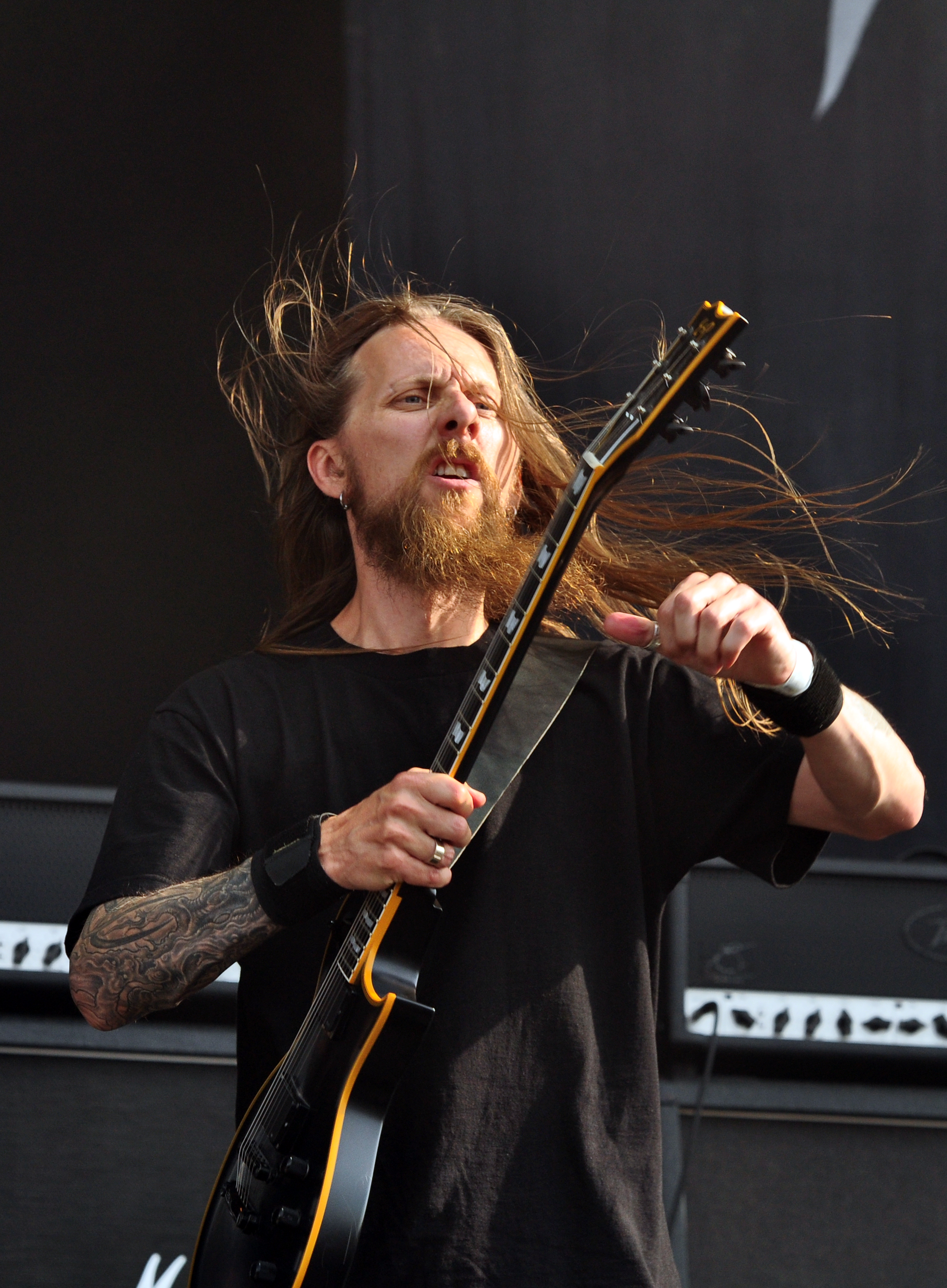
Samoth performing in 2014

Year	Title	Band	Role
1990	Rehearsals '90 (demo)	Xerasia	guitar
1990	The Land Of The Lost Souls (demo)	Embryonic	guitar, bass
1991	Into The Woods Of Belial (demo)	Thou Shalt Suffer	guitar
1991	Open The Mysteries Of Your Creations (EP)	Thou Shalt Suffer	guitar
1992	Wrath of the Tyrant (demo)	Emperor	drums
1992	Seven Harmonies of Unknown Truths (demo)	Ildjarn	session vocals
1993	Emperor / Hordanes Land (split with Enslaved)	Emperor	guitar
1993	Aske (EP)	Burzum	session bass
1994	As the Shadows Rise (EP)	Emperor	guitar
1994	In The Nightside Eclipse	Emperor	guitar
1994	Pentagram	Gorgoroth	bass
1994	The Shadowthrone	Satyricon	bass, guitar
1994	Constellation (EP)	Arcturus	guitar
1994	Blood Must be Shed (EP)	Zyklon-B	guitar
1997	Reverence (EP)	Emperor	guitar
1997	Anthems to the Welkin at Dusk	Emperor	guitar
1998	The Winds That Spoke of Midgard's Fate	Hagalaz' Runedance	war drums, violas, contrabass
1999	Thorns Vs. Emperor (Split with Thorns)	Emperor	bass, guitar
1999	IX Equilibrium	Emperor	guitar
2001	World ov Worms	Zyklon	bass, guitar
2001	Prometheus: The Discipline of Fire & Demise	Emperor	guitar
2003	Aeon	Zyklon	guitar
2004	Valfar, ein Windir	Notodden All Stars	guitar on cover of "Destroy"
2005	Gospels for the Sick	Scum	guitar
2006	Disintegrate	Zyklon	guitar
2010	Ominous	The Wretched End	guitar
2012	Inroads	The Wretched End	guitar
2016	In These Woods, from These Mountains	The Wretched End	guitar
