= Gospels for the Sick =

Studio album by Scum
- Released: 5 September 2005
- Recorded: September 2004
- Studio: Crystal Canyon Studios, Oslo, Norway
- Genre: Hardcore punk, black metal
- Length: 41:37
- Label: DogJob Records; Bitzcore; Candlelight Records
- Producer: Scum; Casey Chaos

Gospels for the Sick is the debut and only album of the hardcore punk/black metal supergroup Scum. The album was released on 5 September 2005 through DogJob Records, Bitzcore and Candlelight Records. The album is noted for its fusion of black metal and hardcore punk, and features guest contributions from Nocturno Culto of Darkthrone, Mortiis and Turbonegro guitarist Knut Schreiner. This ended up being the band’s only album following the death of Casey Chaos in December 2024.

== Recording and release ==
The album was recorded during a session at Crystal Canyon Studios in Oslo in September 2004. The music was composed by Samoth, Cosmocrator and Casey Chaos, while the lyrics were all written by Chaos. The album's artwork was done by Stephen O'Malley, with photography by Sebastian Ludvigsen. The album was released on 5 September 2005 to positive reviews from both Norwegian and international critics. The album's sound was described as "raw punk mixed with thrash and metal" with the production noted as "angry and dirty." The album was nominated for the Norwegian Alarm Awards in the Metal category in 2005.

Professional ratings
Review scores
Source	Rating
AllMusic	3/5 stars
Bergens Tidende	5/6 stars
Blabbermouth.net	6.5/10
Collector's Guide to Heavy Metal	7/10
Metal.de	8/10
Punknews.org	5/5 stars
Rock Hard	7.5/10
Verdens Gang	5/6 stars

== Track listing ==
All tracks are written by Casey Chaos, Cosmocrator and Samoth.

No.	Title	Length
1.	"Protest Life"	5:16
2.	"Gospels for the Sick"	5:05
3.	"Throw Up on You"	3:15
4.	"Night of 1000 Deaths"	3:45
5.	"Truth Won't Be Sold"	3:37
6.	"Hate the Sane"	4:26
7.	"Deathpunkscumfuck"	2:07
8.	"Road to Sufferage"	4:33
9.	"Backstabbers Go to Heaven"	4:12
10.	"The Perfect Mistake"	5:22
Total length:		41:37

== Personnel ==
Scum

- Casey Chaos (Karim Chmielinski) – vocals, mixing
- Samoth (Tomas Haugen) – guitar
- Cosmocrator (Andre Søgnen) – guitar
- Happy-Tom (Thomas Seltzer) – bass
- Faust (Bård Eithun) – drums

Additional personnel

- Marius Bodin Larsen – engineer, mixing
- Tom Kvålsvoll – mastering
- Stephen O'Malley – artwork
- Sebastian Ludvigsen – photography
- Knut Schreiner – lead guitar (track 3)
- Mortiis (Håvard Ellefsen) – backing vocals (track 9)
- Nocturno Culto (Ted Skjellum) – vocals (track 10)
