= Lucifer Rising =

Lucifer Rising may refer to:

- Lucifer Rising (film), 1972 experimental film by Kenneth Anger
  - Lucifer Rising (Bobby Beausoleil album), 1980 soundtrack to the film
- Lucifer Rising (novel), 1993 Doctor Who novel by Andy Lane and Jim Mortimore
- Lucifer Rising (Baddeley book), 1999 publication by Church of Satan priest Gavin Baddeley
- Lucifer Rising (Kaamos album), 2005 death metal release
- Lucifer Rising (Candlemass EP), 2008 doom metal release, or its title track
- "Lucifer Rising" (Supernatural), 2009 episode of the television series Supernatural
- "Lucifer Rising", song from the 2013 Rob Zombie album Venomous Rat Regeneration Vendor
