= Aeon (album) =

Studio album by Zyklon
- Released: 2003
- Genre: Blackened death metal
- Length: 41:54
- Label: Candlelight
- Producer: Thorbjørn Akkerhaugen, Fredrik Nordström, Zyklon

Zyklon chronology
| World ov Worms (2001) | Aeon (2003) | Disintegrate (2006) |

Professional ratings
Review scores
| Source | Rating |
|---|---|
| AllMusic | 3/5 stars |

Aeon is the second studio album by the Norwegian black metal band Zyklon. It was released in 2003 through Candlelight Records.

== Track listing ==
Music by Zyklon (except track 5, written by Zyklon & Cosmocrator); lyrics By Bård "Faust" Eithun.

| No. | Title | Length |
|---|---|---|
| 1. | "Psyklon Aeon" | 3:26 |
| 2. | "Core Solution" | 5:12 |
| 3. | "Subtle Manipulation" | 3:17 |
| 4. | "Two Thousand Years" | 5:49 |
| 5. | "No Names Above the Names" | 4:16 |
| 6. | "The Prophetic Method" | 3:16 |
| 7. | "Specimen Eruption" | 4:38 |
| 8. | "Electric Current" | 5:44 |
| 9. | "An Eclectic Manner" | 6:16 |

== Personnel ==
=== Zyklon ===
- Secthdamon – vocals, bass guitar, synth arrangements, programming
- Destructhor – lead guitar, synth arrangements, programming
- Samoth – rhythm guitar, synth arrangements, programming
- Trym Torson – drums, synth arrangements, programming

=== Additional musicians ===
- Thorbjørn Akkerhaugen: Synth Arrangements & Programming
- Matt Jarman/Dissident Sound Industries – outro arrangement & programming on "Electric Current"
- Daemon – backing and additional vocals on "Two Thousand Years", "The Prophetic Method" and "Electric Current"
- Ofu Kahn – lead vocals on "An Eclectic Manner"
- Lrz – additional drones and programming on "An Eclectic Manner"

=== Production ===
- Produced by Thorbjørn Akkerhaugen, Fredrik Nordström and Zyklon
- Recorded, engineered and mixed by Fredrik Nordstrom
- Mastered by Tom Kvålsvoll and Samoth
- Designed by Stephen O'Malley in co-operation with Samoth
