= Lost Eden (disambiguation) =

Lost Eden is a 1995 video game by Cryo Interactive.

Lost Eden may also refer to:

- Lost Eden (band), a Japanese melodic death metal band
- Lost Eden, Arizona, a populated place in the United States of America
- Africa's Lost Eden, a program broadcast on Nat Geo Wild, see list of Nat Geo Wild original programming
- Lost Eden, a fictional band in the anime television series Visual Prison
- Lost Eden, a 2006 expansion pack to the video game Anarchy Online
- Diabolik Lovers: Lost Eden, a 2017 video game part of the Diabolik Lovers series
