= Destructhor =

Norwegian musician

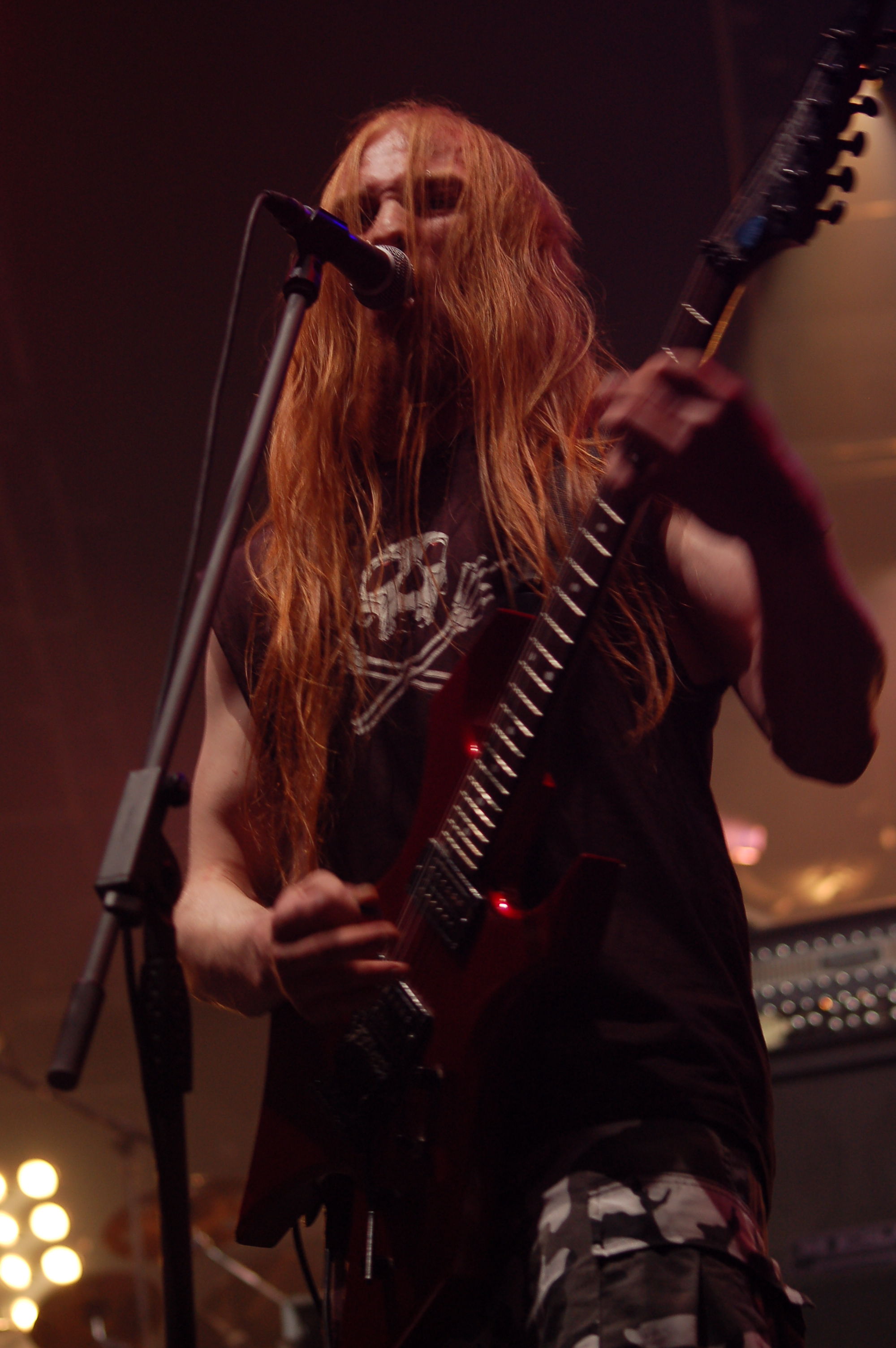
- Metalmania 2007 – Zyklon – Thor 'Destructhor' Myhren 02

Background information
- Birth name: Thor Anders Myhren
- Born: 8 March 1978 (age 47) Norway
- Genres: Death metal Blackened death metal
- Occupation: Musician
- Instrument(s): Guitar, vocals
- Years active: 1993-present

Thor Anders Myhren (born 8 March 1978), better known as Destructhor, is a Norwegian musician, currently the vocalist and guitarist for metal band Myrkskog and guitarist for black metal band Nordjevel. He is the former guitarist for bands Morbid Angel and Zyklon. He joined Morbid Angel in 2008 and departed in 2015. He has worked as a live guitarist with 1349 including Inferno festival in 2008 and 2015. He plays with black/death metal project Nader Sadek in live settings, and has recorded solos for the project for their debut "In the flesh"

== Discography ==
=== Myrkskog ===
- Deathmachine (2000, Candlelight Records)
- Superior Massacre (2002, Candlelight Records)

=== Zyklon ===
- World ov Worms (2001, Candlelight Records)
- Aeon (2003, Candlelight Records)
- Disintegrate (2006, Candlelight Records)
- Storm Detonation Live (2006, DVD, Candlelight Records)

=== Morbid Angel ===
- Illud Divinum Insanus (2011, Season of Mist)

=== Nordjevel ===
- Necrogenesis (2019, Osmose Productions)

=== As guest member ===
Year	Band	Album	Track(s)
2008	Gloria Morti	Eryx	Guitars (lead) (track 9)
2011	Nader Sadek	In the Flesh	Guitars (lead) (additional)
2012	Lover of Sin	Horny Beast	Guitars (lead) (track 10)
2013	Koldbrann	Vertigo	Guitars (lead) (track 4)
2014	Bled Dry	Bled Dry	Guitars (solo) (track 8)
2017	Nidingr	The High Heat Licks Against Heaven	Vocals (backing)
