= Kaamos (Swedish band) =

Swedish death metal band

- Origin: Stockholm, Sweden
- Genre: Death metal
- Years active: 1998–2006
- Label: Candlelight
- Members: Karl Envall; Nicklas Eriksson; Konstantin Papavassilou; Cristofer Barkensjö
- Past members: Johan Thörngren; Thomas Åberg

Kaamos was a Swedish death metal band formed in 1998 and disbanded in 2006. The band's name comes from the Finnish word for polar night. The original members were Johan Thörngren, Thomas Åberg, Nicklas Eriksson, and Konstantin Papvassilou.

== History ==
The group wrote and recorded three songs on a cassette in 1999. Two of the songs were released by Dauthus on a limited 7”. After the release, bassist and singer Johan Thörngren left the band and Karl Envall replaced him.

In 2000, drummer Thomas Åberg quit and was replaced with Cristofer Barkensjö (also known as Chris Piss). They wrote and recorded five new songs as the demo Curse of Aeons, released in 2001. Kaamos received offers from labels, and signed with Candlelight Records.

In November 2001, Kaamos started recording their debut album with Messiah Marcolin. The band recorded nine tracks in ten days. The self-titled album was released in May 2002. Throughout 2002–2003, the band toured several European countries.

In March 2004, Kaamos began recording their second album, Lucifer Rising, released in February 2005. After the release, Kaamos went on another tour. In 2006, the band announced that they were splitting up. Before this announcement, they had recorded five final songs, released after the band's demise. The resulting MCD was titled Scales of Leviathan and Greek label Nuclear Winter Records released it as a limited digipak and standard jewel case CD.

After their dissolution, guitarist Konstantin Papavassilou formed doom metal band Head Of The Demon in 2012 with original Kaamos drummer, Thomas Åberg. In 2011, Karl Envall, Nicklas Eriksson, and Cristofer Barkensjo formed death metal band The Curse. In 2013, Barkensjo left The Curse to form death metal band LIK.

== Discography ==
- Promo 99 (Demo, 1999)
- Kaamos (7", 1999)
- Curse of Aeons (Demo 2001. Vinyl 10", 2004)
- Kaamos (CD, LP, 2002)
- Lucifer Rising (CD, LP, 2005)
- Scales Of Leviathan (CD, 2007)

== Members ==
- Karl Envall - vocals, bass guitar (1999–2006)
- Nicklas Eriksson - guitar (1998–2006)
- Konstantin Papavassilou - guitar (1998–2006)
- Cristofer Barkensjö (Chris Piss) - drums (2000–2006) (Grave, Face Down)

=== Former members ===
- Johan Thörngren - vocals, bass guitar (1998–1999)
- Thomas Åberg - drums (1998–2000)
