= Slagmaur =

- Origin: Brekstad and Trondheim, Norway
- Genre: Black metal
- Years active: 1997–present
- Label: Prophecy Productions

Slagmaur is a Norwegian black metal band from Brekstad and Trondheim, formed in 1997 and originally named Norske Synder.

== History ==
Slagmaur was formed in 1997 under the name Norske Synder (translates to "Norwegian Sins") before changing name in 2006. An official band statement claimed them to be "the darkest and scariest black metal band to ever set foot on planet earth." A trilogy of releases during 2006–2007—Svin (Swine), Skrekk (Fear/Horror), and Domfeldt (Convicted)—described the presence of and the fight against the narrow-minded small-town monsters.

The album Svin was later picked up by German record company Black Hate Productions for a re-release. A record deal with Osmose Productions (France) in 2009 resulted in the re-releases of Domfeldt and also the band's first album Skrekk Lich Kunstler (orig. 2007). In addition, they released two new albums with Osmose; Von Rov Shelter (2009) and Thill Smitts Terror (2017).

Slagmaur have described their sound as “twisted and sinister black metal, multi layered and complex.” In an October 2025-article in Loudwire, Røstad is listed as one of 5 black metal musicians who don't fit the stereotype. Drachman writes: “Gribbsphiiser infuses Slagmaur’s otherworldly, brutal yet sophisticated cacophonies with industrial metal, jazz, doom, noise rock, classical, etc.”

The band have also attracted interest for their conceptualized, unusual imagery and live shows which display a theatrical horror aesthetic and bizarre live antics. Their set at the 2017 edition of the Inferno festival, which quickly generated controversy, featured staged executions by hanging as well as a model/stuntman tied to an upside-down cross which was set on fire at the end of the show, while band members “prowled around the stage, looking genuinely psychotic and to be gaining pleasure from the on-stage executions.” The concert reportedly induced strong discomfort among the audience and has been described as “one of the most extreme live acts ever performed,” with renowned heavy metal magazine Metal Hammer Norway reporting “It's not easy to shock in black metal today, but Slagmaur did it.”

=== False missing-person report ===
In November 2025, several foreign metal websites reported that Røstad and Snorre Ruch had been declared missing after a forest hike. The only Norwegian source that confirmed the report was the online newspaper Fosen Folket, which, in turn, published a series of detailed and rather prosaic articles about the incident, the missing individuals, and mysterious events in the same area. However, in the comments sections on social media, the credibility of Fosen Folket was quickly questioned; people pointed out that it was a newly created website, that all images were edited in a style Røstad – who is also a photographer – is known for, and that the presentation of staff suggested the individuals were fictitious. Among other things, one could find the “investigative journalist” Harry Håndane, whose profile photo was a portrait of Harry Houdini.

During the days when Røstad and Ruch were supposedly missing, no reports ever appeared in editor-controlled media, either locally or nationally. A couple of days after the first announcement, it was revealed that the whole thing had been a social experiment and a promotional stunt connected to the upcoming release of the album Hulders Ritual.

== Personnel ==
=== Current line up ===
- Rune “General Gribbsphiiser” Røstad – vocals (lead & choirs), guitars, bass, drums, piano, synths, cello, music, lyrics (2006–present)
- Robert Myrhaug – drums and keyboards (2014–present)
- Glenn “Dr. Von Hellreich” Nilsen – vocals (lead) (2016–present)

=== Past members ===
- Aatselgribb – vocals (lead), bass, piano (2006–2014)
- Lt. Wardr - drums, percussion, keyboards (2006–2014)
- Steingrim "Mehimoloth" Torson – vocals (2007–2009, his death)

=== Live/session members ===
- Mr. Unt Zilla – bass, guitars, programming (2006–present)

== Discography ==
- Svin (2006), self-published, re-released by Black Hate Productions in 2007, and by Osmose Productions in 2009
- Skrekk (2006), self-published
- Domfeldt (2007), self-published, re-released as digipack by Inferna Profundus Records in 2008
- Helvette (2007), self-published music cassette with unused material from the three previous releases, limited to 30 copies
- Skrekk Lich Kunstler (2007), self-published, re-released by Osmose Productions in 2009
- Von Rov Shelter (2009), Osmose Productions
- Thill Smitts Terror (2017), Osmose Productions
- "Ritual Dogs" (single) (2022), Nekk Brekk Productions
- Hulders Ritual (2026)
