= Crescent (Egyptian band) =

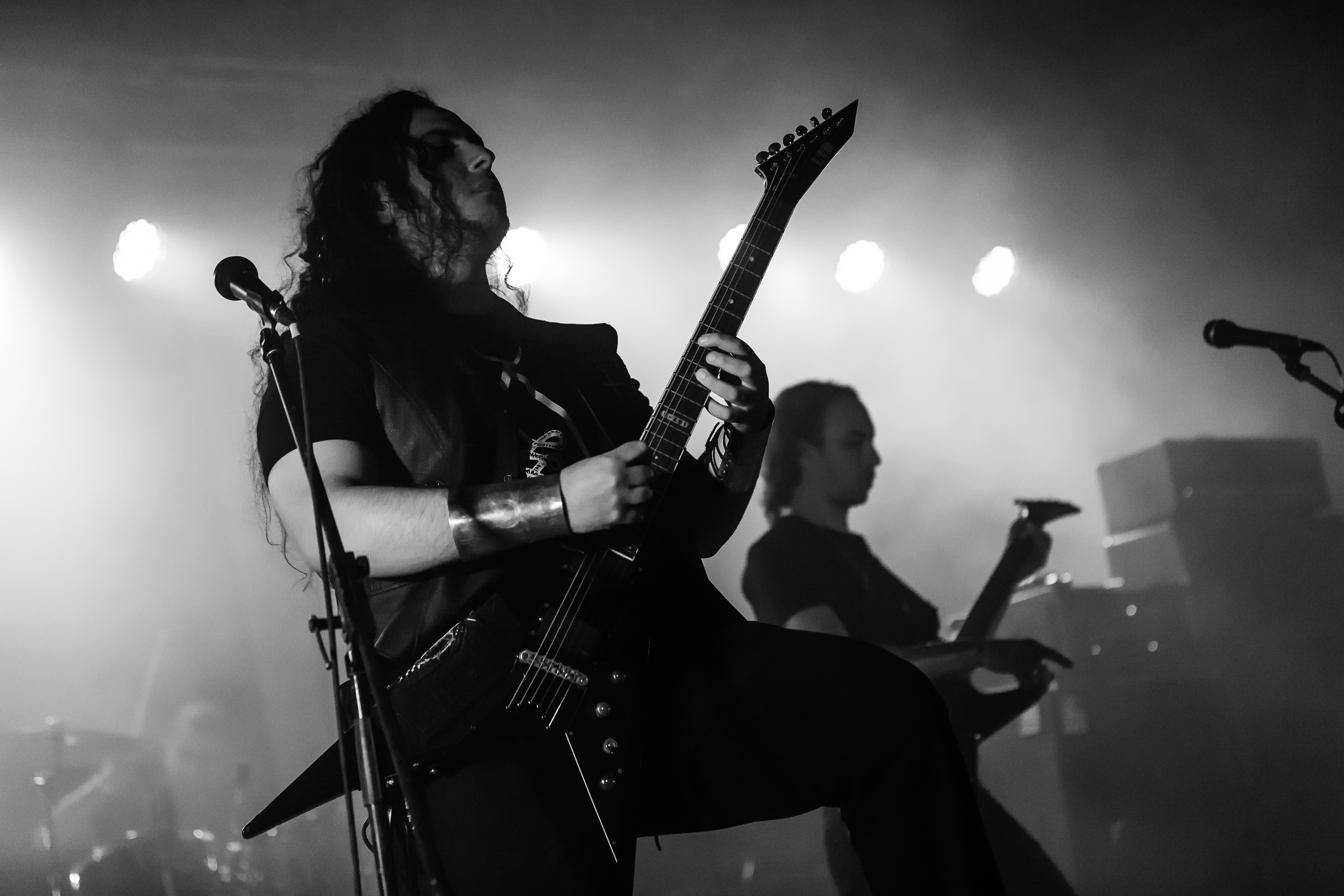

Background information
- Origin: Cairo, Egypt
- Genres: Death metal; blackened death metal; pagan metal
- Years active: 1998–present
- Labels: Listenable Records
- Website: www.crescentband.com www.facebook.com/Crescentband/

Crescent is a blackened death metal band from Cairo, Egypt, founded in 1998. Crescent formed in 1998 as a black metal band, making it one of the oldest extreme metal bands in Egypt and the region. It was the first to perform at Wacken Open Air and many other festivals and countries. Crescent headlined numerous gigs and concerts in their homeland – Egypt, such as in El Sawy Culture Wheel, Bibliotheca Alexandrina, Swiss Club, Azhar Park and many other small venues.

== History ==
=== Founding and early days (1998) ===
Crescent was formed in 1998 in Cairo, Egypt by Ismaeel Attallah and Amr Mokhtar. They started as a pure black metal band, inspired by Dissection, At The Gates, Death and Bolt Thrower. They released a demo in 1999 titled Edgar Allan Poe's "Dreamland". Later, they started gradually shifting towards the Egyptian death metal sound using Eastern sounding scales, going back to the roots to embrace the Egyptian sound.

=== EP: The Retribution (2008) ===
In 2008, they released the EP, The Retribution which marked their shift towards a more melodic and death metal-inclined sound.

=== Pyramid Slaves (2014) and Metal Apocalypse Euro tour ===
Before Pyramid Slaves, Crescent changed about four of rhythm guitarists. They self-released Pyramid Slaves in 2014, which signified their ultimate shift towards their unique blackened death metal with Egyptian elements sound they possess today along with adopting Ancient Egyptian-based lyrical themes. In the same year, Crescent announced being on the Metal Apocalypse Euro Tour. They went on the tour in May 2014 sharing the stage with international bands covering Germany, Austria, Czech Republic, Netherlands and Belgium.

=== Wacken 2014 and new rhythm guitarist (2015) ===
2014 is the year that marked Crescent going international. On 30 July 2014, Crescent won the local metal battle of the bands 2014 in Cairo, Ginnina Theater at Azhar Park and represented Egypt for the first time at Wacken’s 25th Anniversary. Crescent was the first band from Egypt and the Middle East to participate in Wacken, battling against 30 other countries and reaching the top 10. On the first day of 2015, they announced Youssef Saleh as the new rhythm guitarist and backing-vocalist and on 3 April they took part of the Inferno Fest in Norway sharing stage with bands including Behemoth, Septicflesh, My Dying Bride, Bloodbath, 1349, Enslaved and many more. They co-headlined Metal Blast Festival (Egypt) in the same year.

=== The Order of Amenti (2015-2017) ===
Crescent started working on their second album The Order of Amenti in 2015. In 2016, Crescent performed at Rockstadt Extreme Fest Indoor Edition in Romania, sharing stage with Enslaved, Samael, Anaal Nathrakh, Oceans of Slumber, Ne Obliviscaris, Sinister

In 2017, Crescent performed at Ukraine's top metal festivals: Carpathian Alliance (sharing stage with Hate, Cruachan, Horna, Cemetery of Scream, Darkened Nocturn Slaughtercult and many more) and Metal Head's Mission (headliner). In the same year, Crescent performed at Fall of Summer Festival in France among some of the biggest bands in the metal world. In October of the same year, Crescent finalized the making of The Order of Amenti which was mixed and mastered by Vamacara Studio in France.

Crescent is the first and only metal band from Egypt to perform at Wacken Open Air and in France, Ukraine, Norway, and Romania.

=== Carving the Fires of Akhet (2021-) ===
On July 16, they released their 3rd album Carving the Fires of Akhet.

The album was nominated 'Global Metal Release Of The Year' at the 2021 Global Metal Apocalypse awards, the album finished 10th.

== Members ==
Current members

- Ismaeel Attalah - lead vocals and lead guitar (1998–present)
- Jake Shuker- rhythm guitar and backing vocals (2024–present)
- André - bass guitar and backing vocals (2019–present)
- Julian Dietrich - drums (2020–present)

Former members

- Amr Mokhtar - drums (1998–2020)
- Moanis Salem - bass guitar (2007–2019)
- Al Sharif Marzeban - rhythm guitar (2009-2010)
- Farouque Akef - rhythm guitar (2010)
- Omar Abou Doma - rhythm guitar (2011–2012)
- Mohamed Adel - rhythm guitar (2013-2014)

== Discography ==
=== Albums ===
- Pyramid Slaves (2014)
- The Order of Amenti (2018)
- Carving the Fires of Akhet (2021)

=== EPs ===
- The Retribution (EP, 2008)

=== Demos ===
- Dreamland (1999)
