= For Faen! =

Studio album by Blood Tsunami
- Released: March 8, 2013
- Genre: Thrash metal
- Length: 31:05
- Label: Indie Recordings

Blood Tsunami chronology
Grand Feast For Vultures (2009)	For Faen! (2013)	Grave Condition (2018)

Professional ratings
Review scores
Source	Rating
Rock Hard	8/10

For Faen! is the third album by the Norwegian thrash metal band Blood Tsunami, released on March 8, 2013 by Indie Recordings.

== Track listing ==
1. "Butcher of Rostov" – 04:11
2. "Dogfed" – 01:32
3. "The Rape of Nanking" – 01:58
4. "In the Dungeon of the Rats" – 03:17
5. "Metal Fang" – 03:20
6. "The Brazen Bull" – 04:44
7. "Grave Desecrator" – 03:34
8. "Unholy Nights" – 02:45
9. "B.T.K. – 01:38
10. "Krokodil" – 04:06

== Personnel ==
- Pete Evil – vocals, guitars
- Faust – drums
- Carl Janfalk – bass, backing vocals
- Dor Amazon – guitars, backing vocals
