= Saturnian Mist =

Finnish black metal band

- Origin: Kuopio, Finland
- Genres: Black metal
- Years active: 2006–present
- Labels: Candlelight Records; Drakkar Productions; Ahdistuksen Aihio Productions
- Members: fra. Zetekh fra. Ptahaz fra. Chaoswind fra. Macabrum fra. Psychonaught fra. Vile
- Website: saturnianmist.net

Saturnian Mist is a black metal band that formed in 2006 at Kuopio, Finland by vocalist fra. Zetekh and guitarist fra. Chaoswind. Lyrically the band draws their inspiration from Occult, Mysticism, Philosophy and Satanism.

== Members ==
=== Current members ===
- fra. Zetekh – vocals
- fra. Chaoswind – guitar
- fra. Ptahaz – guitar (formerly bass)
- fra. Macabrum – bass guitar
- fra. Psychonaught – percussions
- fra. Vile – drums

=== Former members ===
- Desolate – bass guitar (2012–2013)
- Flamen – bass guitar (live) (2012–2012)
- A – drums (2008–2009 & 2012-2012)
- Shu-Ananda – guitar (2010–2012)
- Wyrmfang – Drums (2009–2011)
- Det – bass guitar (live) (2011–2011)
- Noxifer – Guitars, drums (2009–2010)

== Discography ==
=== Studio albums ===
- Shamatanic (2021), Petrichor / Hammerheart Records
- Chaos Magick (2015), Candlelight Records
- Gnostikoi Ha-Shaitan (2011), Ahdistuksen Aihio Productions

=== EPs ===
- Repellings (2009), Descending Towards Damnation

=== Splits ===
- Saturnian Mist / Creatura (2009), Monokrom Records

=== Music videos ===
- Bloodsoaked Chakrament (2015), Candlelight Records
- The True Law (2014), Candlelight Records
- Aura Mystica (2011), Ahdistuksen Aihio Productions

=== Demos ===
- Demonstrations MMXIII] (2013), self-produced
- Promo 2010 (2010), self-produced
- Saturnian Mist (2008), Drakkar Productions
