= Scum (band) =

Hardcore punk/black metal band (2002–2005)

- Origin: Norway
- Genres: Hardcore punk, black metal
- Years active: 2002–2005
- Labels: DogJob; Bitzcore; Candlelight
- Past members: Casey Chaos; Samoth; Faust; Cosmocrator; Happy-Tom

Scum was a hardcore punk/black metal supergroup formed in 2002 with members from Amen, Emperor, Zyklon, and Turbonegro. All members are Norwegian except for American vocalist Casey Chaos. According to the band, their idea is to play "black metal with a real punk rock attitude".

== History ==
Scum was formed in 2002 by Casey Chaos, Samoth, Faust, Cosmocrator and Happy-Tom. Scum's debut album, Gospels for the Sick, was recorded in one single studio session in 2004 and released in September 2005. The band has performed live a handful of times, including an appearance at the Norwegian Øyafestivalen in 2005 and a performance at Camden Underworld in London. The band had guest appearances from several artists, one of which was Mortiis, who co-wrote and performed on the song "Speaking in Tongues", released in 2021.

Scum were known to be silent on indicating if the band were still active or whether they were working on new material. They ultimately did not release a follow up second album or reactivate as a band, and in December 2024 lead singer Casey Chaos died, effectively ending any chance of the band ever reuniting and releasing new material.

== Associated acts ==
Scum's band members have played in several other bands. Guitarist Samoth played in many bands including notable black metal bands like Emperor, Gorgoroth, Satyricon, Zyklon, Thou Shalt Suffer, Arcturus and Zyklon-B, and did sessions for Ildjarn and Burzum. Drummer Faust contributed to the music of Emperor, Aborym, Zyklon, Thorns and several less notable bands like Impostor, Blood Tsunami, Death Fuck, Decomposed Cunt and Stigma Diabolicum. Cosmocrator played for Windir, Zyklon, Source of Tide and Mindgrinder. Vocalist Casey Chaos writes and records everything apart from drums for his band, Amen, and also provides vocals for Damned Damned Damned and Grindhaller XXX. Happy-Tom plays bass guitar for Turbonegro.

== Members ==
- Casey Chaos (Karim Chmielinski) – vocals, mixing
- Samoth (Tomas Haugen) – guitar
- Cosmocrator (Andre Søgnen) – guitar
- Happy-Tom (Thomas Seltzer) – bass
- Faust (Bård Eithun) – drums

== Discography ==
- Gospels for the Sick (2005)
