= Rockefeller Oslo =

Concert venue in Oslo, Norway

- Interactive map of Rockefeller Oslo
- Location: Oslo, Norway
- Coordinates: 59°54′58″N 10°45′1″E
- Owner: Auditorium AS
- Capacity: 1,300
- Type: music venue
- Events: rock, pop

Construction
- Opened: 1986

Website
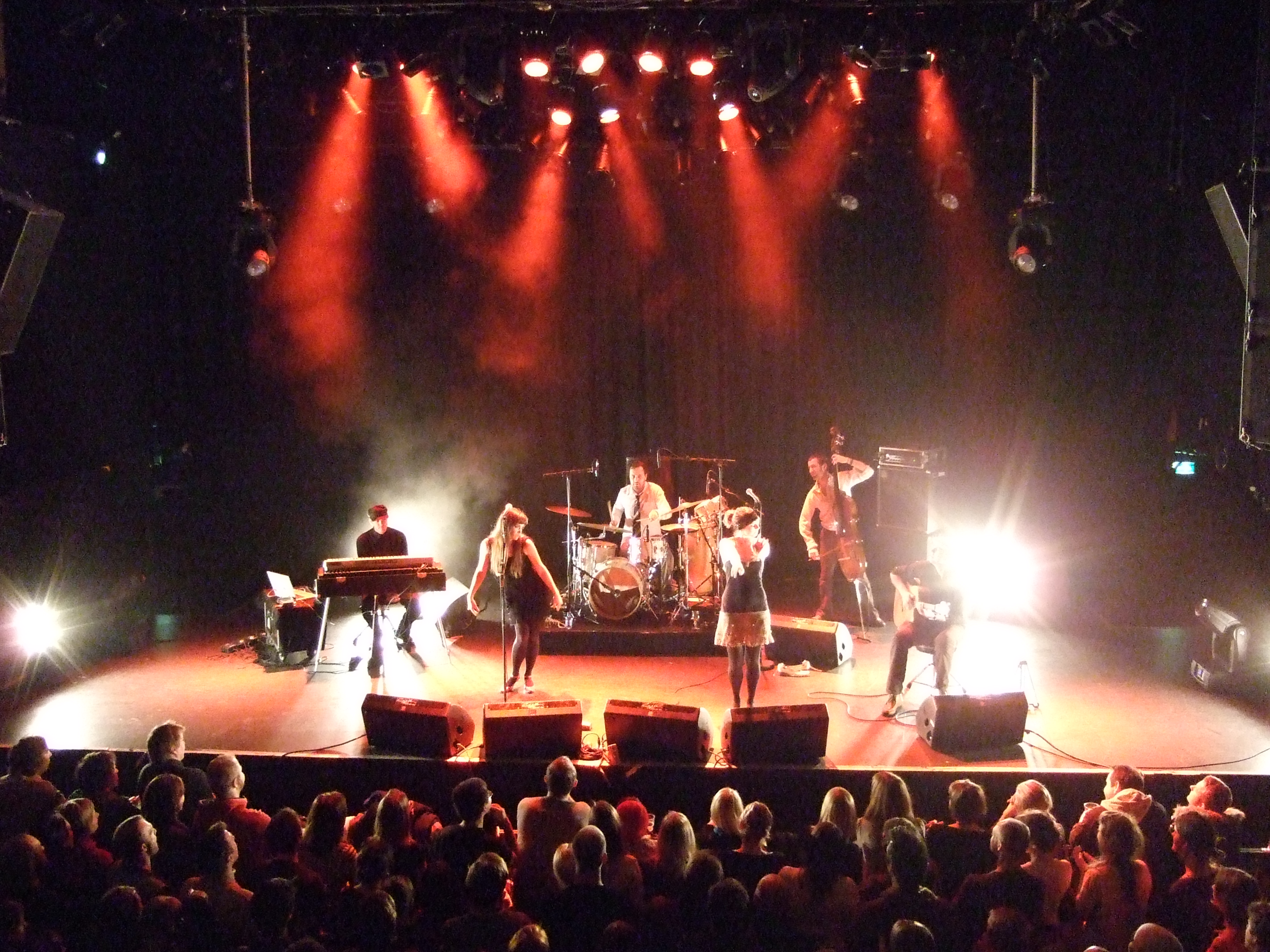
- Rockefeller – John Dee – Sentrum Scene French band Nouvelle Vague in concert at Rockefeller, 25 February 2007

Rockefeller is a concert venue with audience entrance at Mariboes gate 5B, downtown Oslo, Norway. The building, known as "Torggata Bad" ("Market Street Bath"), used to house a public bathing facility. To this day the surrounding floors of the building consists of Tilt Oslo, Oslo Streetfood and Oslo Bar & Bowling.

Rockefeller Oslo was established in 1986, and has a capacity of 1,300. Rockefeller is owned by Auditorium AS, of which also runs John Dee (pax 500), which is a smaller venue located in the lower floors of the same building complex. The company also owns a slightly bigger venue, Sentrum Scene (pax 1,750), located across the street at Arbeidersamfunnets Plass 1. Both Rockefeller, John Dee and Sentrum Scene are known for its high volume of concert events, very often involving pop and rock music, as well as cultural events with Norwegian and international artists such as the annual Inferno Festival, by:Larm and Musikkfest Oslo.

The venue consists of a main hall, a large gallery, a smaller upper gallery, a rooftop with bar, and several lounge bars across the sides of the main music hall.

Several popular podcasts are regularly recorded at Rockefeller, as well as public radio shows hosted by NRK, among others.

The Coldplay EP Trouble - Norwegian Live EP was recorded at the venue.
