= Lucifer Rising (Kaamos album) =

Studio album by Kaamos
- Released: 22 March 2005
- Recorded: April 2003 – March 2004, at Berno Studios in Malmö, Sweden
- Genre: Death metal
- Length: 38:05
- Label: Candlelight

Kaamos chronology
Kaamos (2002)	Lucifer Rising (2005)

Professional ratings
Review scores
Source	Rating
Allmusic	4.5/5 stars
LordsOfMetal	7/10 stars
Metal Archives	(9.4/10)
Metal Storm	8.5/10 stars
Metal-Temple	4/5 stars
Scream	4/6 stars

Lucifer Rising is the second album by the Swedish death metal band Kaamos. It was recorded at Berno Studios and released in 2005.

== Track listing ==
All tracks are written by Kaamos, except where noted.

2005 vinyl edition (Imperium Productions) Side one
No.	Title	Length
1.	"Black Revelation"	3:54
2.	"Gnosticon"	3:18
3.	"Inaugurating Evil"	4:52
4.	"Theriomorphic Pandemonium"	3:35
5.	"Dark Void"	3:17

Side two
No.	Title	Length
1.	"Lucifer Rising"	4:33
2.	"Sacrament in Red"	2:47
3.	"Mysterious Reversion"	4:54
4.	"Chthonic"	3:23
5.	"Outro: Ascent"	3:05

2005 CD edition
Same track listing and order as the vinyl release issued on one disc (Catalogue: Candlelight Records Candle091CD).

== Personnel ==
- Karl Envall – vocals, bass guitar
- Nicklas Eriksson – guitar
- Konstantin Papavassilou – guitar
- Cristofer Barkensjö (Chris Piss) – drums
