= Gnostikoi Ha-Shaitan =

Studio album by Saturnian Mist
- Released: 13 December 2011
- Recorded: December 2010 – February 2011
- Genre: Black metal, blackened death metal
- Length: 44:59
- Label: Ahdistuksen Aihio Productions
- Producer: Zetekh, Shu-Ananda

Saturnian Mist chronology
| Gnostikoi Ha-Shaitan (2011) | Chaos Magick (2015) |

Gnostikoi Ha-Shaitan is the first studio album by Finnish black metal band Saturnian Mist. It was recorded at three locations, Watercastle Studios, Desolate Star Studios and Ordo Templi Keliokis, during December 2010 - February 2011.

The title is combination of Hebrew and Ancient Greek and it loosely translates: "Those who are able to know the adversity". According to Metal Rules interview of the band's vocalist Zetekh "Adversity" refers here to an archetype of the Devil and "Gnostikoi" means "Those who are able to know", derivative from the works of Plato and the term Gnosis.

A music video was made from the album, from the track ”Aura Mystica” which was also serving as a directorial debut of Zetekh.

== Track listing ==
All lyrics written by fra. Zetekh except "Bythos In Quintessence" by le Sorcier and "The Watcher's Feast" by Johannes Nefastos. All music written by Saturnian Mist

| No. | Title | Length |
|---|---|---|
| 1. | "The Regicide" | 5:30 |
| 2. | "Bythos In Quintessence" | 5:17 |
| 3. | "Consecration Of The Temple" | 6:01 |
| 4. | "Temps-Des-Cranes" | 5:51 |
| 5. | "Sacrifice Of Faces Unbroken" | 5:33 |
| 6. | "The Watcher's Feast" | 4:56 |
| 7. | "Aura Mystica" | 5:58 |
| 8. | "Gnostikoi Ha-Shaitan" | 5:53 |

== Personnel ==
Saturnian Mist

- Zetekh - Lead & backing vocals
- Chaoswind - Lead guitars
- Shu-Ananda - Rhythm & solo guitar, clean vocals
- Ptahaz - Bass guitar
- Wyrmfang - Drums

Guest writers

- Johannes Nefastos (Lyrics for "The Watcher's Feast")
- le Sorcier (Lyrics for "Bythos In Quintessence")

Production

- H. Kivelä - Mixing, photography
- Zetekh - Producing, graphic illustrations and layouts
- Shu-Ananda - Producing
- Vesa-Antti Puumalainen - Cover art
- neuroscan.org - Mastering
