= Chaos Magick (album) =

Studio album by Saturnian Mist
- Released: 27 April 2015
- Recorded: March–September 2014; Blackvox Studio, Finland
- Genre: Black metal, blackened death metal
- Length: 52:44
- Label: Candlelight Records, Saturnal Records
- Producer: fra. Zetekh

Saturnian Mist chronology
Gnostikoi Ha-Shaitan (2011)	Chaos Magick (2015)

Chaos Magick is the second studio album by Finnish black metal band Saturnian Mist. It was recorded at the Blackvox Studio at Tampere, Finland in April–September 2014 and mastered at the Turan Audio in Oxford, UK by Tim Turan in October 2014.

Two music videos were made from the album, both directed and edited by fra. Zetekh. First one "The True Law" was released also as a single in December 2014 and the second music video was from the track "Bloodsoaked Chakrament".

The CD version was released by Candlelight Records on 27 April 2015; the vinyl version was released by Saturnal Records. The vinyl version does not include the track "Yoga, Hate, Fuck".

== Track listing ==
All lyrics written by fra. Zetekh except "Martial Theosis" by IC Rex and "White Void Of All-Being" by fra. Zetekh & Johannes Nefastos. All music written by Saturnian Mist

No.	Title	Length
1.	"612"	1:05
2.	"The Heart Of Shiva"	5:10
3.	"The True Law"	3:40
4.	"Root Of The Coiled Serpent"	4:43
5.	"Chaos Unchained"	4:22
6.	"Third Eye Contemplation"	3:41
7.	"Bloodsoaked Chakrament"	4:03
8.	"Chaos Magick"	4:26
9.	"Voodoo Satan"	2:14
10.	"Martial Theosis"	3:21
11.	"Evoking God"	4:11
12.	"White Void Of All-Being"	9:10
13.	"Yoga, Hate, Fuck"	2:38

== Personnel ==
Saturnian Mist

- fra. Zetekh - Vocals
- fra. Chaoswind - Lead & solo guitars
- fra. Ptahaz - Rhythm guitars
- fra. Macabrum - Bass guitars
- fra. Psychonaught - Percussions, synths & backing vocals
- fra. Vile - Drums

Guest writers

- Johannes Nefastos (Lyrics for "White Void Of All-Being")
- IC Rex (Lyrics for "Martial Theosis)

Production

- fra. Zetekh - Producing, Sound engineering, mixing, Cover layout
- fra. Ptahaz - Sound engineering
- Tim Turan - Mastering
- Vesa-Antti Puumalainen - Cover art
- Kristiina Lehto - Photography
