= Beyond the Gates (music festival) =

Annual music festival in Bergen, Norway

- Genre: Heavy metal, Extreme metal
- Dates: 2012–
- Locations: Bergen, Norway
- Website: https://www.beyondthegates.no

Beyond the Gates is a heavy metal festival focusing on extreme metal, held annually in August in Bergen, Norway. The festival was established following the discontinuation of Hole in the Sky, which was also held in Bergen in August. The first edition of Beyond the Gates was held in 2012.

The main stage is at USF Verftet, a former sardine factory converted into a cultural venue. Additional venues include Grieghallen, Kulturhuset, and the nightclub Stereo. In recent years, the festival has been a four-day event.

Like many other festivals and events, the 2020 edition was cancelled due to the COVID-19 pandemic.

== Festival activities ==
=== Beyond the Gates Experience ===
Like the Inferno Metal Festival in Oslo, the festival attracts an international audience. As a result, a range of daytime activities is offered in addition to the concert programme. These activities include discussion panels, listening sessions, mead tasting, and "Black Metal Landmarks"; a guided tour to sites significant to the metal scene and to Norwegian culture. Examples include Grieghallen, where several black metal albums by bands such as Enslaved, Immortal, and Mayhem were recorded with producer Eirik “Pytten” Hundvin. Other sites include the Lyse Abbey ruins, Fantoft Stave Church, locations associated with Mayhem, and the art gallery of Kristian Eivind “Gaahl” Espedal.

Beyond the Gates has received funding from the Research Council of Norway, which has supported research on the festival’s regional impact. Other supporters include Music Norway and Innovation Norway.

=== Beyond the Ink Tattoo Convention ===
During the festival, tattoo artists Jannicke Wiese-Hansen and Carmen "PG" Perez organize a tattoo convention held in connection with the festival. Wiese-Hansen has been a key figure in the black metal scene since the early 1990s, designing band logos, album covers, and posters.

== See also ==
- Inferno Metal Festival
- Hole in the Sky
- Midgardsblot
