= Myrkskog =

Norwegian death metal band

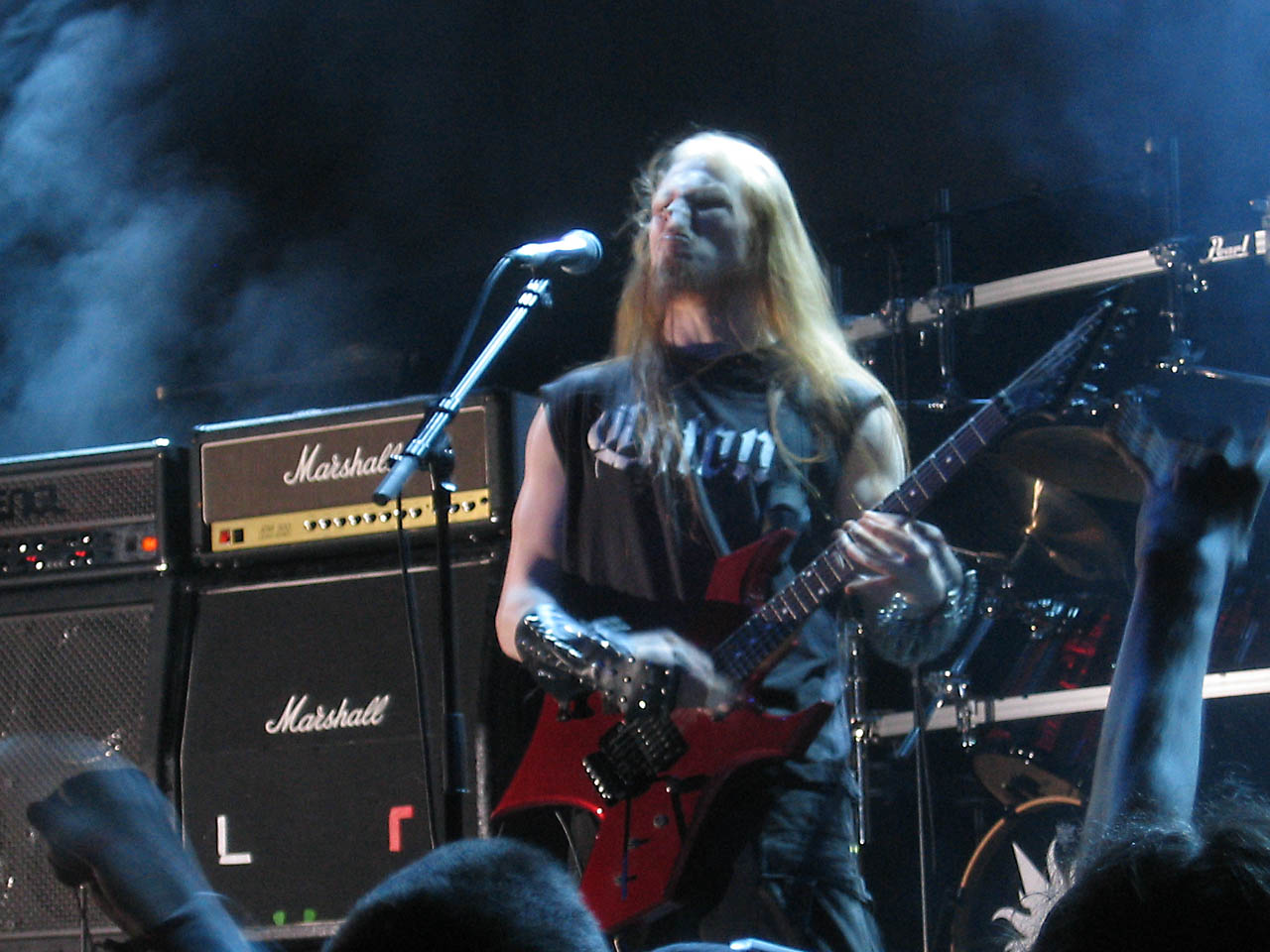

Background information
- Origin: Norway
- Genres: Death metal blackened death metal Extreme metal Black metal
- Years active: 1993–present
- Label: Candlelight

Myrkskog is a death metal band from Drammen, Norway, formed in 1993.

== History ==
Their music consists of high speed double-bass with rapid blastbeats and fills. Guitars use harmonic tremolo picking and sometimes power chords with fast solos by Destructhor who, with Secthdamon, were in Zyklon. Their debut album, Deathmachine, is a black metal / death metal hybrid. Their second album, Superior Massacre, is more death metal-oriented with prominent bass-lines and fewer tremolo picked riffs.

The name 'Myrkskog' is a translation of the Norwegian word for 'Mirkwood'. Destructhor joined Morbid Angel in 2008 and departed in 2015. Secthdamon is a live member for Emperor since 2005.

The current line-up is guitarist/vocalist Destructhor, guitarist/backing vocalist Secthdamon, bassist Demariel (or Gortheon), and drummer Dominator. Secthdamon changed from drums to guitar in 2013. Myrkskog has released two full-length albums through UK's Candlelight Records. Their second studio album, Superior Massacre, contains material by Norwegian experimental duo Epilektrician as intro and outro. According to the band's official Instagram page, they were recording material for a third album, which would be band’s first new material released in over 20 years.

== Members ==
=== Current members ===
- Destructhor - guitars (1993–present), lead vocals (2001–present)
- Secthdamon (Tony Ingebrigtsen) - guitars, backing vocals (1996-1997, 2013–present); drums (1997–2013)
- Gortheon - bass (2001–present)
- Dominator (Nils Fjellström) - drums (2013–present)

=== Former members ===
- Master V - bass, lead vocals (1993-2001)
- Lars Petter - drums (1993-1994)
- Bjørn Thomas - drums (1994-1995)
- Anders Eek - drums (1996-1997)

Timeline

== Discography ==
- Ode til Norge - (1995, demo)
- Apocalyptic Psychotica - The Murder Tape - (1998, demo)
- Deathmachine - (2000, Candlelight Records)
- Superior Massacre - (2002, Candlelight Records)
