= Zyklon-B (band) =

Norwegian black metal band

- Origin: Norway
- Genre: Black metal
- Years active: 1995–1999
- Label: Malicious Records
- Formerly of: Zyklon, Satyricon, Emperor, Dødheimsgard
- Members: Frost; Samoth; Ihsahn; Aldrahn

Zyklon-B was a Norwegian black metal supergroup founded in 1995.

== History ==
The band's members were Tomas "Samoth" Thormodsæter Haugen (guitar and bass) and Vegard "Ihsahn" Sverre Tveitan (keyboard) from Emperor, Kjetil "Frost" Haraldstad (drums) from Satyricon and Björn "Aldrahn" Dencker Gjerde (vocals) from Dødheimsgard. Their lyrics mainly dealt with death, apocalypse and warfare. The band recorded only one EP; other versions of the songs contained therein appeared on split releases with Mayhem and Swordmaster.

The band Zyklon, featuring members of Zyklon-B, is often incorrectly thought to be the same band. The name refers to Zyklon B, a gas used in gas chambers during the Holocaust. Despite the name, the band states that "Zyklon-B is not related to any political or racial preference".

== Discography ==
- Blood Must Be Shed EP (1995)
- Blood Must Be Shed / Wraths of Time split EP with Swordmaster (1996)
- Necrolust / Total Warfare split single with Mayhem (1999)
