= Lost Eden (band) =

Japanese band

- Origin: Aichi, Japan
- Genres: Melodic death metal black metal (early)
- Years active: 2000–2009
- Labels: Candlelight Records
- Members: Norio; Adachi; Run; Daisuke; Masahide
- Past members: Chang; Sensyu; Cab; Mako

Lost Eden was a Japanese melodic death metal band. Forming in 2000, they released their first album Cycle Repeats on Candlelight Records in 2006 and has since gained international attention. The band split in 2009.

== History ==
The band was formed in 2000 with Norio, Adachi, Run, Daisuke, and former drummer Chang.

After much practice, in 2002, two of their songs were put on a Japanese compilation album, SURPLUS SUPPRESSION 3.

In the spring of 2003, a new member, Sensyu, joined as their new drummer, and Chang became the band's new guitarist. Now with three guitarists in the band, they released their debut 4-track EP titled SEWN MOUTH FOREST and experimented with black metal and hardcore punk. Following the release, they went on a national tour.

In 2004, another song was put on a compilation album, METAL OSTENTATION Vol.6. Despite their moderate success, Chang decided to leave the band. The band hired new member, Cab, as guitarist. Due to this new line up change, the band decided to experiment more with a melodic death metal sound.

In 2005, the band, once again, found songs on compilation albums EARTHQUAKE A.G.M and EXTREME GENERATION. Despite the success, Cab left the band. Soon after, Mako joined the group as a guitarist. This left them back to a two-guitarist band. In the winter of the same year, the band recorded a 2-track demo. This led to even more experimentation using keyboards.

The band sent their demo to Candlelight Records, a London-based metal label. Early on in 2006, the band signed a contract with them and began to work on their debut album Cycle Repeats which has since been released.

In 2009 the band split and Norio and Mako went on to form a new band called Each of the Days.

== Members ==
- Norio – vocalist (2000–2009)
- Adachi – guitarist (2000–2009)
- Run – guitarist (2000–2009)
- Daisuke – bassist (2000–2009)
- Masahide – drummer (2006–2009)

== Former members ==
- Chang – drummer/guitarist (2000–2004)
- Sensyu – guitarist (2003–unknown)
- Cab – guitarist (2004–2005)
- Mako – drummer (2004–2006)

== Discography ==
=== Demos ===
- 2006 – Untitled demo (self-released)

=== EPs ===
- 2003 – Sewn Mouth Forest (self-released)

=== Albums ===
- March 20, 2007 – Cycle Repeats (Candlelight Records)
