= Andrea Haugen =

German singer (1969–2021)

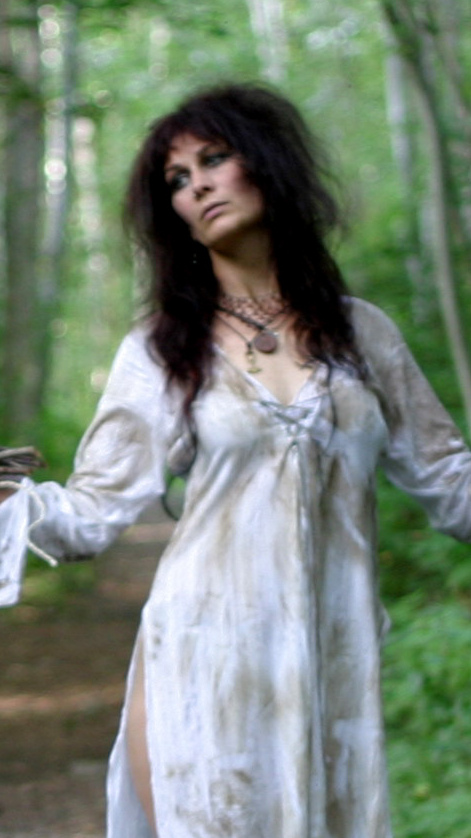
- Haugen modelling as Nebelhexë in 2003

Background information
- Also known as: Aghast, Hagalaz' Runedance, Andréa Nebel, Nebel, Nebelhexë
- Born: Andréa Meyer; 6 July 1969; Hannover, Germany
- Died: 13 October 2021 (aged 52) Kongsberg, Norway
- Genres: Rock; ambient; electronic; industrial; black metal
- Occupations: Musician; model; writer; actress
- Instruments: Vocals; synthesizer; drums; percussion; recorder
- Years active: 1994–2021

Andrea Haugen (born Andréa Meyer; 6 July 1969 – 13 October 2021), also known under her artist names of Aghast, Hagalaz' Runedance, Andréa Nebel, Nebel and Nebelhexë, was a German musician, model and author.

== Career ==
=== Modelling ===
Haugen worked as a model in London, but soon rejected it as a "shallow scene". She was later a fetish model and participated in Cradle of Filth shows.

=== Music ===
Haugen has cited her influences as the Cocteau Twins, Kate Bush, and The Benedictine Monks of Santo Domingo de Silos. She released her first music as Aghast in 1995, then from 1996 to 2002 under the name Hagalaz' Runedance. From 2003 she worked under the name of Nebelhexë, releasing three further albums, and also used the name Andréa Nebel and released electronic horror-mood music as Aghast Manor.

=== Writing ===
Haugen began writing in 1995. She wrote film scripts, both horror and satire. Many of her social-critical comments were printed in alternative magazines and also in Norwegian tabloids and magazines; she had a column titled "Seriously - The Things That Irritate Nebelhexë" in a Norwegian gothic magazine. She published an e-book titled Simply Exceptional – How to make it your Way!.

She also wrote Gothic and surreal poetry, and in 2011 released a spoken word CD to accompany her poetry anthology The Dark Side of Dreaming.

A pagan, originally with Anton LaVey's Church of Satan and later an earth-centred Germanic pagan, Haugen criticised what she viewed as patriarchal religions that inhibit people's inner nature. She published a book about Germanic spirituality and mythology, Die alten Feuer von Midgard (English edition The Ancient Fires of Midgard).

In a 2012 interview, Haugen expressed frustration at some journalists's insistence with finding out and claiming to know the "correct" interpretation of her songs, and named particular cases of some journalists stating that her songs thematised "witches in the woods, nature, Nazism and environmental pollution", when she intended for the songs in question to "very clearly" be about "incest, a friend's suicide, child abuse and loneliness".

== Personal life and death ==
Haugen was previously married to guitarist Tomas Haugen; they had a daughter.

She lived in the United Kingdom and Norway; she was living in Kongsberg when she was murdered at the age of 52 in the Kongsberg attacks on 13 October 2021.

== Discography ==
=== Aghast ===
- Hexerei im Zwielicht der Finsternis, CD/PD 1995

=== Hagalaz' Runedance ===
- When the Trees Were Silenced, 7" 1996
- The Winds That Sang of Midgard’s Fate, CD 1998
- Urd – That Which Was, MCD/Picture disc 1999
- On Wings of Rapture, CD single 2000
- Volven, CD/LP/Picture disc 2000
- Frigga’s Web, CD/LP 2002

=== Nebelhexë ===
- Laguz – Within the Lake, CD 2004
- Essensual, CD 2006
- Dead Waters, CD 2009
- Don't Kill The Animals, EP, 2009, with US artist Jarboe

=== Andréa Nebel ===
- The Dark Side Of Dreaming, CD 2011

=== Aghast Manor ===
- Gaslights, CD 2012
- Penetrate, CD 2013

=== Guest appearances ===
- Cradle of Filth – The Principle of Evil Made Flesh 1994 (credited as 'Andrea Meyer').
- Satyricon – Nemesis Divina 1996

== Bibliography ==
- Understanding the Northern Myths and Traditions (2000)
- Dark Side of Dreaming – poems and short stories
- Walking With The Night – a book of shadows
- Feed My Shadow Nature
- Simply Exceptional
- The Shadow Of Eloise
- The Neighbour
- The Body In The Skeleton House
- Behind Church Walls
- Das Erbe der Familie Rimbaud

== See also ==
- Neopagan music
