= Face Down (band) =

Swedish heavy metal band

- Origin: Stockholm, Sweden
- Genres: Groove metal; thrash metal; death metal
- Years active: 1993–1999, 2004–2011
- Labels: Roadrunner, Nuclear Blast, Black Lodge
- Members: Marco Aro; Christofer Barkensjö; Rickard Dahlberg; Joakim Hedestedt
- Past members: Henrik Blomquist; Joacim Carlsson; Rickard Bång; Peter Stjärnvind; Erik Thyselius

Face Down (formerly known as Machine God) was a Swedish heavy metal band from Stockholm, founded in 1993. They disbanded in 1999 and reformed in 2004. The latest formation consisted of singer Marco Aro (currently of The Resistance and The Haunted), drummer Christofer Barkensjö (formerly of Kaamos and Blackshine), guitarist Rickard Dahlberg (Construcdead), and bassist Joakim Hedestedt. Their final album, The Will to Power, was produced by Jocke Skog and released in November 2005, entering the Swedish hard rock chart at number 19. The band is currently on an indefinite hiatus.

== Members ==
- Marco Aro – vocals (1993–1999; 2004–2011)
- Joakim Hedestedt – bass (1993–1999; 2004–2011)
- Christofer Barkensjö – drums (2006–2011)
- Rickard Dahlberg – guitars (2007–2011)

=== Former members ===
- Alex Linder – guitars (1993–1994)
- Niklas Ekstrand – guitars (1994–1995)
- Henrik Blomquist – audio warfare (1994–1996)
- Joacim Carlsson – guitars (1994–1999; 2004–2007)
- Richard Bång – drums (1993–1995)
- Peter Stjärnvind – drums (1995–1997)
- Håkan Ericsson – drums (1997–1999)
- Erik Thyselius – drums (2004–2006)

== Discography ==
- One Eyed Man (demo, 1994)
- Mindfield (1995)
- The Twisted Rule the Wicked (1997)
- The Will to Power (2005)
