= Faust (musician) =

Norwegian drummer (born 1974)

Bård Eithun
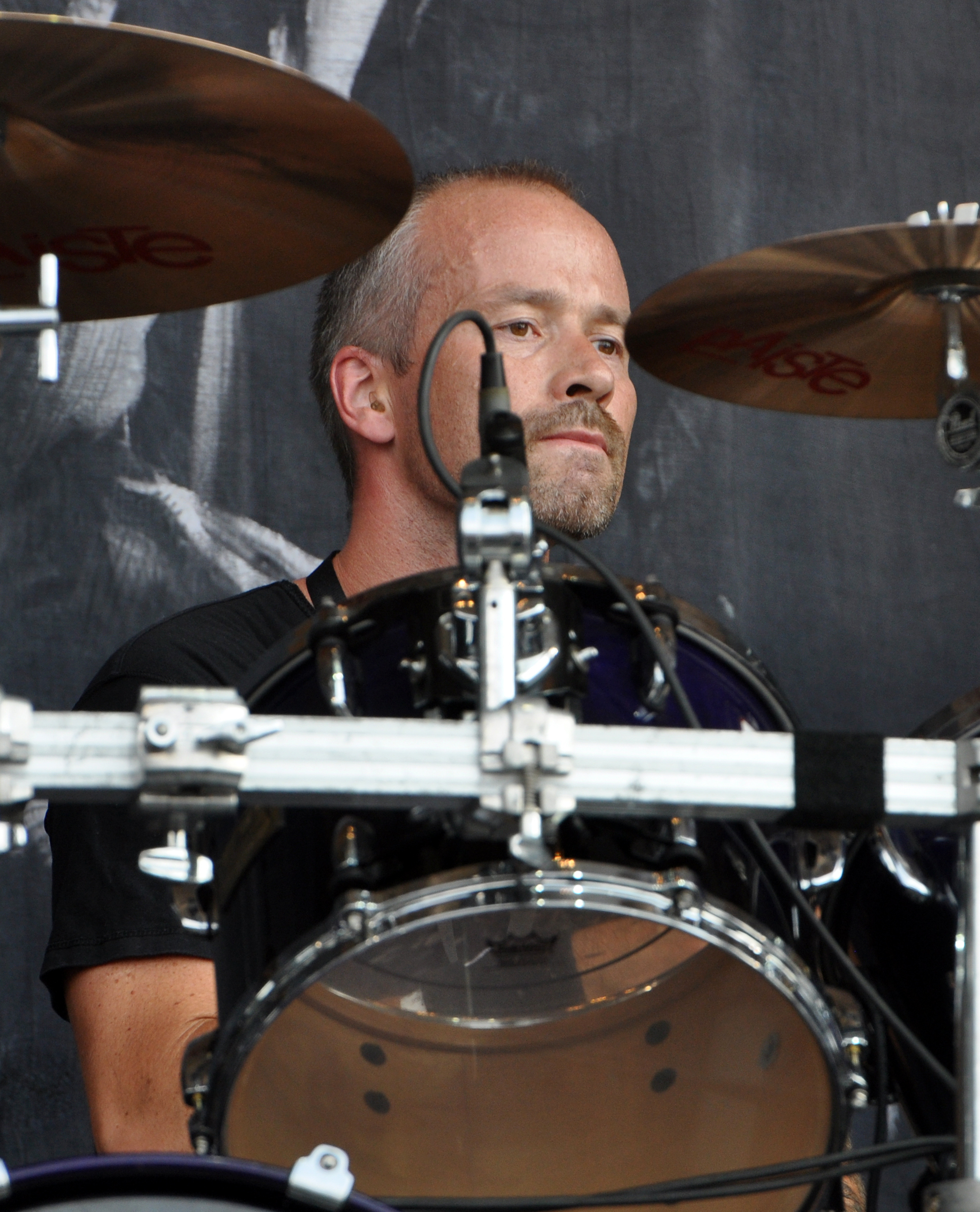
- Faust performing in 2014

Background information
- Also known as: Faust
- Born: Bård Guldvik Eithun; 21 April 1974 (age 52); Hedmark, Norway
- Genres: Black metal; thrash metal; hardcore punk
- Occupation: Drummer
- Years active: 1989–1994, 2003–present
- Member of: Blood Tsunami; Scum; Djevel; Galgeberg; Studfaust
- Formerly of: Emperor; Thorns; Aborym; Bomberos; Mongo Ninja

Bård Guldvik "Faust" Eithun (born 21 April 1974) is a Norwegian musician, best known as the drummer of black metal band Emperor. A prominent member of the early Norwegian black metal scene, Eithun was sentenced to 14 years in prison for murder and church arson in 1994. He was released in 2003 and has since continued performing as a drummer for Emperor, Djevel, Blood Tsunami, Aborym and Scum. Eithun won the Norwegian Spellemann Award in the Metal category with Djevel in 2022.

== Biography ==
=== Early years ===
Eithun was born on 21 April 1974 in Hedmark. At age sixteen, he moved to Lillehammer and became the drummer of Thorns, then-known as Stigma Diabolicum. Eithun published the underground fanzine Orcustus in the early 1990s. In 1992, he moved to Oslo and started working in Øystein "Euronymous" Aarseth's shop Helvete, having been pen-pals with the Mayhem guitarist since 1987. Eithun joined Emperor as a drummer that same year and became a part of the inner circle of the early Norwegian black metal scene.

=== Conviction and release ===
On 21 August 1992, while visiting his family in Lillehammer, Eithun encountered Magne Andreassen, a gay man. According to Eithun, while walking home from a pub through the Olympic park, Andreassen drunkenly approached him and solicited him for sex. Eithun agreed and followed him to the nearby woods and stabbed Andreassen 37 times, while also repeatedly stomping on the victim's head. Upon returning to Oslo the following day, he told Aarseth, Varg Vikernes, and a few other members of the black metal scene what he had done. Eithun, Aarseth and Vikernes later burned down Holmenkollen Chapel together. After Vikernes' murder of Aarseth in August 1993, Eithun was arrested and confessed to killing Andreassen on impulse. In early 1994, Emperor released their debut album, In the Nightside Eclipse. Later that year, Eithun was sentenced to 14 years imprisonment and subsequently left Emperor, with the imprisonment to happen at Ullersmo. He testified against Vikernes in the latter's murder and arson trial that same year. Although media had linked Eithun's murder to black metal and speculated he was motivated by Satanism, fascism, or homophobia, he has later denied being a satanist and having racist, fascist or homophobic views in several interviews. Singer Gaahl, an openly gay member of the Norwegian black metal scene, stated that Eithun was the first person to send him a message of support when he came out.

While incarcerated, Eithun completed two bachelor degrees at the University of Oslo in the history of religions and the history of ideas, in addition to studying a year of E-business at a private school in Oslo.

Though not an official member, Eithun became the main lyricist of blackened death metal band Zyklon in 2001, and also contributed lyrics to albums released by Sigh and Wurdulak. He joined the hardcore punk/black metal supergroup Scum the following year.

In 2003, Eithun was released from prison due to good behavior after serving nine years and four months. Of his incarceration, Eithun said: "It has taught me a lot about myself, my limits, my psyche and my will. I think it as a positive thing that I was removed from the black metal scene because I was heading towards a very destructive path." In later interviews, Eithun has expressed remorse for his actions in the 1990s and called them senseless.

=== Later career ===
Following his release, Eithun was interviewed for the black metal documentary Until the Light Takes Us, later released in 2008. Eithun was announced as Swedish extreme metal band Dissection's new drummer in 2003, but departed the band that same year due to ideological differences. Scum released their first album, Gospels for the Sick, in 2005. Eithun joined thrash metal band Blood Tsunami and industrial black metal band Aborym that same year. He released his first album with Aborym as a member the following year, having previously contributed lyrics to the band. Blood Tsunami released their debut album, Thrash Metal, in 2007. Eithun joined punk/metal band Mongo Ninja in 2009 and released three albums with the band before their disbandment in 2012. From 2012, to 2014, he released two EPs with the punk/metal band Studfaust.

In 2013, Eithun returned to Emperor as drummer for the 20th anniversary tour of In the Nightside Eclipse in the summer of 2014, which included a performance at Wacken Open Air. He departed Aborym in 2014 after releasing three studio albums with the band. In 2017, Eithun was announced as the new drummer for black metal band Djevel. On 23 May 2021, Eithun appeared as a guest at Emperor's show at Notodden Theatre marking the 30th anniversary of their formation. In 2022, Djevel won the Norwegian Spellemann Award in the Metal category for the album Tanker som rir natten, released the previous year. On August 1, 2026, he once again reunited with Emperor during their headlining performance at Beyond the Gates festival in Norway.

== Discography ==
=== With Emperor ===
Studio albums

- In the Nightside Eclipse (1994)

EPs

- Wrath of the Tyrant (1992)
- Emperor (1993)
- As the Shadows Rise (1994)

Compilation albums

- Emperial Vinyl Presentation (2001)
- Scattered Ashes: A Decade of Emperial Wrath (2003)
- Emperor: The Complete Works (2017)

=== With Scum ===
Studio albums

- Gospels for the Sick (2005)

=== With Blood Tsunami ===
Studio albums

- Thrash Metal (2007)
- Grand Feast for Vultures (2009)
- For Faen! (2013)
- Grave Condition (2018)

EPs

- Castle of Skulls (2009)

=== With Aborym ===
Studio albums

- Generator (2006)
- Psychogrotesque (2010)
- Dirty (2013)

=== With Mongo Ninja ===
Studio albums

- ...And the Wrist Is History (2009)
- No Cunt for Old Men (2010)
- Nocturnal Neanderthals (2011)

=== With Studfaust ===
EPs

- Half Human, Half Dynamite / 1980's Ladies (2012)
- Where the Underdogs Bark (2014)

=== With Djevel ===
Studio albums

- Blant svarte graner (2018)
- Ormer til armer, maane til hode (2019)
- Tanker som rir natten (2021)
- Naa skrider natten sort (2022)
- Natt til ende (2024)

=== Lyrical, vocal and instrumental credits ===
Year	Artist	Title	Song(s)	Notes
2000	Ulver	Perdition City	"The Future Sound of Music"	Drums
2001	Emperor	A Tribute to Mayhem: Originators of the Northern Darkness	"Funeral Fog"	Drums
2001	SiriuS	Spectral Transition - Dimension SiriuS	"Spectral Transition", "Spiritual Metamorphosis"	Vocal samples
2001	SiriuS	Spectral Transition - Dimension SiriuS	"Dimensional Quantum", "The Majesty of the Nightsky"	Drums
2001	Cadaver Inc.	Discipline	"Kill Tech"	Spoken passage
2001	Sigh	Imaginary Sonicscape	"Nietzschean Conspiracy"	Lyrics
2001	Wurdulak	Ceremony in Flames	"Containment of Inferno"	Lyrics
2001	Zyklon	World ov Worms		Lyrics
2003	Aborym	With No Human Intervention	"With No Human Intervention", "Faustian Spirit of the Earth"	Lyrics, spoken words
2003	Disiplin	Disiplin	"Strategy Formulation"	Lyrics, spoken words
2003	Zyklon	Aeon		Lyrics
2006	Zyklon	Disintegrate		Lyrics
2009	Fenriz' Red Planet/Nattefrost	Engangsgrill	"Nekronaut II Nekro Spirituals", "Humiliated and Pissed Upon"	Drums
2010	The Wretched End	Ominous	"Of Men and Wolves", "Numbered Days", "With Ravenous Hunger", "Residing in Limbo"	Lyrics
2010	Zyklon	The Storm Manifesto		Lyrics

== In popular culture ==
Eithun was portrayed by Valter Skarsgård in the 2018 biographical horror-thriller film Lords of Chaos.

== Bibliography ==
- Orcustus, underground zine published by Eithun in the early 1990s.

== Sources ==
- Moynihan, Michael; Søderlind, Didrik (2003). Lords of chaos : the bloody rise of the satanic metal underground (New ed.). Port Townsend, Washington: Feral House. ISBN 0-922915-94-6.
