= Zyklon =

Norwegian blackened death metal band

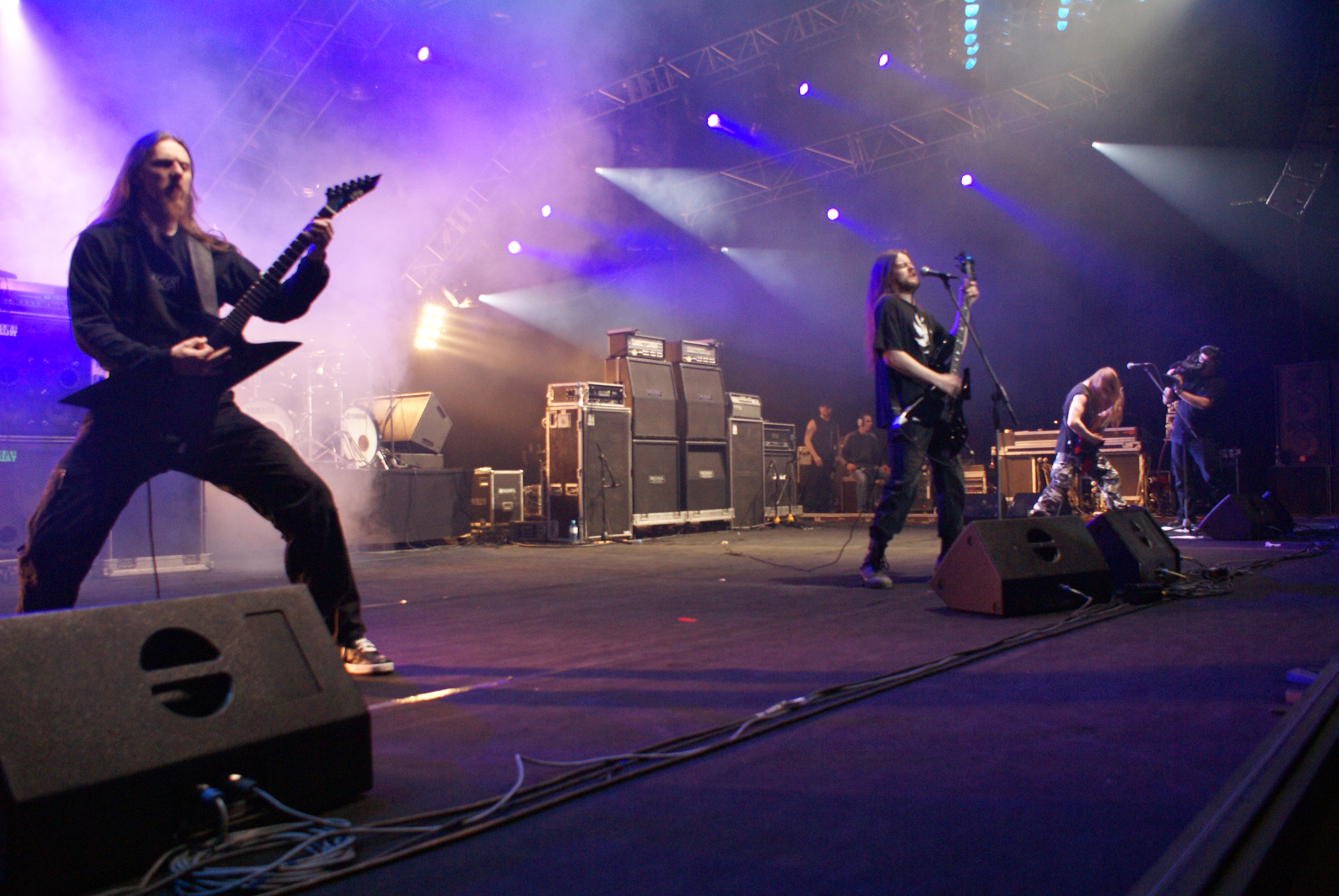
- Zyklon during Metalmania 2007, Katowice, Poland

Background information
- Origin: Norway
- Genres: Blackened death metal
- Years active: 1998–2010
- Labels: Candlelight
- Formerly of: Emperor, Zyklon-B, Scum, Myrkskog, Aborym
- Members: Secthdamon; Samoth; Destructhor; Trym Torson
- Past members: Daemon; Cosmocrator

Zyklon was a Norwegian blackened death metal band formed in 1998 by Samoth and Trym of Emperor, along with members of Myrkskog. Their style has been described as modern death metal with black and industrial undertones. After more than a two-year hiatus, the band officially split up in January 2010.

All the band's lyrics were written by former Emperor drummer Faust, then member of Casey Chaos' side project Scum and Italian industrial black metal band Aborym.

Despite Samoth having been in a previous Emperor side project called Zyklon-B, the two are not related; Zyklon B is the name of a lethal gas used by the Nazis during the Holocaust; "Zyklon" is, according to Samoth, a play on the word "cyclone", since the word is spelled syklon in Norwegian.

== History ==
Zyklon's debut album, World ov Worms (2001), showcased fast riffing and blast beats. However, after this release, Zyklon's line-up changed drastically, and the official line-up became Samoth, Trym Torson, Destructhor, and Secthdamon.

The band's second album, Aeon (2003), exposed the band to media attention, and videos were made for two tracks, "Core Solution" and "Psyklon Aeon".

The band's third effort was recorded from November to December 2005 at the Akkerhaugen Lydstudio in Norway; Disintegrate was released in May 2006. In October 2007, the band went on hiatus, before splitting up 15 months later.

== Members ==
=== Last line-up ===
- Secthdamon – vocals, bass (2001–2010)
- Samoth – guitar (1998–2010)
- Destructhor – guitar (1998–2010)
- Trym – drums (1998–2010)

=== Former members ===
- Daemon – vocals (1998–2001)
- Cosmocrator – bass (live 2001)

== Discography ==
- World ov Worms (2001)
- Aeon (2003)
- Split with Red Harvest (CD, 2003)
- Disintegrate (2006)
- The Storm Manifesto (compilation of all previous recorded works) (CD, 2010)

=== DVDs ===
- Storm Detonation Live (2006)

=== Music videos ===
- "Psyklon Aeon"
- "Core Solution"
