= Trym Torson =

Norwegian drummer

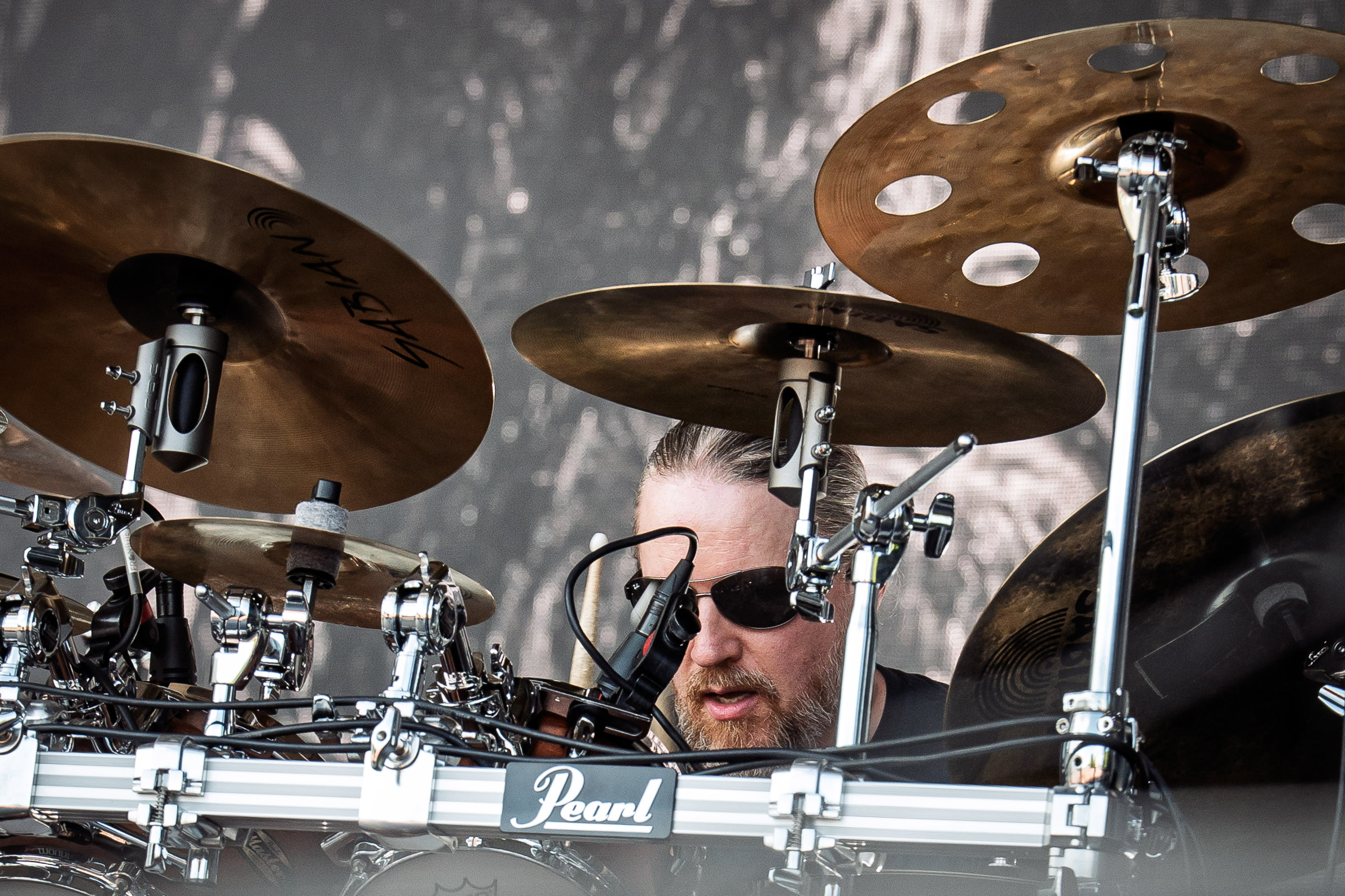
- Trym Torson in 2025

Background information
- Also known as: Trym Torson
- Born: Kai Johnny Mosaker; 1974 (age 51–52)
- Genres: Symphonic black metal, black metal, progressive metal, death metal, heavy metal, industrial metal
- Occupation: Drummer

Kai Johnny Mosaker (born 1974), known professionally as Trym Torson or mononymously as simply Trym, is a Norwegian drummer, formerly with Zyklon. Torson started playing in the extreme metal band Enslaved and was later invited to play in black metal band Emperor. He co-founded Zyklon together with Emperor member Samoth. His style is heavily influenced by jazz, and he is known for his fast playing, often consisting of blast beats and double-bass drumming. He is also a tattoo artist.

In 2007, Torson lent his voice to an animated character from the Adult Swim cartoon Metalocalypse, in the episode "Dethfashion". He also played on Egyptian artist Nader Sadek's Faceless project, contributing drums on the song Faithless written by Steve Tucker. Torson recorded most of the drums on the Abigail Williams album In the Shadow of a Thousand Suns.

Trym is most recently dabbling in filmmaking as a producer and actor. He began production on a feature film in April 2012, with his longtime friend, Stacy Paul Rugely, an established filmmaker and musician himself.

== Bands ==
Current and former bands

- Emperor
- Enslaved
- Imperium
- Satyricon – live session (2004)
- Shadow Season
- Paganize
- Ceremony (US death metal band)
- Zyklon
- Abigail Williams
- Þrymr (solo project)
