= Candlelight Records =

British record label

- Parent company: Spinefarm Music Group / Universal Music Group (since 2016)
- Founded: 1993
- Founder: Lee Barrett
- Status: Active
- Distributors: Plastic Head (Europe, 2001–2016); Virgin Music Label & Artist Services (US, 2001–2016); Universal Music & Video Distribution (2016–2022); PIAS Group (2023–present)
- Genre: Extreme metal
- Country of origin: England
- Location: London, England
- Official website: candlelightrecords.co.uk

Candlelight Records is a British record label based in London, founded by former Extreme Noise Terror bass guitarist Lee Barrett in 1993. The record label originally specialized in black metal, but quickly expanded to various other forms of heavy metal, extreme metal and hard rock, including death metal and melodic death metal, thrash metal, symphonic metal, metalcore, gothic rock, post-rock and post-metal.

Some of the company's flagship bands include Emperor, 1349, Blut Aus Nord, Ihsahn, Opeth, Christian Death, Orange Goblin, Winterfylleth, Zyklon, Abigail Williams, Insomnium, Havok, Obituary, Nachtmystium and Limbonic Art.

In January 2001, Candlelight Records launched an American division, Candlelight Records USA, headquartered in Schwenksville, Pennsylvania, and administered by Paula Hogan. In 2002, Barrett sold Candlelight Records to Edward Christie and Steve Beatty, and went on to form the Earache Records imprint Elitist Records (which only lasted three years, folding in 2005). In 2004, the company set up a licensing deal with Back on Black Records (also owned by Beatty) to release its titles on vinyl in the United Kingdom, and later (in 2006), in North America.

In December 2003, Candlelight Records USA signed a licensing deal to handle the North American manufacturing, distribution and sales of Dutch record label Karmageddon Media. Similar licensing and distribution agreements were later signed with American record label Arctic Music Group in February 2004, Norwegian record label Tabu Recordings in March 2004, Swedish record label Threeman Recordings in April 2004, English record label Rise Above Records and French record label Appease Me Records (owned by members of Blut Aus Nord), both in November 2004, Swedish record label Regain Records in February 2005, Norwegian record label Nocturnal Art Productions (for worldwide distribution) in May 2005, German record label AFM Records in June 2005, and American record label Willowtip Records (for European distribution) in August 2007.

In January 2016, Christie and Beatty sold Candlelight Records' assets to Finnish company Spinefarm Music Group (which also houses Spinefarm Records, Spikefarm Records and Snakefarm Records), which itself has been owned by Universal Music Group since 2002. As such, Candlelight Records became an affiliate of Universal Music Group, and has since been managed by Spinefarm Records' Dante Bonutto. In December 2022, Universal Music Group announced that all Spinefarm Music Group record labels would be distributed worldwide by PIAS Group, starting January 2023.

== Artists ==
=== Candlelight UK ===
- 1349
- Abaddon Incarnate
- Abduction
- Abigail Williams
- The Atlas Moth
- Age of Silence
- Anaal Nathrakh
- Averse Sefira
- Blut Aus Nord
- Burning the Oppressor
- Carnal Forge
- Crionics
- Crowbar
- Dam
- Daylight Dies
- Defiance
- Earthtone9
- Emperor
- Epoch of Unlight
- Forest Stream
- Grimfist
- Ihsahn
- Illdisposed
- Imperial Vengeance
- Insomnium
- Kaamos
- Lost Eden
- Manes
- Myrkskog
- Nebelhexe
- Novembers Doom
- Nuclear
- Octavia Sperati
- October File
- Omnium Gatherum
- Onslaught
- Pantheon I
- PSOTY
- Sear Bliss
- Saturnian Mist
- Savage Messiah
- Sigh
- Starkweather
- Stonegard
- Subterranean Masquerade
- Thine Eyes Bleed
- To-Mera
- Voices
- Winterfylleth
- Wodensthrone
- Wolverine
- Xerath
- Zyklon

=== Candlelight USA ===
See for Candlelight UK, but also:

- Absu
- Aeternus
- Amoral
- Audrey Horne
- Bal-Sagoth
- Battered
- Bronx Casket Co.
- Candlemass
- Centinex
- Dark Funeral
- Demonic Resurrection
- Destruction
- Dismember
- Electric Wizard
- Elvenking
- Attila Csihar
- Enslaved
- Entombed
- Fear Factory (2009–2012)
- Firebird
- Gorgoroth
- Grand Magus
- Havok
- Hevein
- Jorn
- Keep of Kalessin
- Khold
- Kotipelto
- Krieg
- Lord Belial
- Marduk
- Masterplan
- Morbid Angel
- Necrophobic
- Obituary
- Odious Mortem
- Opeth
- Overmars
- Pro-Pain
- The Project Hate MCMXCIX
- Ram-Zet
- Rob Rock
- Sahg
- Sarah Jezebel Deva
- Satariel
- SCUM
- Setherial
- Seven Witches
- Shakra
- sHEAVY
- Sothis
- Sinister
- Sourvein
- Spektr
- Susperia
- Taint
- Theatre of Tragedy
- Thyrane
- Thyrfing
- Time Requiem
- U.D.O.
- Vader
- Vision of Disorder
- Vreid
- Whitechapel
- Windir
- Witchcraft

== See also ==
- Lists of record labels
