= Static-X discography =

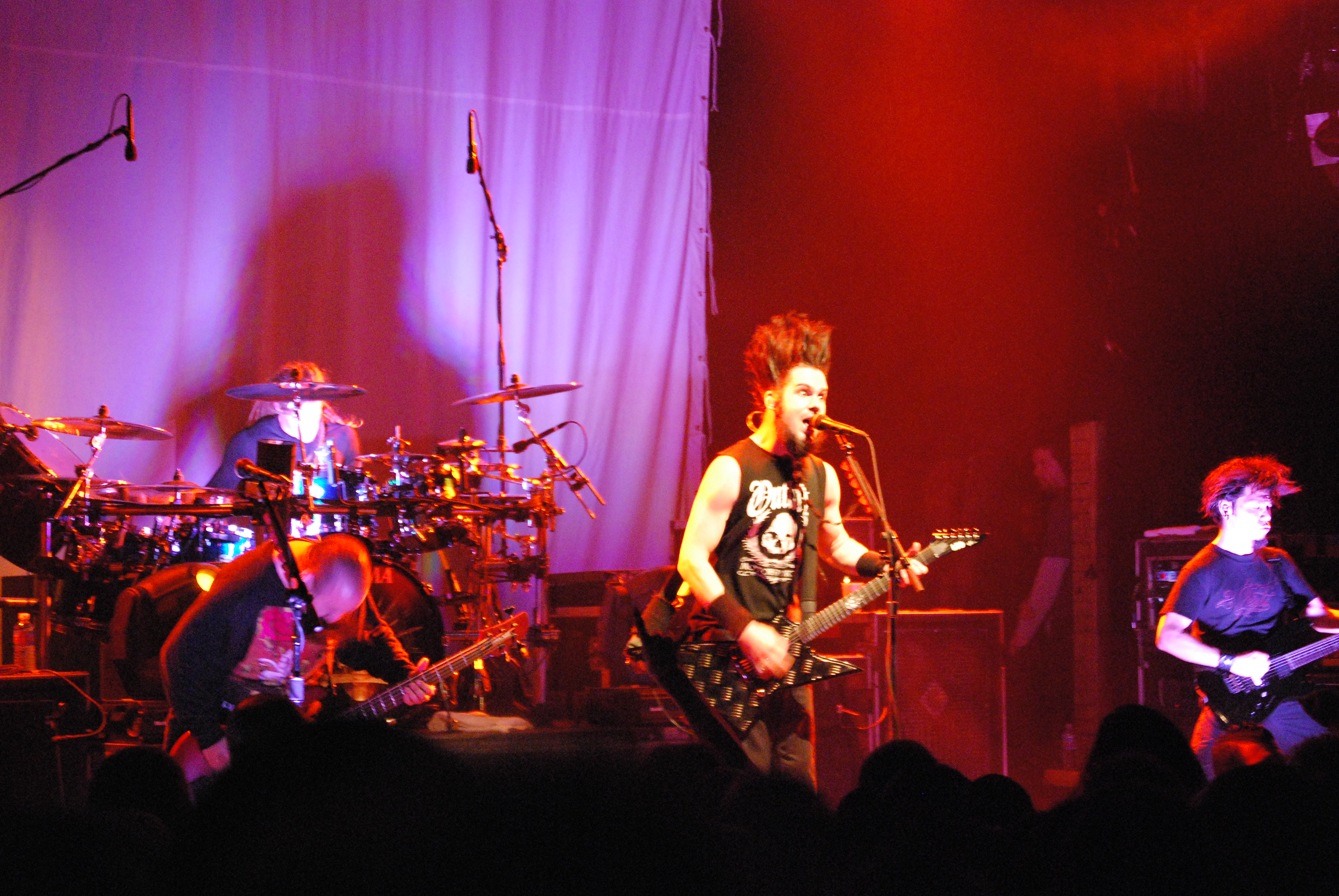
- Static-X at 2007's Cannibal Killers tour
- Studio albums: 8
- Extended plays: 1
- Live albums: 1
- Compilation albums: 1
- Singles: 19
- Video albums: 4
- Music videos: 22
- Promotional singles: 3

American industrial metal band Static-X has released eight studio albums, one live album, one compilation album, one video album, one extended play, nineteen singles, three promotional singles and twenty-two music videos.

== Albums ==
=== Studio albums ===
List of studio albums, with selected chart positions and certifications
Title	Album details	Peak chart positions										Sales	Certifications
Title	Album details	US	US Hard Rock	US Rock	AUS	AUT	FRA	GER	JPN	UK	UK Rock	Sales	Certifications
Wisconsin Death Trip	Released: March 23, 1999 (US); Label: Warner Bros.; Formats: CD, cassette, digital download	107	—	—	—	—	—	—	—	—	—	US: 793,934+	RIAA: Platinum
Machine	Released: May 22, 2001 (US); Label: Warner Bros.; Formats: CD, cassette, digital download	11	—	—	—	—	—	—	55	56	5	US:400,320+	RIAA: Gold
Shadow Zone	Released: October 7, 2003 (US); Label: Warner Bros.; Formats: CD, digital download	20	—	—	66	—	110	79	120	113	10		
Start a War	Released: June 14, 2005 (US); Label: Warner Bros.; Formats: CD, digital download	29	—	—	52	55	135	88	191	—	21	US: 81,000+	
Cannibal	Released: April 3, 2007 (US); Label: Reprise; Formats: CD, LP, digital download	36	—	8	26	56	200	—	—	—	23	US: 160,000+	
Cult of Static	Released: March 17, 2009 (US); Label: Reprise; Formats: CD, LP, digital download	16	2	6	33	—	—	—	—	—	14	US: 100,000+	
Project: Regeneration Vol. 1	Released: July 10, 2020 (US); Label: Otsego Entertainment Group/The Orchard Music; Formats: CD, LP, digital download	48	3	4	—	—	—	—	—	—	3	US: 12,500	
Project: Regeneration Vol. 2	Released: January 26, 2024 (US); Label: Otsego Entertainment Group/The Orchard Music; Formats: CD, LP, digital download	—	—	—	—	—	—	—	—	—	10		
"—" denotes a recording that did not chart or was not released in that territory.

=== Live albums ===
List of live albums
Title	Album details
Cannibal Killers Live	Released: October 7, 2008 (US); Label: Reprise; Formats: CD, digital download, DVD

=== Compilation albums ===
List of compilation albums, with selected chart positions
Title	Album details	Peak chart positions	
Title	Album details	US	FRA
Beneath... Between... Beyond...	Released: July 20, 2004 (US); Label: Warner Bros.; Formats: CD, digital download	139	169

=== Video albums ===
List of video albums
Title	Album details
Where the Hell Are We and What Day Is It... This Is Static-X	Released: March 27, 2001 (US) (unreleased); Label: Warner Bros.; Formats: VHS, DVD
Shadow Zone / X-Posed	Label: Warner Bros.; Format: CD/DVD
Start a War / X-Rated	Label: Warner Bros.; Format: CD/DVD
Cannibal Killers Live	Released: October 7, 2008 (US); Label: Reprise; Format: DVD

== Extended plays ==
List of extended plays
Title	EP details
The Death Trip Continues	Released: 2000 (US); Label: Warner Bros.; Formats: CD

== Singles ==
List of singles, with selected chart positions, showing year released, certifications and album name
Title	Year	Peak chart positions						Certifications	Album
Title	Year	US Sales	US Alt.	US Dance Dig.	US Main. Rock	US Act. Rock	UK	Certifications	Album
"Push It"	1999	57	36	5	20	18	—	RIAA: Gold	Wisconsin Death Trip
"I'm with Stupid"	2000	—	—	—	38	33	—		Wisconsin Death Trip
"Bled for Days"	2000	—	—	—	36	25	—		Wisconsin Death Trip
"Love Dump"	2000	—	—	—	—	—	—		Wisconsin Death Trip
"This Is Not"	2001	—	—	—	36	29	—		Machine
"Black and White"	2001	—	—	—	35	28	65		Machine
"Cold"	2001	—	—	—	29	28	—		Machine
"The Only"	2003	—	—	—	22	20	—		Shadow Zone
"So"	2004	—	—	—	37	35	—		Shadow Zone
"I'm the One"	2005	—	—	—	22	20	—		Start a War
"Dirthouse"	2005	—	—	—	27	26	—		Start a War
"Destroyer"	2007	—	—	—	23	19	—		Cannibal
"Cannibal"	2007	—	—	—	—	38	—		Cannibal
"Stingwray"	2009	—	—	—	—	40	—		Cult of Static
"Hollow (Project Regeneration)"	2020	—	—	14	—	—	—		Project: Regeneration Vol. 1
"All These Years"	2020	—	—	—	—	—	—		Project: Regeneration Vol. 1
"Terrible Lie" (Nine Inch Nails cover)	2023	—	—	—	—	—	—		Project: Regeneration Vol. 2
"Stay Alive"	2023	—	—	—	—	—	—		Project: Regeneration Vol. 2
"Zombie"	2023	—	—	—	—	—	—		Project: Regeneration Vol. 2
"—" denotes a recording that did not chart or was not released in that territory.

=== Promotional singles ===
List of promotional singles, showing year released and album name
Title	Year	Album
"Otsegolectric"	2003	Shadow Zone
"Destroy All"	2003	Shadow Zone
"Z28"	2009	Cult of Static

== Soundtrack appearances ==
List of non-single guest appearances, showing year released and album name
Title	Year	Album
"So Real"	2000	Scream 3 soundtrack
"Burning Inside" (Ministry cover; featuring Burton C. Bell)	2000	The Crow: Salvation soundtrack
"Behind the Wall of Sleep"	2000	Nativity in Black II: A Tribute to Black Sabbath
"S.O.M."	2000	MTV The Return of the Rock
"Hip Hop" (featuring Dead Prez)	2000	Loud Rocks
"Crash"	2000	Batman Beyond: Return of the Joker soundtrack
"Otsego Undead"	2000	Dracula 2000 soundtrack
"Anything but This"	2002	Resident Evil soundtrack
"Deliver Me"	2003	The Texas Chainsaw Massacre soundtrack
"The Only"	2003	Need for Speed: Underground soundtrack
"Skinnyman"	2005	Need for Speed: Most Wanted soundtrack
"Start a War"	2006	WWE SmackDown! vs. RAW 2006 soundtrack
"No Submission"	2006	Saw III soundtrack
"Lunatic"	2008	Punisher: War Zone soundtrack

== Music videos ==
List of music videos, showing year released and director
Title	Year	Director(s)	Album
"Push It"	1999	Mick Olszewski	Wisconsin Death Trip
"I'm with Stupid"	2000	David Meyers	Wisconsin Death Trip
"Bled for Days"	2000	Mitch Sinoway	Wisconsin Death Trip
"This Is Not"	2001	Atom Rothlein	Machine
"Black and White"	2001	Len Wiseman	Machine
"Cold"	2002	Nathan Cox, Joe Hahn	Machine
"The Only"	2003	P. R. Brown	Shadow Zone
"So"	2003	Darren Lynn Bousman	Shadow Zone
"I'm the One"	2005	P. R. Brown	Start a War
"Dirthouse"	2006	Nate Weaver	Start a War
"Destroyer"	2007	The Butcher Brothers	Cannibal
"Cannibal" (Live)	2007	Colin Greene	Cannibal Killers Live
"Stingwray"	2009	Nathan Cox	Cult of Static
"Hollow (Project Regeneration)"	2020	Xer0 and Matt Zane	Project: Regeneration Vol. 1
"All These Years"	2020	Xer0 and Matt Zane	Project: Regeneration Vol. 1
"Bring You Down (Project Regeneration)"	2020	Xer0 and Matt Zane	Project: Regeneration Vol. 1
"Dead Souls"	2020	Wombatfire	Project: Regeneration Vol. 1
"Terminator Oscillator"	2021	Edsel Dope	Project: Regeneration Vol. 1
"Terrible Lie"	2023	Edsel Dope and Matt Zane	Project: Regeneration Vol. 2
"Stay Alive"	2023	Unknown	Project: Regeneration Vol. 2
"Zombie"	2023	Edsel Dope	Project: Regeneration Vol. 2
"Otsego Placebo"	2024	Edsel Dope	Project: Regeneration Vol. 1
