= Cannibal Killers Live =

Video by Static-X
- Released: October 7, 2008
- Recorded: June 2, 2007
- Venue: The Big Easy, Spokane, Washington
- Genre: Industrial metal, nu metal, alternative metal
- Label: Reprise

Static-X chronology
Cannibal (2007)	Cannibal Killers Live (2008)	Cult of Static (2009)

Cannibal Killers Live is a CD/DVD box set by American industrial metal band Static-X. It is the first time the band has released a live album, and contains footage from a live performance in Spokane, Washington. Cannibal Killers Live contains the entire library of the band's officially released videos, and is accompanied by a CD that contains the audio for the Spokane concert. There was also a special edition of the set which was only attainable through Static-X's website. The special edition included a third disc containing a concert filmed in Los Angeles, 1997.

== Track listing ==
DVD1/CD
No.	Title	Album	Length
1.	"Cannibal"	Cannibal	3:12
2.	"Dirthouse"	Start a War	3:15
3.	"...In a Bag"	Machine	4:22
4.	"I'm with Stupid"	Wisconsin Death Trip	3:18
5.	"Bled for Days"	Wisconsin Death Trip	3:54
6.	"No Submission"	Cannibal	2:47
7.	"Behemoth"	Cannibal	3:05
8.	"Destroy All"	Shadow Zone	2:27
9.	"Cold"	Machine	3:43
10.	"Black and White"	Machine	3:46
11.	"Destroyer"	Cannibal	2:49
12.	"The Enemy"	Start a War	2:36
13.	"The Trance Is the Motion"	Wisconsin Death Trip	4:26
14.	"This Is Not"	Machine	3:10
15.	"Love Dump"	Wisconsin Death Trip	4:33
16.	"Push It"	Wisconsin Death Trip	2:42
17.	"Get to the Gone"	Machine	3:22

DVD2 (Music videos)

1. "Push It"
2. "I'm with Stupid"
3. "Bled for Days"
4. "This Is Not"
5. "Black and White"
6. "Cold"
7. "The Only"
8. "So"
9. "I'm the One"
10. "Dirthouse"
11. "Destroyer"
12. "Cannibal"

DVD3 (Live in Los Angeles, 1997)

1. "I'm with Stupid"
2. "Down"
3. "Otsegolation"
4. "Wisconsin Death Trip"
5. "I Am"
6. "Sweat of the Bud"
7. "Love Dump"
8. "Push It"

== Personnel ==
- Wayne Static - lead vocals, rhythm guitar, programming
- Koichi Fukuda - lead guitar
- Tony Campos - bass, backing vocals
- Nick Oshiro - drums
- Ken Jay - drums (featured in music videos and the live 1997 footage)
- Tripp Eisen - lead guitar (featured in music videos only)
