= SO =

SO or so may refer to:

== Arts and entertainment ==
=== Music ===
==== Songs ====
- "So" (Static-X song), 2004 single
- "Sō (New Love New World)", 2008 single by Masaharu Fukuyama
- "So", by War from Why Can't We Be Friends? (1975)
- "So", by Fates Warning from Disconnected (2000)

==== Other uses in music ====
- So (album), an album by Peter Gabriel
- So (band), a duo from the 1980s formed by two members of The Opposition
- S.O. (rapper)

=== Television ===
- "SO" (Sons of Anarchy), the third season premiere of the FX television series Sons of Anarchy
- So Television, a British TV production company

== Language ==
- So language (Democratic Republic of Congo), a Bantu language
- Sô language, a Katuic language (Mon-Khmer) of Laos and Thailand
- Swo language, a Bantu language of Cameroon
- Soo language, a Kuliak language of Uganda
- Somali language (ISO 639 language code "so")
- So (kana), a Japanese kana
- So (word), an English word

== Names and people ==
- Sō, a Japanese surname and given name
- Su (surname) (苏/蘇), a Chinese surname and a Korean surname (소) derived from it
- So (Korean name) (蘇 or 邵)
- So (Hebrew: סוֹא), King of Egypt, usually identified with Osorkon IV
- Wesley So (born 1993), Filipino and American chess grandmaster
- Sao civilisation or So, an African civilisation and population that flourished from ca. the 6th century to ca. 15th century
- S.O. (rapper)

== Places ==
- So, Iran, a village in Isfahan Province, Iran
- Canton of Solothurn, Switzerland
- So Phisai District, Bueng Kan Province, Thailand
- SO postcode area, UK, the Southampton postcode area
- Somalia (ISO 3166-1 alpha-2 country code SO)
- South Otago, part of New Zealand's South Island

== Transportation ==
- Southern State Parkway, a highway in New York, United States
- Railway line prefix SO of Sotetsu lines
- Austrian Air Services (former IATA airline designator SO)
- Sosoliso Airlines (former IATA airline designator SO)
- Southern Airways (former IATA airline designator SO)
- Superior Aviation (IATA airline designator SO)

== Science, technology, and mathematics ==
=== Biology and medicine ===
- Syndromic obesity, excess body fat occurring as part of a syndrome
- Sphincter of Oddi, a muscular valve of the duodenum

=== Computing ===
- .so, the top-level Internet domain of Somalia
- .so, a filename extension for a shared object (a dynamic library or module) in Unix and Linux
- Shift Out, an ASCII control character
- Small-outline integrated circuit
- StackOverflow, a programming Q&A site
- Sony's mobile phones in Japan

=== Mathematics ===
- SO (complexity), second-order logic in descriptive complexity
- Special orthogonal group, a subset of an orthogonal group
  - SO(2), a term used in mathematics, the group of rotations about a fixed point in the Euclidean plane
  - SO(3), a term used in mathematics, the group of rotations about a fixed point in three-dimensional Euclidean space
  - SO(4), a term used in mathematics, the group of rotations about a fixed point in four-dimensional Euclidean space
  - SO(8), a term used in mathematics, the special orthogonal group acting on eight-dimensional Euclidean space
  - $\mathfrak{so}(n)$, the corresponding special orthogonal Lie algebra

=== Physics and chemistry ===
- Sulfur monoxide
- SO(10) (physics), a term used in particle physics, one of the grand unified theories is based on the SO(10) Lie group

== Food, business, and energy industry ==
- So (dairy product), a type of dairy product made in ancient Japan
- SO, a private label brand by American retailer Kohl's
- Shell on, a form of presentation in shrimp marketing
- Sales order, an order received by a business from a customer
- Southern Company (stock symbol SO), a gas and electric utility holding company based in the Southern United States
- Esso, a trading name for ExxonMobil, short for Standard Oil

== Other uses ==
- Significant other, a partner in an intimate relationship
- Strikeout, in baseball

== See also ==
- So and so (disambiguation)
- Só (disambiguation)
- S0 (disambiguation)
- SSO (disambiguation)
- Soo (disambiguation)
- ESO (disambiguation)
