= Soh (surname) =

- Language: Chinese, Japanese, Korean

Origin
- Region of origin: Singapore, Malaysia, Korea, others

Other names
- Variant forms: Chinese: Su; Korean: Seo, So

Soh is a surname in various cultures.

== Origins ==
Soh may be:

- A spelling of the pronunciation in some varieties of Chinese (such as Cantonese or Hokkien) of the Chinese surname spelled in Mandarin Pinyin as Sū (simplified Chinese: 苏; traditional Chinese: 蘇)
- An alternative spelling of the Korean surnames spelled in the Revised Romanization of Korean (RR) as Seo (Korean: 서; Hanja: 徐 or 西) or So (Korean: 소; Hanja: 蘇 or 邵)
- An alternative spelling of the Japanese surname Sō (宗)

== Statistics ==
The 2000 South Korean census found 49,456 people with the surname spelled So in RR, and 695,241 with the surname spelled Seo in RR. The former surname is spelled as Soh relatively frequently, but the latter surname is not. In a study based on a sample of applications for South Korean passports in 2007, 8.9% of people with the surname spelled So in RR chose to spell it as Soh in their passports, but none of the people with the surname spelled Seo in RR chose to spell it as Soh in their passports.

According to statistics cited by Patrick Hanks, there were 100 people on the island of Great Britain and none on the island of Ireland with the surname Soh as of 2011.

The 2010 United States census found 757 people with the surname Soh, making it the 30,767th-most-common name in the country. This represented an increase from 516 people (40,019th-most-common) in the 2000 census. In both censuses, about nine-tenths of the bearers of the surname identified as Asian, and about 5% as White.

== People ==
People with one of these surnames spelled as Soh in English include:

- Soh Kwang-pom (서광범; 徐光範; 1859–1897), Korean reformist of the late Joseon dynasty
- Soh Jaipil (서재필; 徐載弼; 1864–1961), Korean independence activist and medical doctor
- Soh Chin Ann (苏进安; born 1950), Malaysian footballer
- Soh Hang-suen (蘇杏璇; 1951–2013), Hong Kong actress
- Shigeru Soh (宗茂; born 1953), Japanese long-distance runner, twin brother of Takeshi
- Takeshi Soh (宗猛; born 1953), Japanese long-distance runner, twin brother of Shigeru
- June-Young Soh (소준영; born 1965), South Korean director and musician
- Cavin Soh (苏梽诚; born 1970), Singaporean actor
- Hany Soh (苏慧敏; born 1987), Singaporean politician
- Charmaine Soh (born 1990), Singaporean netball player
- Debra W. Soh (born 1990), Canadian neuroscientist and science journalist
- Soh Rui Yong (苏睿勇; born 1991), Singaporean long-distance runner
- Soh Wooi Yik (苏伟译; born 1998), Malaysian badminton player
- Loïc Mbe Soh (born 2001), Cameroonian-born French footballer
- Chunghee Sarah Soh (소정희; 蘇貞姫; fl. 1987–present), South Korean-born American anthropologist
- Kopi Soh (fl. 2010s), pseudonym of a Malaysian author

== See also ==
- Fikri Che Soh (born 1998), Malaysian footballer (Che Soh is a patronymic, not a surname)
