= OS =

OS, O.S., Os, O's, or os may refer to:

== Computing ==
- Operating system, collection of software that manages computer hardware and software resources
- Open source (disambiguation)
- OpenStack, a software platform for cloud computing

== Medicine ==
- os or ostium, a mouth or mouth-like opening
  - per os, meaning "ingestion by mouth"
  - external os, the external orifice of the uterus
  - internal os, the internal orifice of the uterus
  - os or ostium, the opening of a coronary artery
- O.S. or OS, oculus sinister, meaning "left eye" in general ophthalmologic or optometric usage, particularly in eyeglass prescriptions (deprecated abbreviation)
- Ohtahara syndrome, a brain disorder
- Overall survival rate, a cancer survival statistic
- Oneiroid syndrome, a dreamlike fantastic delusional state

== People ==
- Alexander Os (born 1980), a Norwegian biathlete
- Os du Randt (born 1972), a South African rugby player
- Os Guinness (born 1941), an English author and social critic
- For people named van Os see Van Os

== Places ==
=== Norway ===
- Os Municipality (Innlandet), a municipality in Innlandet county, Norway
- Os Municipality (Hordaland), a former municipality in the old Hordaland county, Norway
- Os i Østerdalen, a village within Os Municipality in Innlandet county, Norway
- Os, Østfold, a parish in Rakkestad Municipality in Østfold county, Norway
- Os Church, a name for several churches in Norway

=== Poland ===
- Oś, Kluczbork County, a village in Kluczbork County, Opole Voivodeship, Poland
- Osiedle (Os.), a Polish term used for housing subdivisions in Poland

=== Other places ===
- Os, Värnamo, a village in Värnamo Municipality, Småland province, Sweden
- OS, ICAO code for airports in Syria
- OS, WMO country code for Austria

== Geography and transportation ==
- Esker, also os, a long, winding ridge of sand and gravel in (formerly) glaciated regions
- Ordnance Survey, national mapping agency of Great Britain
- Austrian Airlines (IATA code OS based on its original name: Österreichische Luftverkehrs AG)
- O.S. Engines, a Japanese manufacturer of model aircraft engines

== Sport ==
- Ohio State Buckeyes, a group of collegiate teams representing The Ohio State University
- Os TF, a sports club in Os, Norway
- On-sight climbing, an ascent of a rock climbing route on the first attempt
- Orioles, nicknamed "O's":
  - Baltimore Orioles, a Maryland baseball team
  - Charlotte Orioles, a North Carolina baseball team, renamed the Charlotte Knights in 1988
- Leyton Orient F.C., an English football (soccer) team nicknamed "O's"
- London Olympians, named 1995–2005 as London O's, an American football team based in Greenwich, London, England

== Titles ==
- Ordinary seaman, an unlicensed member of the deck department of a merchant ship
- Ordnance sergeant, an enlisted rank in the U.S. and Confederate armies during the American Civil War era
- Old Shirburnian, used by alumni of Sherborne School
- Old Stonyhurst, used by alumni of Stonyhurst College
- O.S., Order of Santiago, a Spanish order dedicated to St James the Greater
- O.S., Order of Sikatuna, the national order of diplomatic merit of the Philippines

== Language ==
- Ōs (rune) (ᚩ), a rune of the Anglo-Saxon fuþorc
- Ossetic language (ISO 639-1 abbreviation OS)

== Food ==
- "O's", a name for breakfast cereal with O-shaped pieces, cereal similar to , e.g. Oreo O's, Krusty-O's, some kinds of Cheerios — see list of breakfast cereals to find more
- SpaghettiOs, a brand of canned ring-shaped pasta in tomato sauce
- Newman-O's, cookies made by Newman's Own

== Other uses ==
- Ocean Science (journal), an oceanographic journal
- Osmium, symbol Os, a chemical element
- "Os" (Fringe), an episode (S3 E16 / #59) of the television show Fringe
- Old Style (O.S.) date, indicating use of an earlier calendar (in Anglophone countries, the Julian Calendar), as opposed to "N.S." (new style), usually indicating use of the Gregorian Calendar
- Ōs, an Old English word denoting a god in Anglo-Saxon paganism, related to æsir

== See also ==
- 0S (disambiguation)
- ÖS (disambiguation)
- Oz (disambiguation)
- O (disambiguation)
- X's and O's (disambiguation)
- Triple O's, a quick service brand associated with White Spot
