= Su (surname) =

Sū
- The Chinese character 蘇 in seal script
- Romanisation: Su, Soo, So, Soh, Sou, Souw, Thu, Tô
- Pronunciation: Sū (Mandarin Pinyin); Sou1 (Cantonese Jyutping); So͘ (Hokkien Pe̍h-ōe-jī)
- Language: Chinese languages, Japanese, Vietnamese, Korean, Filipino

Su is the pinyin romanization of the common Chinese surname written 苏 in simplified characters and 蘇 traditionally.

It was listed 42nd among the Song-era list of the Hundred Family Surnames.

In 2019 it was the 46th most common surname in mainland China.

== Romanizations ==
The Wade form of the name is identical to the pinyin, but it is also sometimes irregularly romanized as Soo.

蘇 and 苏 are also romanized So and Sou in Cantonese; Soh and Souw in Southern Min dialects; and Thu in Gan.

This Chinese name is also the source of the Vietnamese surname Tô (Chữ Nôm: 蘇); the Korean surname 소, which is romanized So; the Japanese surname 蘇, which is also romanized So; and the Filipino/Tagalog surname So. Also, the Filipino family name "Solon" is a Hispanicized version of So. The Solon clan coming from Cebu are famous for their ancestors who were government officials. The Solons were originally from Canton.

== Distribution ==
Su was the 41st-most-common Chinese surname in the mainland during the 1982 census and the 45th-most-common in the 2007 report on household registrations released by the Chinese Ministry of Public Security. It has been listed as the 23rd-most-common Chinese surname in Taiwan.

Su is a somewhat common surname in the United States, listed 5,897th during the 1990 census and 3,835th during the year 2000 one. The other romanizations are less popular: So (8527 & 5167), Soo (17545 & 22160), Sou (77891 & 30226), Thu (49039 & 64912), and Soh (unlisted & 40074); Souw had fewer than one hundred resident bearers in the United States during both censuses and was unlisted both times.

Statistics Canada does not release surname lists from its censuses, but Su and So were both listed among the 200-most-common peculiarly Chinese-Canadian surnames in a 2010 survey of the Registered Persons Database of all current and former Canadian health card recipients in the province of Ontario.

== Character decomposition ==
The character 蘇 was formed by the addition of the grass radical (艹) to the phonetic component 穌.

== Origins ==
The original pronunciation of 穌 has been reconstructed as *s.ŋˤa in Old Chinese, but this had already developed into su by the time of Middle Chinese. The addition of the grass radical suggests its original meaning was its use describing varieties of the mint perilla, but its general meaning today is as an abbreviation for Suzhou and replacement for a related word meaning "revive".

As with many Chinese surnames, however, there are a variety of separate legends and origins told about the current bearers of the name.

One origin derives from Fan, purported to be the eldest grandson of the six great-great-great-great-grandsons of the Yellow Emperor and said to have lived in Kunwu (昆吾), the northeast region of Yuncheng in Shanxi. During the Xia dynasty, King Huai or Fen gave Yousu (有蘇}, modern Suling (肅靈^{?}) in Henan) to the rulers of Kunwu as a fief and they established it as the State of Su. This perished in the late Shang dynasty – whose fall was traditionally blamed upon the beautiful concubine Su Daji, – but its rulers and people took the state's name as their clan name and moved elsewhere.

Another derives from Su Chasheng who was Minister of Justice under King Wu of the Zhou dynasty and revived the former region of Su as his fief, with a new capital city at Wen (modern Wen County in Henan). He is also considered to be the ancestor of the Wen family.

Prior to the Qin dynasty, the Su clan mainly resided in Henan and Hebei, but, during the Warring States period, one group moved southward into Hubei and Hunan and another west into Shaanxi. Under the Qin and Han, this Shaanxi clan became a prominent and distinguished family while a third group of clans moved east into Shandong.

Another origin was from a Han-era ethnic group in Liaodong, whose family name Wuyuanyousu (烏垣有蘇) was later shortened into Su during the Northern Wei.

Large numbers of Su moved into Sichuan and Fujian during the Tang dynasty. During the Northern Song, they moved further southward to Guizhou, Guangdong, and Guangxi. Their current relative popularity in Taiwan began following migrations during the Ming and Qing.

In the Philippines, the rare family name Solon derives from the surname So/Su.

== Notable people with the surname Su ==
=== Historical ===
- Su Daji, the beautiful concubine traditionally blamed for the fall of the Shang dynasty
- Su Wu, a Western Han dynasty official
- Su Ze, an Eastern Han dynasty official
- Su Wei or Wuwei, a Sui-era official
- Su Liangsi, Duke of Wen, chancellor to Emperor Ruizong during the Tang dynasty
- Su Dingfang, Tang-era general
- The Three Sus (Chinese: 三蘇, San Sū), the Chinese poets Su Shi, Su Xun, and Su Zhe
- Su Song, famous Song dynasty scientist who invented the world's first endless power chain drive and hydro-mechanical astronomical clock tower.
- Soh Kwang-pom, Korean reformist of the late Joseon dynasty
- Soh Jaipil, Korean independence activist and medical doctor
- Soh Hang-suen, Hong Kong Actress
- Su Shi, an ancient Chinese poet

=== Modern ===
- So Ji Sub, South Korean Actor
- John So, former Lord Mayor of Melbourne
- Louisa So, Hong Kong actress
- Wesley So, Chinese Filipino chess prodigy
- William So, Hong Kong singer and actor
- Soh Hang Suen, former Hong Kong TVB actress
- James Soh Fook Leong, a surviving victim of the Amber Beacon Tower murder
- Judith Su, American biophotonics researcher
- Phillipa Soo, American actress and singer
- Alec Su, Taiwanese singer and actor
- Su Bingqi, archaeologist
- Su Bingtian, Chinese track and field athlete
- Su Buqing, mathematician
- Su Chi, Minister of Mainland Affairs Council of the Republic of China
- Su Chih-fen, Magistrate of Yunlin County
- Su Chin-shou, Hui chief of staff to General Ma Zhancang
- Su Chun-jung, Deputy Minister of Directorate-General of Personnel Administration of the Republic of China
- Su Dabao, Chinese performance sand artist
- Su Jain-rong, Minister of Finance of the Republic of China
- Jen Su, TV presenter
- Lisa Su, CEO & President of Advanced Micro Devices (AMD)
- Su Li-chiung, former Deputy Minister of Health and Welfare of the Republic of China
- Su Shanshan, Chinese singer, actress, and member of Chinese idol group SNH48
- Su Tseng-chang, Premier of Taiwan
- Wan-Ting Su (born 1982), Taiwanese artist
- Charoen Sirivadhanabhakdi (Su Xuming), Thai billionaire businessman
- Su Yunying, Chinese singer
- Oakley Neil H T Caesar-Su, known professionally as Central Cee, British rapper and songwriter

Tô (Vietnamese name of Su)

- Tô Hiến Thành, a Vietnamese official under the Lý dynasty
- Tô Trung Từ, a high ranking general and attempted usurper of the Lý dynasty

Soh (English name of Su)

- Cavin Soh, Singaporean actor
- Soh Chin Aun, Malaysian Footballer
- Chunghee Sarah Soh, South Korean-born American anthropologist
- Debra W. Soh, Canadian neuroscientist and science journalist
- June-Young Soh, South Korean director and musician
- Soh Rui Yong, Singaporean long-distance runner
- Soh Wooi Yik, Malaysian badminton player

== World Federation of Soh Associations ==
Over 1,000 representatives of Soh Clan Associations from around the world meet every two years at the Congress of the World Federation of Soh Associations. Participants hail from China, Taiwan, Singapore, Malaysia, Indonesia, Thailand, South Korea, the Philippines, Australia, America and Europe. The first congress was held in Manila in 1994.
