= Degernes =

Village and parish in Østfold county, Norway

Coordinates: 59°21′14″N 11°25′27″E

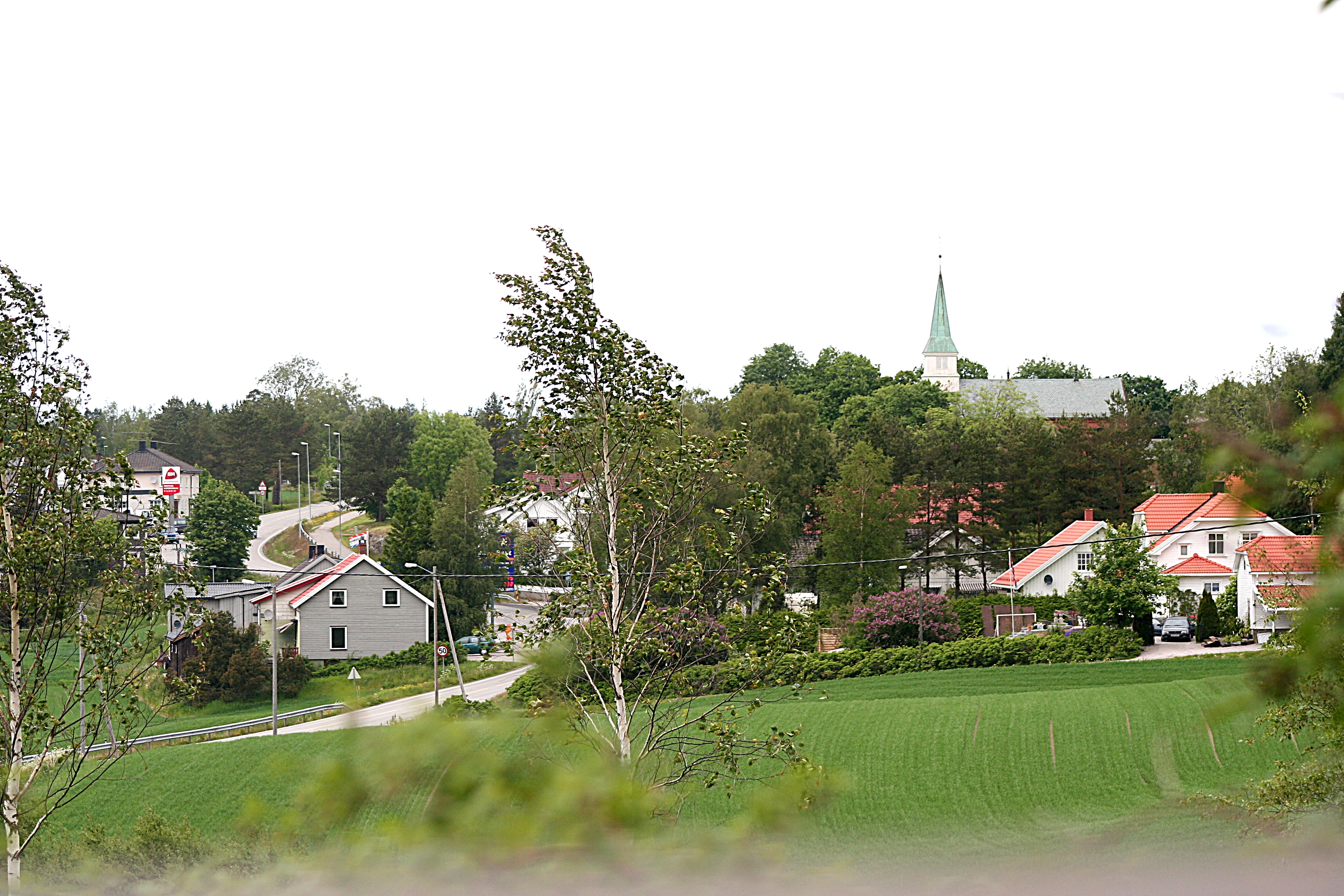
Degernes

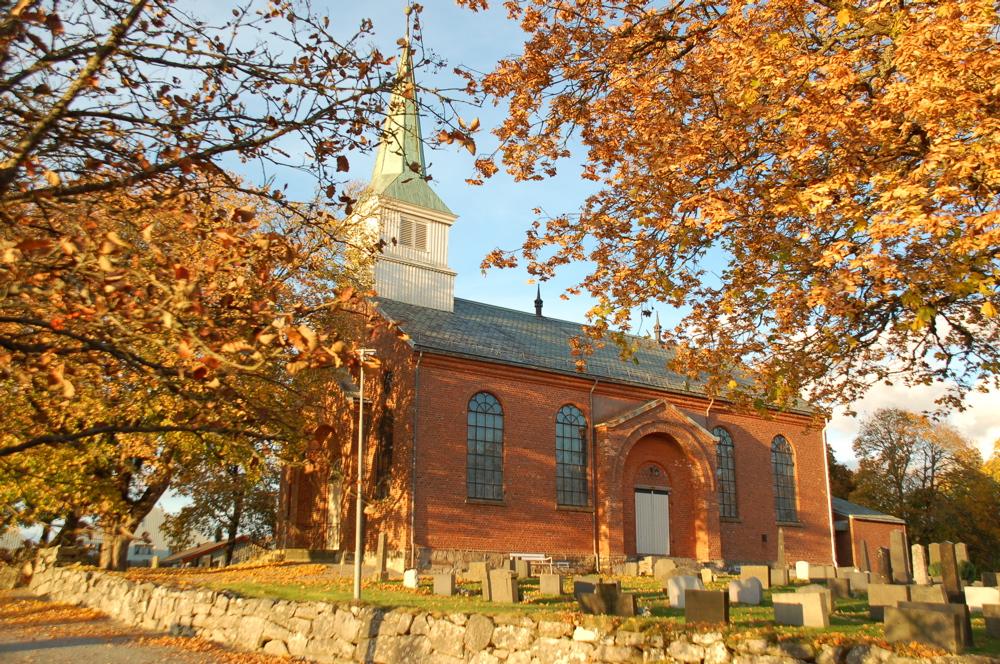
Degernes Church

Degernes is a village and parish in Rakkestad municipality in Østfold county, Norway.

== History ==
Rakkestad was established as a municipality on 1 January 1838 (see formannskapsdistrikt). It was divided into the parishes of Rakkestad, Degernes, and Os. Degernes was separated from Rakkestad as a municipality of its own on 1 January 1917, but it was merged back into Rakkestad on 1 January 1964.

Degernesis located on Highway 22 towards Halden about eight miles southeast of the community center of Rakkestad. The village of Degernes has today a population of 277 (SSB 2005). The private sector consists largely of agriculture, principally animal husbandry. During the 1950s there was some mining in the municipality.

Degernes Church (Degernes Kirke) is from 1863. It was built of brick and has 350 seats. It was designed by architect Christian Heinrich Grosch.

The church was restored in 1962. Access to the site is via Rv22 and Fv656. Degernes Hall (Degerneshallen) is the only sports facility in the municipality. Degernes Hall was finished during 1984. The hall used mostly for team handball and gymnastics.

The oldest settlement of the Fosna-Hensbacka culture in Eastern Norway is found at Høgnipen, located in the southern part of Degernes. The two sites at Høgnipen are called Rørmyr and Mellommyr and are estimated to date back 10,000 years.

== Etymology ==
The municipality (originally the parish) was named after the old farm of Degernes (Norse Digranes), since the first church was built there. The first element is digr 'big', the last element is nes n 'headland'.

== Notable residents ==
- Asbjørn Solberg (1893–1977), member of the Norwegian Parliament and former mayor of Degernes
- Erik Varden, catholic bishop of Trondheim
