= President Su =

President Su may refer to:

- Su Jia-chyuan (born 1956), 11th President of the Legislative Yuan of the Republic of China
- Su Tseng-chang (born 1948), 20th and 30th President of Executive Yuan of the Republic of China

== See also ==
- Su (surname)
