= I'm the One =

I'm the One may refer to:

== Albums ==
- I'm the One (Annette Peacock album) or the title song, 1972
- I'm the One (Roberta Flack album) or the title song, 1982

== Songs ==
- "I'm the One" (Descendents song), 1996
- "I'm the One" (DJ Khaled song), 2017
- "I'm the One" (Gerry and the Pacemakers song), 1964
- "I'm the One" (Static-X song), 2005
- "I'm the One", by Bizzy Bone featuring Joel Madden, from A Song for You, 2008
- "I'm the One", by the Cheetah Girls from The Cheetah Girls: One World, 2008
- "I'm the One", by Christine McVie from Christine McVie, 1984
- "I'm the One", by Danzig from Danzig II: Lucifuge, 1990
- "I'm the One", by Hellyeah from Welcome Home, 2019
- "I'm the One", by Material from One Down, 1982
- "I'm the One", by Morten Harket from Out of My Hands, 2012
- "I'm the One", by MoStack from Stacko, 2019
- "I'm the One", by Seether from Karma and Effect, 2005
- "I'm the One", by Van Halen from Van Halen, 1978
- "I'm the One", by Victoria Monét from Jaguar II, 2023

== See also ==
- I'm the One... Nobody Else, a 1992 album by Brigitte Nielsen
- "I'm One", a 1973 song by the Who
