= António Nobre =

Portuguese poet (1867–1900)

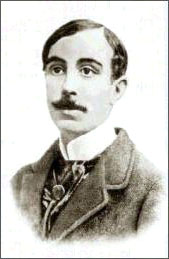
- Born: António Pereira Nobre; 16 August 1867; Porto, Portugal
- Died: 18 March 1900 (aged 32); Porto, Portugal
- Education: University of Coimbra; Paris Institute of Political Studies
- Occupation: Poet

António Pereira Nobre (16 August 1867 – 18 March 1900) was a Portuguese poet. The book Só (Paris, 1892), was the only book he published.

== Life ==
=== Northern Portugal ===
Nobre was a member of a wealthy family. He was born in Porto, and spent his childhood in Trás-os-Montes and in Póvoa de Varzim.

=== Coimbra ===
He studied law unsuccessfully at the University of Coimbra from 1888 to 1890 when he dropped out. As a student in Coimbra, and according to his own words, he only felt at ease in his "tower" (referring to the Torre de Anto - Anto Tower, in upper Coimbra, where he lived) during the "sinister period" he spent studying law at the University of Coimbra. An unknown fiancée, more fictitious than concrete; a friend — Alberto de Oliveira, and a brief intervention in the literary life, through some magazines, did not conciliate him with the academic city of Coimbra where this predestined poet flunked twice.

=== Paris ===
He went to Paris, where he earned a degree in political science at the École Libre des Sciences Politiques. There, he came in contact with the French coeval poetry — he met Paul Verlaine and Jean Moréas, among others. He also met the famous Portuguese writer Eça de Queiroz in Paris, who was a Portuguese diplomat in the city. From 1890 to 1895, Nobre studied political science in Paris, where he was influenced by the French Symbolist poets and it was there that he wrote the greater part of the only book he published.

The Paris exile, sad by his own words ("poor Lusitanian, the wretched", lost in the crowd that does not know him), was not a time for happiness. The aristocratic shutting up caused nausea or indifference. Frustrated and always marginal experiences made him bitter. He was far from the sweat and from all sorts of fraternity, from desire and hate, and from the wailing of the breed, a childlike, lost, instinctive and princely life, a souvenir of the sweet old landscape that memory seems to encourage. In his mourning, Nobre considered himself a doomed poet, with a hard soul and a maiden's heart, which carried the sponge of gall in former processions.

== Style, work and last days ==
His verse marked a departure from objective realism and social commitment to subjective lyricism and an aesthetic point of view, walking more towards symbolism; one of the various modernist literary currents. The lack of means, aggravated by his father's death, made him morbidly reject the present and the future, following a pessimistic romantic attitude that led him to denounce his tedium. However excessive, this is a controlled attitude, due to a clear aesthetic mind and a real sense of ridicule. He learned the colloquial tone from Almeida Garrett and Júlio Dinis, and also from Jules Laforgue, but he exceeded them all in the peculiar compromise between irony and a refined puerility, a fountain of happiness because it represents a return to his happiest of times — a kingdom of his own from where he resuscitates characters and enchanted places, manipulating, as a virtuoso of nostalgia, the picturesque of popular festivals and of fishermen, the simple magic of toponyms and the language of the people.

“When he was born, we all were born. The sadness that each one of us brings with him, even in the sense of his joy, still is him, and his life, never perfectly real and certainly not lived, is, after all, the summary of the life we live - fatherless and motherless, lost from God, in the middle of the forest, and weeping, weeping uselessly, with no other consolation than this, childish, knowing that it is uselessly weeping. ”

— Fernando Pessoa, A Galera nr. 5-6, Coimbra, February 1915.

António resided at the Torre de Anto in Coimbra, where he adopted his pen name, Anto. His work explores themes of physical suffering, illness and social isolation and on the aesthetic life and the cultivation of a specific persona. In his courtship of death (to whose imminent threat he would later answer with dignity), he takes his spiritual dandyism to extremes, like in the “Balada do Caixão" (The Coffin Ballad). His poetry translates the lack of a total maturation, an adolescent “angelism” present in fabulous confirmations: he is “the moon”, “the saint”, “the snake”, “the sorcerer”, “the afflicted”, “the inspired”, “the unprecedented”, “the medium”, “the bizarre”, “the fool”, “the nauseated”, “the tortured”, “D. Enguiço”, “a supernatural poet.”

Narcissus in permanent soliloquy, whether he writes nostalgic verses to Manuel or speaks to his own pipe — António Nobre (A. N.) makes poetry out of the real, he covers what is prosaic with a soft mantle of legend (“My neighbour is a carpenter/he is a second-hand trader of Mrs. Death”) and creates, with a rare balance between intuition and critique, his familiar “fantastic” (“When the Moon, a beautiful milkmaid/goes deliver milk at the houses of Infinity”). His catholic imaginary world is the same as in a fairy tale, a crib of simple words but with an imaginative audacity in the scheming of those words that separate him from the consecrated lyrical language. His power of “invention” comes forth in the inspired, yet conscious, use of the verbal material (“Moons of Summer! Black moons of velvet!” or “The Abbey of my past”). Between the Garrettian and the symbolic aesthetic, the most personal and revealing feature of his vocabulary is naturally — even for his longing for the childhood aesthetical retrieval -, the diminutive. A man of sensibility rather than of reflection, he took from French symbolism, whose mystery and deep sense he could never penetrate, the repelling of oratory and of formal procedures, original imagery (“Trás-os-Montes of water”, “slaughter house of the planets”), the cult of synaesthesia, rhythmic freedom, and musical research. A. N. had a very thick ear. All his poetry is rigorously written to be heard, full of parallelisms, melodic repetitions, and onomatopoeias, and is extremely malleable. Its syllabic division depends on the rhythm that obeys feeling. However, the images or the words of his sentences rarely have the precious touch of symbolic jewelry. Evidently, in “Poentes de França”, the planets drink in silver chalices in the “tavern of sunset”; however, his transfiguration of reality almost always obeys not a purpose of sumptuous embellishment, like in Eugénio de Castro, but an essentially affectionate eager desire of an intimism of things (“the skinny and hunchbacked poplars”, etc.).

António Nobre died of tuberculosis in Foz do Douro, Porto, on 18 March 1900, after trying to recover from the disease in Switzerland, Madeira and New York City.

Other than Só (Paris, 1892), two other posthumous works were published: Despedidas (1st edition, 1902), with a fragment from O Desejado, and Primeiros Versos (1st edition, 1921). António Nobre's correspondence is compiled in several volumes: Cartas Inéditas a A.N., with an introduction and notes by A. Casais Monteiro, Cartas e Bilhetes-Postais a Justino de Montalvão with a foreword and notes by Alberto de Serpa, Porto, 1956; Correspondência, with an introduction and notes by Guilherme de Castilho, Lisbon, 1967 (a compilation of 244 letters, 56 of which were unpublished).

== Recognition ==
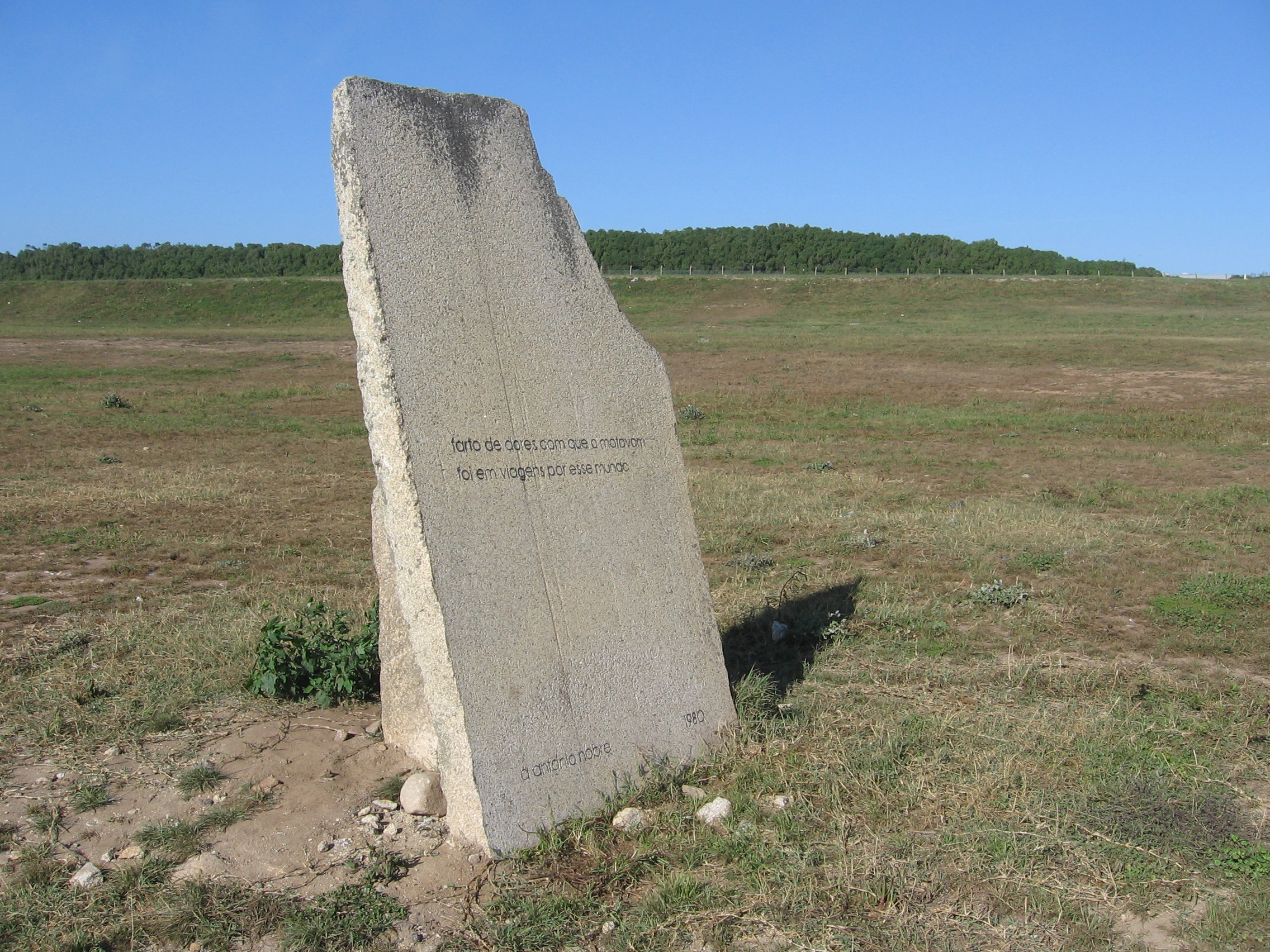
Monument to António Nobre in Leça da Palmeira.

A monument for António Nobre can be found near the Boa Nova beach in Leça da Palmeira. It was designed by Álvaro Siza Vieira and erected in 1980. The inscription reads: «farto de dores com que o matavam foi em viagens por esse mundo - a António Nobre, 1980». A bust of Antonio Nobre on a stone base / monument is in Porto's Jardim da Cordoaria, a park in the city.
