= Cannibal (Static-X album) =

Studio album by Static-X
- Released: April 3, 2007
- Recorded: 2006
- Studios: Hollywood Sound Recorders (Los Angeles, California) Barn & Share’s House
- Genres: Industrial metal; nu metal
- Length: 37:09
- Label: Reprise
- Producers: Wayne Static; John Travis

Static-X chronology
Start a War (2005)	Cannibal (2007)	Cannibal Killers Live (2008)

Singles from Cannibal
- 1. "Destroyer" Released: March 20, 2007; 2. "Cannibal" Released: August 19, 2007

Professional ratings
Review scores
Source	Rating
About.com	3.5/5 stars
AllMusic	2.5/5 stars
Blabbermouth.net	6/10
Collector's Guide to Heavy Metal	6/10
Decibel	6/10
IGN	7.7/10
PopMatters	6/10
Sputnikmusic	3.5/5 stars

Cannibal is the fifth studio album by American industrial metal band Static-X, released on April 3, 2007. This is the first album from the band to contain guitar solos; every song with the exception of "Goat" has one. Cannibal was the first album to be produced by John Travis, and the first album to not feature Ulrich Wild, who produced and/or mixed the band's first four albums, as well as the first not to feature a song with "Otsego" in the title. Lasting 37 minutes, it is the band's shortest album.

== Album information ==
Cannibal is the first Static-X album since 1999's Wisconsin Death Trip to feature full-time guitar playing from original guitarist Koichi Fukuda, who left the band in 2000 and rejoined in 2005 (Fukuda is credited as the guitarist on the 2005 album Start a War, but only contributed programming and additional guitars after Tripp Eisen's departure.)

Cannibal features an overall more straight forward heavy and aggressive sound when compared to the band's two previous albums. The last two previous albums Shadow Zone and Start a War had a more radio friendly sound featuring much cleaner vocals, more melody, and a slight toning down of the industrial metal elements. Cannibal features more screamed vocals from frontman Wayne Static. The album's sound is very similar to the sound featured on the band's first two albums, Wisconsin Death Trip and Machine, and the more radio-friendly sound the band had used on the albums Shadow Zone and Start a War is largely absent. The album is often regarded by fans as the band's heaviest album along with the band's second album Machine. This album is also the first Static-X album to be released through Reprise Records.

When asked about the album, Wayne Static said:

"I think it's the most metal record we've ever made, and it's arguably the heaviest record we've ever made. But with this record, I had a good time just getting back to balls-out screaming and challenging myself vocally, as well as in the songwriting. I felt like I was back working on Wisconsin Death Trip, where I focused on stripping away the excess as much as possible to write short, simple, catchy songs."

— Wayne Static

The first song released from the album was "Cannibal". However, the song "Destroyer" was released as the first single to radio, and a music video was made to accompany it.

The track "No Submission" is additionally available on the Saw III soundtrack. The title song "Cannibal" was released to iTunes on February 5 as a digital download single. "Destroyer" appeared later, on February 13 and appeared as an EP by March 20. The music video for "Destroyer" premiered on the internet on April 6.

While the title song "Cannibal" was inspired by Wayne's vegetarian thoughts of people eating meat, "Reptile" is simply about being eaten alive by a huge reptile. On January 18, 2007, a MySpace bulletin from the band revealed the track listing.

== Versions ==
The album is available in the standard 12-track edition (both clean and explicit), special internet edition with the bonus track "Get Up and Boogie", Best Buy edition with two bonus tracks ("Light It Up" and a remix of "I'm the One") and was briefly offered in limited supply with a booklet signed by members of the band. When downloading the album from the iTunes Store, another bonus track is included called "Beneath, Between, Beyond", which is also the title of band's only compilation album, even though the song was written two plus years after the album was released. This was also the first Static-X album to be released on vinyl. Spotify only carries the clean version of this album.

== Track listing ==
All tracks are written by Wayne Static, except where noted.

No.	Title	Writer(s)	Length
1.	"Cannibal"		3:13
2.	"No Submission"	Static, Tony Campos	2:42
3.	"Behemoth"		3:00
4.	"Chemical Logic"		3:51
5.	"Destroyer"		2:47
6.	"Forty Ways"	Static, Campos	3:01
7.	"Chroma-Matic"	Static, Campos	2:44
8.	"Cuts You Up"		3:26
9.	"Reptile"		2:31
10.	"Electric Pulse"		2:40
11.	"Goat"		3:48
12.	"Team Hate"		3:25
Total length:			37:09

Best Buy bonus tracks
No.	Title	Length
13.	"Light It Up"	3:11
14.	"I'm the One" (Wayne Static's Disco Destroyer Remix)	3:37

Warner Bros. bonus track
No.	Title	Length
13.	"Get Up and Boogie" (Silver Convention cover)	2:25

iTunes bonus track
No.	Title	Length
13.	"Beneath, Between, Beyond"	3:00

== Personnel ==
=== Static-X ===
- Wayne Static – lead vocals, rhythm guitar, programming
- Tony Campos – bass, backing vocals
- Koichi Fukuda – lead guitar
- Nick Oshiro – drums

=== Other personnel ===
- Wayne Static – production
- John 5 – first guitar solo on "Cannibal"
- John Travis – production and mixing
- Tom Baker – mastering
- Steven Gilmore – art direction, design, digital imagery
- Dean Karr – photography
- Eric Fincher – guitar/bass technician
- Johnny B – drum tech/monitor engineering

==== Assisting engineering ====
- Jason Gitlitz
- Assen Stoyanov

== Charts ==
The album debuted at #36 on the U.S. Billboard 200 with sales of about 30,000. and 98,000 by June of the same year.

Album

Chart performance for Cannibal
Chart (2007)	Peak position
Australian Albums Chart	26
Austrian Albums Chart	56
French Albums Chart	200
US Billboard 200	36
US Rock Albums	8
US Tastemaker Albums	11

Singles

Chart performance for singles from Cannibal
Song	Chart (2007)	Peak position
"Destroyer"	Hot Mainstream Rock Tracks	23
