= Dina Aschehoug =

Norwegian artist (1861–1956)

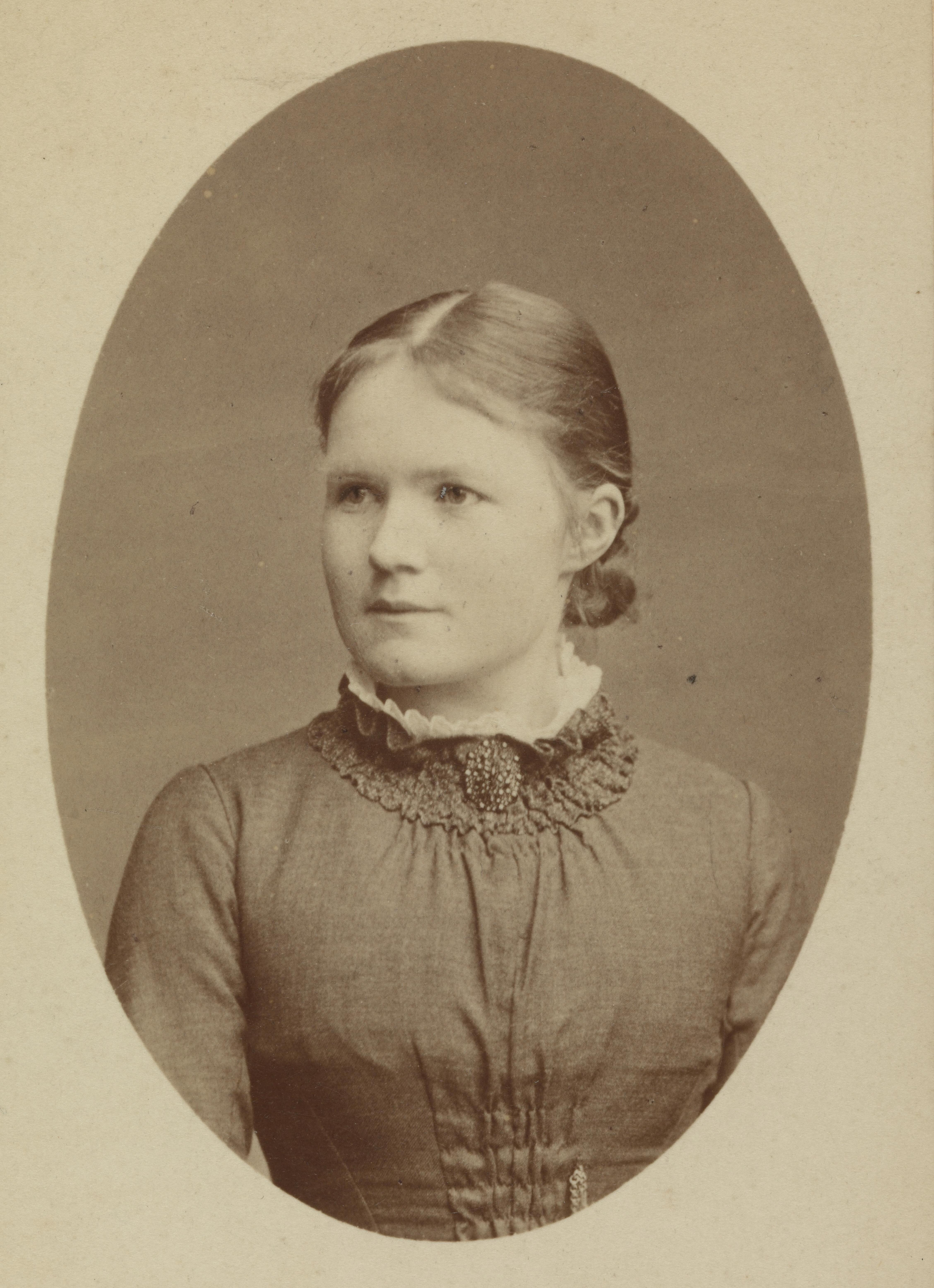
- Born: April 12, 1861; Rakkestad in Østfold, Norway
- Died: November 17, 1956 (aged 95); Oslo, Norway
- Education: Académie Colarossi
- Known for: Artist

Dina Aschehoug (12 April 1861 – 17 November 1956) was a Norwegian painter.

== Biography ==
Dina Engel Laurentse Aschehoug was born at Rakkestad in Østfold county, Norway. She was the daughter of Karen Margitte Danielsen (1834–1904) and Thorkild Johansen Aschehoug (1830–1902). Her father was a parish priest and brother-in-law of Torkel Halvorsen Aschehoug.

She studied at Vilhelm Kyhn's drawing school in Copenhagen between 1880 and 1882, and then became a student of Eilif Peterssen and Erik Werenskiold in Kristiania (now Oslo). She later studied at the Académie Colarossi in Paris and at the Art Academy School for Women (Kunstakademiets Kunstskole for Kvinder) in Copenhagen. In accordance with her parents' wishes, she sought employment as a teacher because her father thought art was an insecure way of life. For twenty years, she was a teacher at Sylow's School for Girls and the Women's Industrial School in Christiania (Statens lærerhøgskole i forming). In the years between 1911 and 1924 she lived in Copenhagen.

== Works ==
Aschehoug painted in particular interiors and portraits, and she created several altarpieces for Norwegian churches. In 1886, she painted the altarpiece of Rakkestad Church in Østfold and in 1889 she delivered the altarpiece to Hedenstad Church in Lågendalen. In 1897, her painting of Karen Stabell was entered at the General Art and Industrial Exposition of Stockholm (Stockholmsutstillingen 1897). In 1906 she painted an altarpiece for Komnes Church in Kongsberg. The altarpiece was subsequently moved to the nearby Efteløt Church.
