= S0 =

S0 may refer to:

- S0 Truss, an element of the International Space Station
- S^{0}, elemental sulfur
- IATA airline designator for Aerolíneas Sosa
  - Previously, IATA airline designator for Slok Air Gambia (disestablished)
- the representation of the number 1 in Peano arithmetic
- ACPI S0 power state in computing
- S0 galaxy, an astronomical code for barless lenticular galaxy
- S0, part of the name of certain stars within one arc-second of Sagittarius A*
- S0 (DIN 43864), an output from electricity meters that give pulses proportional to the amount of consumed energy
- the S0 interface bus used in ISDN BRI in telephony

== See also ==
- SO (disambiguation)
- 0S (disambiguation)
- 42nd Street Shuttle, signed as S but internally designated as 0
