= Rakkestad =

Rakkestad Municipality Rakkestad kommune
- Municipality
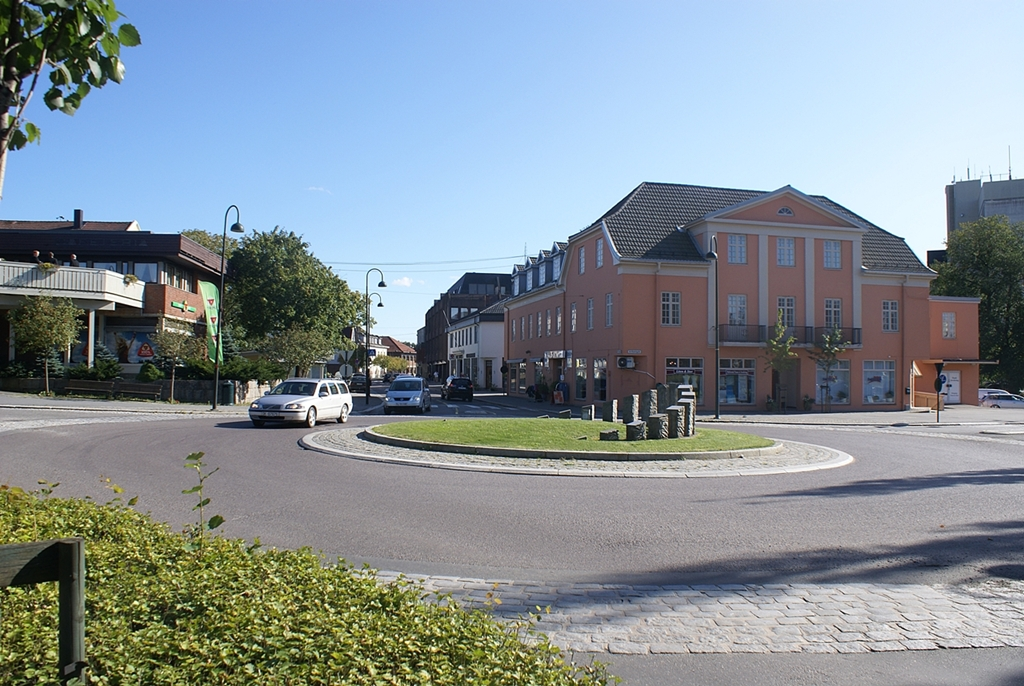

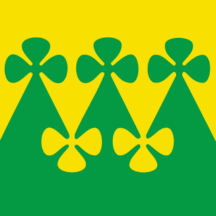
- Flag Coat of arms

- Østfold within Norway

- Rakkestad within Østfold
- Coordinates: 59°22′23″N 11°25′13″E
- Country: Norway
- County: Østfold
- District: Smaalenene
- Administrative centre: Rakkestad

Government
  - Mayor (2007): Peder Harlem (Sp)

Area
  - Total: 435 km^{2} (168 sq mi)
  - Land: 421 km^{2} (163 sq mi)
  - Rank: #227 in Norway

Population (2004)
  - Total: 7,232
  - Rank: #138 in Norway
  - Density: 17/km^{2} (44/sq mi)
  - Change (10 years): ▲ +2.2%
- Demonym: Raksting

Official language
  - Norwegian form: Bokmål
- Time zone: UTC+01:00 (CET)
  - Summer (DST): UTC+02:00 (CEST)
- ISO 3166 code: NO-3120
- Website: Official website

Rakkestad is a municipality in Østfold county, Norway. The administrative centre of the municipality is the village of Rakkestad. It is divided into the parishes of Rakkestad, Degernes, and Os. The municipality is the county's second largest by area and one of Norway's largest agricultural areas.

Rakkestad was established as a municipality on 1 January 1838 (see formannskapsdistrikt). Degernes was separated from Rakkestad as a municipality of its own on 1 January 1917, but it was merged back into Rakkestad on 1 January 1964.

Rakkestad has a civil airport, Rakkestad Airport, Aastorp.

== General information ==
=== Name ===
The municipality (originally the parish) is named after the old Rakkestad farm (Old Norse: Rakkastaðir). The first element is the genitive case of the Norse male name (nickname) Rakki and the last element is staðir meaning "homestead" or "farm".

=== Coat-of-arms ===
The coat-of-arms is from modern times. They were granted on 11 July 1975. The arms symbolize the fact that the main source of income in Rakkestad is agriculture. It shows a line of clover-shapes yellow on top and green on the bottom. The two lower leaves are symbols for the farming and forestry, and the upper symbolize the newer industries, trade, and crafts. The three standing clovers also represent the three parishes of the municipality: Rakkestad, Degernes and Os.

== Industry ==
Farming and forestry have always been important for settling and employment in Rakkestad. As a consequence the principal industries are growing grain, raising cattle, and dairy farming. Rakkestad has also developed a diversified economy based on agriculture and forestry such as poultry slaughterhouse and egg packing station, grain silo and mill, woodworking factories and agricultural machinery retailers. Traditional mechanical industry has developed into advanced technical industry directed towards the process, maritime, and offshore industry.

Number of minorities (1st and 2nd generation) in Rakkestad by country of origin in 2015
Ancestry	Number
Poland	204
Lithuania	143
Iraq	105
Kosovo	97
Bosnia-Herzegovina	74
Somalia	52
Sweden	46

== Nature ==
Rakkestad's areas of rolling, wooded hills offer year round recreational and leisure opportunities. There are marked forest paths for hiking and cross-country skiing.

=== Hunting ===
Rakkestad municipality offers small game hunting as well as roe deer hunting in the municipal forests, which cover about 18 square kilometres (7 mi^{2}). There are possibilities for farm lodging as well as cabin lodging.

=== Fishing ===
Landowners, angling clubs, and others put much work into cultivating waters and lakes to ensure good fishing. Most lakes are limed each year, with support from the government. Fry and fingerlings are also re-stocked annually. Where the cultivation is carried out with governmental funding, the fishing shall be available for all, either by free fishing or through open information about fishing licence and opportunities.

In Rakkestad more than 20 species of freshwater fish are registered. Many of these species lives in the Rakkestad River. The river meanders its way along, mainly through farmland, providing excellent river fishing for pike, roach, and perch.

Rakkestad is bordered to the west by River Glomma, Norway's largest river. At Sutern in Os there is an outdoor recreation area equipped with toilet, open shelters, and areas for making a campfire. You can fish for 26 different species from a small jetty or from land along the river. Fishing licence for the area can be obtained fróm self-service boxes along the river.

In the Rakkestad Hills a number of small lakes offer the angler to fish in sheltered solitude. Although the pursuit of the large trout draws a number of anglers to the lakes, you will only occasionally happen to meet fellow anglers.

Most lakes can be reached by a short walk from the car. Some of the forest roads are private and one has to pay a small fee in a self-service box, normally about NOK 20. Fishing licences can be obtained in the same place. Normal price for the fishing licence is about NOK 40 for 24 hours or NOK 200 for a year.

== Settlements ==
=== Ytterskogen ===
Ytterskogen is located in the agricultural area south of Rakkestad village and halfway to Ise. Ytterskog is also a noble family.

=== Degernes ===
Degernes is a village and parish.

== Attractions ==
=== Rakkestad Church ===
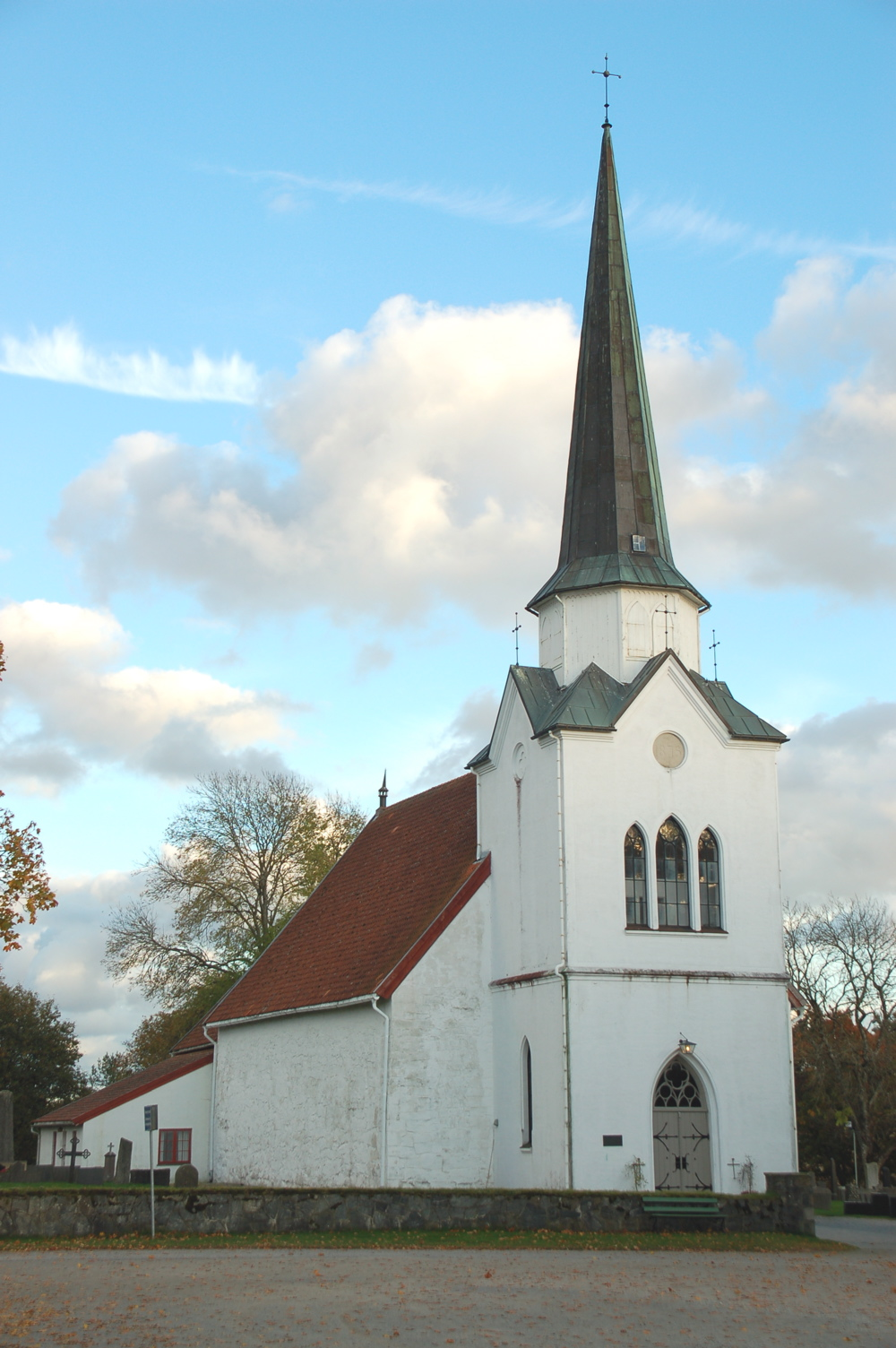
Rakkestad Church

Rakkestad Church (Rakkestad kirke) is a medieval era church. It was built ca. 1200. The Church is of Romanesque architecture style with rectangular ships and narrower and elongated choir. The building material is stone and brick. Rakkestad Church is first mentioned in written sources in 1370. In 1875, the church was extended with the sanctuary arch demolished and a new tower erected. The parish belongs to the Østre Borgesyssel deanery in the Diocese of Borg.

=== Linnekleppen fire lookout tower ===
A visit to the fire lookout tower on Linnekleppen is recommended. Located at one of the highest peaks in the county 325 metres (1,066.3 ft) it overlooks the whole county, parts of neighbouring counties, and parts of Sweden. It is staffed by a human fire lookout during summer months, when there is a higher fire risk. First established in 1908, it is the only currently active fire lookout tower in Northern Europe.

=== Rudskogen Motorsenter ===
Rudskogen Motorsenter is the oldest asphalt racing ground in Norway opened in 1990. In 2006, the government decided to make Rudskogen Motorsenter the main centre for automobile and motorcycle sport. The aim is to develop the centre to be a flexible facility where capacity can be increased and several different activities can be conducted simultaneously. In co-operation with Borg MC, Sarpsborg and Rakkestad municipalities Rudskogen Motorsenter will offer an environment for almost every series in automobile and motorcycle sport.

== Notable people ==
- Dina Aschehoug (1861–1956), Norwegian painter of interiors and portraits
- Helga Eng (1875–1966), psychologist, the third woman to receive a doctor's degree in Norway
- Odd Steinar Holøs (1922–2001), politician, Mayor of Rakkestad, 1955 to 1967
- John Thune (born 1948), politician, Mayor of Rakkestad, 1999 to 2007
- Bent Skammelsrud (born 1966), footballer, won 11 league championships with Rosenborg, 38 caps for Norway

== Gallery ==
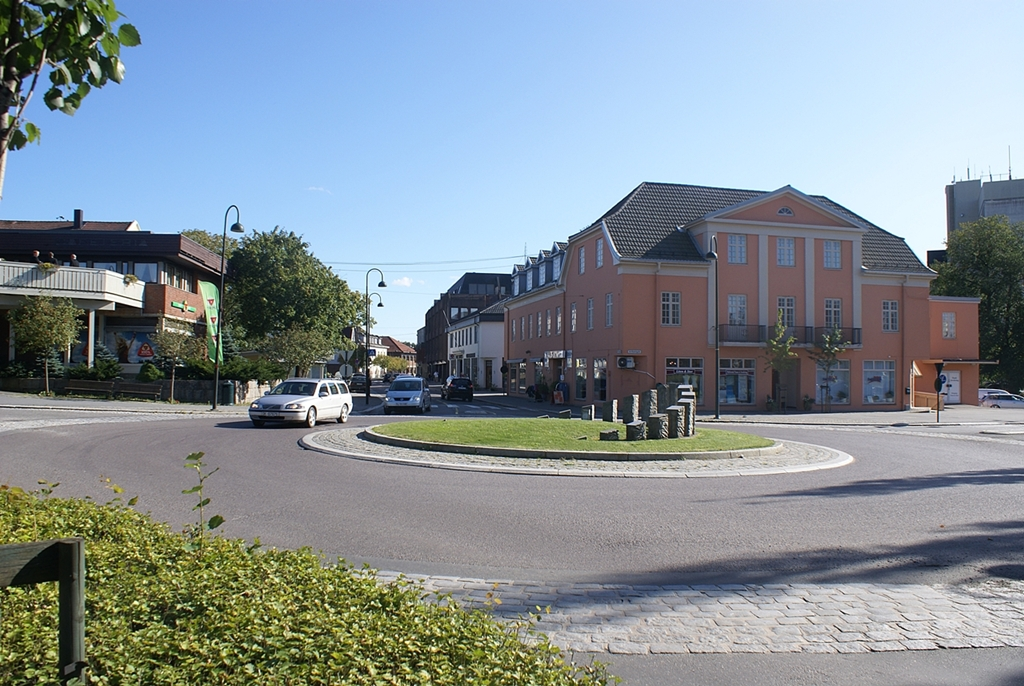
Rakkestad sentum

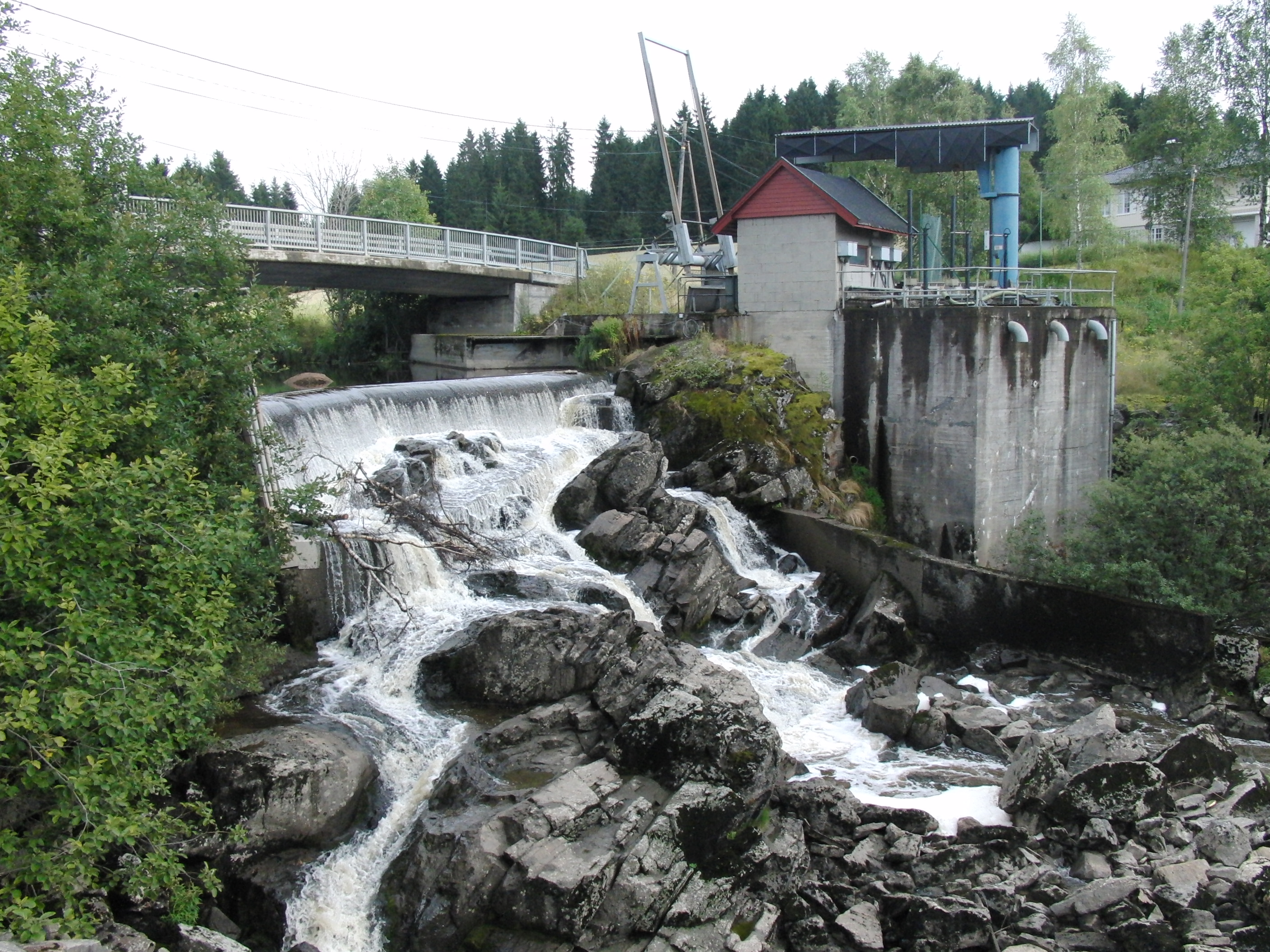
Haugaard kraftverk

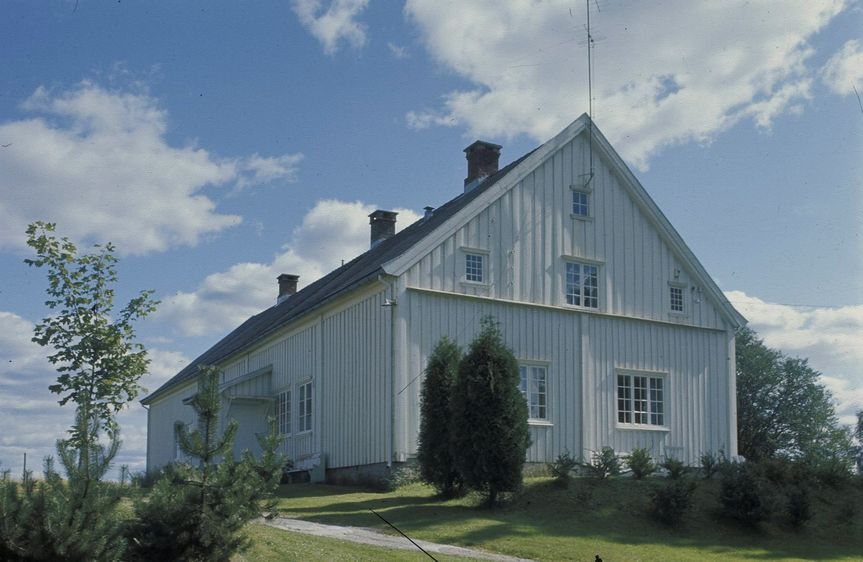
Rakkestad prestegård

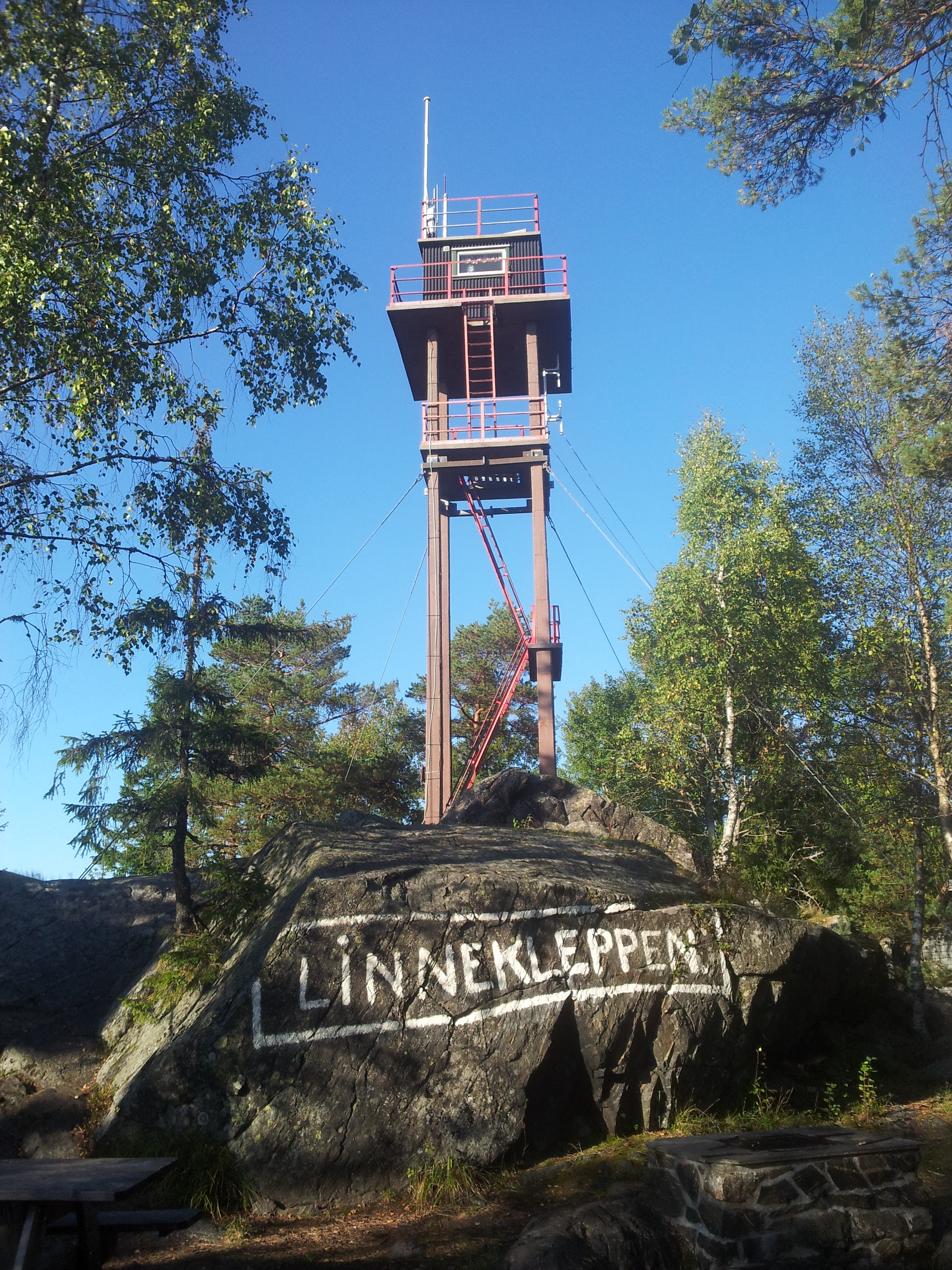
Linnekleppen
