= John Thune (Norwegian politician) =

Norwegian politician

Deputy Representative to the Storting
- In office 2001–2013
- Constituency: Østfold

Mayor of Rakkestad
- In office 1999–2007
- Succeeded by: Peder Harlem

Personal details
- Born: 2 February 1948 (age 78)
- Party: Christian Democratic

John Thune (born 2 February 1948) is a Norwegian politician for the Christian Democratic Party.

He served as a deputy representative to the Parliament of Norway from Østfold from 2001 to 2013.

On the local level Thune was the mayor of Rakkestad municipality from 1999 to 2007.
