= 0s (disambiguation) =

The 0s covers the first nine years of the Anno Domini era, which began on January 1, AD 1 and ended on December 31, AD 9, almost aligned with the 1st decade (1–10).

0s may also refer to:

- Tens (the second column of magnitude in the decimal system)
- The plural of 0
- The period from 1–99, almost aligned with the 1st century (1–100)
- The period from 1–999, almost aligned with the 1st millennium (1–1000)
- Any decade or the term decade in general

== See also ==
- 0S (disambiguation)
- List of decades, centuries, and millennia
