= 0S =

0S (zero S) or 0-S may refer to:

- 0s, the period from January 1, AD 1 to December 31, AD 9, almost synonymous with the 1st decade (1–10)
- The period from January 1, AD 1 to December 31, AD 99, almost synonymous with the 1st century (1–100)
- The period from January 1, AD 1 to December 31, AD 999, almost synonymous with the 1st millennium (1–1000)
- 0S, 0°S, or zero degrees south, coordinate for the equator
- Zero S, a model of electric motorcycle
- 0 set, or zero set, a concept in mathematics
- 0 sum, or zero-sum, a theory in games and economics
- 0 sharp, also zero sharp or 0#, a concept in set theory
- 0 section, or zero section, a type of section in a Vector bundle

== See also ==
- 0s (disambiguation)
- OS (disambiguation)
- S0 (disambiguation)
