= Wan-Ting Su =

Taiwanese artist

Wan-Ting Su (Chinese: 蘇琬婷; pinyin: Sū Wǎntíng) (born 1982) is a Taiwanese artist who grew up in Hsinchu, in North Taiwan. She has a M.F.A. degree from the Institute of Plastic Art of Tainan National University of the Arts. The Ministry of Culture of the Republic of China (Taiwan) selected her for an overseas program, Taiwan's Artists in Residence (A.I.R.), so in 2010 she lived and created works in America for several months. Wan-Ting Su is not only engrossed in painting but also interested in sculpture, installation art, and video art. Some of her works have been collected by galleries in both Taiwan and Australia. At present, she is a full-time artist who lives in Taichung.

== Art characteristics ==
In most of Wan-Ting Su's paintings, she depicts many irregular forms similar to seeds or micro-organisms in a "strange fantasy world". Some of her compositions look like different imaginative streams that converge or flow individually. The artist takes for granted that every life is so precious that she would like to proclaim its beauty and profundity.

== Education ==
- 2007 Tainan National University of Arts- Institute of Plastic Art (M.F.A)
- 2005 National Taichung Teachers College- Art Education, Taiwan (B.E)

== Honors ==
- 2011 Allowance of art creation, National Culture and Art Foundation, Taiwan
- 2009 Selected for Taiwan's Artists in Residence (A.I.R) program of Anderson Ranch Arts Center, America
- 2007 "Forest of Art- 99 Mountain Ecology" The Talent Foster Plan. Subsidy-Visual Art National Taiwan Museum of Fine Art
- 2007 The Artist of Stock 20 Taichung Railway station, Art Network of the Railway Warehouses Taiwan

== Prizes ==
- 2006 Participant's Award in 2006 Taipei Arts Award, Taipei Fine Arts Museum, Taiwan
- 2006 Selected by 2006 Taiwan New Arts-3D Creation, Taichung County Seaport Art Center, Taiwan

== Painting works ==
- Golden River：117x 90cm Acrylic on Canvas 2011
- Delicate Ping-Pong：100x100cm Acrylic on Canvas 2011
- Flying Red Snow：130x162cm Acrylic on Canvas 2011
- Happy Peck：130x162cm Acrylic on Canvas 2011
- Blogspot
- Youtube I
- Youtube II
- ArtTime

== Solo exhibitions ==
- 2013 Mystery Islands, A. Heritage Museum, Taoyuan, Taiwan
- 2012 Cheerful Buds in the Early Summer, Powen Gallery & Moons Art Gallery, Taichung & Hsinchu, Taiwan
- 2011 Sublime-Beauty, TAIYU Beaux Arts Salon, Chiayi, Taiwan
- 2011 Waltz in D Major, ACCTON HALLWAY, Hsinchu, Taiwan
- 2010 Symphonic Resonance of Ripples, Mayor’s House, Taichung, Taiwan
- 2007 Living for art－Infinity of Propagation & RegenerationSTOCK20, Taichung, Taiwan

== Group exhibitions ==
- 2013 ART TAINAN 2013, Tayih Landis Hotel Tainan, Tainan, Taiwan
- 2012 Seeing Landscape, TAIYU Beaux Arts Salon, Chiayi, Taiwan
- 2012 New Taiwan mural team Project -Urban guerrilla, Haushan1914, Taipei, Taiwan
- 2011 New Taiwan mural team Project -Urban guerrilla, Huwei Puppet museum, Yunlin, Taiwan
- 2011 Open Box-Doll Opening, Open Box Art Space, Taichung, Taiwan
- 2010 SEE YOU NEXT 10-2010 AVAT exhibition, TADA, Taichung, Taiwan
- 2009 Help Victims from Typhoon Morakot with ART Power, Impressions ART Gallery, Contemporary Hall, Taipei, Taiwan
- 2009 Duel Regard-The views from Taiwanese Woman Arts, National Taiwan Museum of Fine Arts, Taichung, Taiwan
- 2008 Art Fancy-2008 AVAT exhibition, 44 south village, Taipei, Taiwan
- 2007 Ending Exhibitions of Seventh Stations Artists, Stock20, Taichung, Taiwan
- 2007 Slowing Landscape, 99 peaks Art Ecological Park, Nantou, Taiwan
- 2007 Frolic: Humor and Mischief in New Taiwanese Art, Tenri Cultural Institute Gallery, NYC, USA
- 2007 Crossing over, Tiger Mountain, Nantou, Taiwan
- 2007 Taiwan International Orchid Show 2007- ART Installation, Taiwan. Orchid Plantation Tainan, Taiwan
- 2007 Daughter of champion Red, The Si Erba Art Space, Taichung, Taiwan
- 2007 2007 Daci Biennale, TNNUA, Tainan, Taiwan
- 2006 2006 Taipei Arts Award, Taipei Fine Arts Museum, Taipei
- 2006 2006 New Perspective Arts in Taiwan 3D Creation SeriesTaichung County Seaport Art Center, Taichung, Taiwan
- 2006 "Fall in love" dancing with the modern art, Quanta R&D Center, Taoyuan, Taiwan
- 2006 Love in the Mountains, TNNUA, Tainan, Taiwan
- 2005 The end of Group Exhibitions, TNNUA, Tainan, Taiwan
- 2005 Newborn Group Exhibition, TNNUA, Tainan, Taiwan
- 2005 Graduation Exhibition of Art and Craft Department of Education 94, NTCT, Taichung, Taiwan
- 2004 Nei-Jia-Dao environment art exhibition, PU-Li, Nantou, Taiwan

== Others ==
- Butterfly, Beauty of the world-12 anniversary of the earthquake 921 and paper church park opened the third anniversary of a series of activities Paper Dome Park Butterfly Art Build.

== Collections ==
- 2012 White Rabbit Gallery, Sydney, Australia
- 2011 TAIYU Beaux Arts Salon, Chiayi, Taiwan
- 2011 Open-Box Art Space, Taichung, Taiwan
- 2007 TAIYU Beaux Arts Salon, Chiayi, Taiwan
- Private collections

== See also ==
- Taiwanese art
