= Só =

Só may refer to:

- Só (poem collection), by Portuguese poet António Nobre
- Só (region), in what is now Bosnia and Herzegovina
- Banate of Só
