= ESO (disambiguation) =

The European Southern Observatory is an astronomical research organisation.

ESO may also refer to:

- Employee stock option (also: executive stock option)
- Ether Saga Odyssey, a fantasy massively multiplayer online role-playing game
- The Elder Scrolls Online, a fantasy massively multiplayer online role-playing game
- Existential second-order logic
- ESO (motorcycles)
- Eso (town), Orhionmwon, Edo State, Nigeria

== Organisations ==
- European Standardisation Organisations: CEN (European Committee for Standardization), CENELEC (European Committee for Electrotechnical Standardisation) and ETSI (European Telecommunications Standards Institute)
- Ensemble Studios Online
- Edmonton Symphony Orchestra
- Energijos skirstymo operatorius (ESO), Lithuanian electricity transmission network operator
- Evergreen Symphony Orchestra, an orchestra in Taiwan
- Eteläsuomalainen osakunta, a student nation at the University of Helsinki
- Libyan External Security Organisation
- External Security Organisation, the Ugandan external secret service
- École secondaire d'Oka, a public high school in Oka, Quebec, Canada
- National Grid Electricity System Operator (ESO), British electricity transmission network operator

== Music ==
- English Symphony Orchestra and English String Orchestra, two related classical orchestral ensembles
- Eso-Charis, Christian metal band (and self-titled album)
- Bliss n Eso, Australian hip hop group

== See also ==
- Esō, also known as Hyechong, a Korean priest who transmitted Buddhism to Japan
