= Os Church =

Os Church may refer to:

- Os Church (Innlandet), a church in Os municipality in Innlandet county, Norway
- Os Church (Vestland), a church in Os municipality in Vestland county, Norway
- Os Church (Østfold), a church in Rakkestad municipality in Østfold county, Norway
