= So and so =

So and so may refer to:

- So and so (or "so & so"), a placeholder name used for someone who is unspecified, unknown or whose name is forgotten.
- So and so (or "so & so"), a euphemism for an offensive or pejorative term, used in reference to a person or thing regarded as unpleasant or difficult, or whose name is not worthy of mention.
- So and so, (Heb. peloni almoni) is used in Hebrew literature as early as Book of Ruth 4:1 in reference to an unnamed relative of Naomi, Ruth's mother in law.
- So and so, the English translation of an Arabic phrase. The meaning is close to "somebody." The phrase can be encountered in the Hadith literature.
- So and So, a character from Teen Girl Squad, a Homestar Runner subcartoon.
