= Start a War =

Studio album by Static-X
- Released: June 14, 2005
- Studio: Glenwood Place Studios (Burbank, California)
- Genres: Industrial metal; nu metal; alternative metal
- Length: 48:04
- Label: Warner Bros.
- Producers: Ulrich Wild; Wayne Static; Tom Whalley (exec.)

Static-X chronology
Beneath... Between... Beyond... (2004)	Start a War (2005)	Cannibal (2007)

Singles from Start a War
- 1. "I'm the One" Released: June 2005; 2. "Dirthouse" Released: November 2005

Professional ratings
Review scores
Source	Rating
AllMusic	2/5 stars
Blabbermouth.net	7/10
Hit Parader	4/5 stars
PopMatters	6/10
Ultimate Guitar	9.3/10

Start a War is the fourth studio album by American industrial metal band Static-X, released on June 14 2005. A special version was shipped with an additional DVD titled X-Rated. It is the last album for 15 years to feature Ulrich Wild as a producer and/or a mixer, until Project: Regeneration Vol. 1 in 2020.

== Album information ==
This is the first studio album with drummer Nick Oshiro, and the second and final album with lead guitarist Tripp Eisen. He was fired from the band after being twice arrested for sexual contact with underaged girls. The album marks the return of guitarist Koichi Fukuda, who helped with programming and completed guitar parts for three songs left unfinished by Eisen. However, on the CD Fukada was credited as lead guitarist and band member, while Eisen was credited with “additional guitars”.

The album continues the change in sound found on Shadow Zone but many of the songs featured on Start a War are heavier have more screaming and aggressive lyrics. The whole tone of the album is more aggressive than Shadow Zone.

The song "Pieces" features a guitar solo, a feature not found in earlier albums, but playing a larger role in the following album, Cannibal. When asked about the album, Wayne Static said "We wanted to try to recreate the fun spirit of Wisconsin Death Trip; having Koichi back, with his flavor, helped."

The song "Start a War" was featured on the WWE SmackDown! vs. Raw 2006 video game soundtrack, and later on in Project Gotham Racing 3. "Skinnyman" was featured on Need for Speed: Most Wanted, though in a censored version. "I'm the One" was featured in Greg Hastings' Tournament Paintball, both the original version and the "Wayne Static's Destroyer Remix".

The album debuted at #29 on the Billboard 200, selling 35,416 copies in its first week.

This album had a confirmed total of 3 outtakes. This consists of songs that were reused in ‘Project: Regeneration Vol. 1’

These tracks are: ‘Hollow’, ‘Bring You Down’, and ‘Something of My Own’.

Some speculate two additional tracks, these being; ‘Road to Hell’ (demo of PR1’s ‘My Destruction’), and ‘Return of the Primitive’ (demo+vocals of PR2’s ‘Grover Yoda Data 14’).

== Track listing ==
All tracks are written by Static-X.

No.	Title	Length
1.	"The Enemy"	2:28
2.	"I'm the One"	2:36
3.	"Start a War"	2:44
4.	"Pieces"	2:38
5.	"Dirthouse"	3:03
6.	"Skinnyman"	3:40
7.	"Just in Case"	4:24
8.	"Set It Off"	3:55
9.	"I Want to Fucking Break It"	2:42
10.	"Night Terrors"	3:09
11.	"Otsego Amigo"	2:45
12.	"My Damnation"	4:01
13.	"Brainfog" (includes a cappella version of "Otsego Amigo" as hidden track, with a drum and bass finale)	9:53
Total length:		48:04

Japanese edition bonus track
No.	Title	Length
14.	"Get to the Gone" (Live)	3:03
Total length:		51:07

== DVD version (X-Rated) ==
Start a War was also available in a bonus edition digipak with a DVD titled X-Rated.

=== Band footage ===
Most of the DVD was filmed whilst guitarist Tripp Eisen was in the band. When he left the band, he had to be 'edited' out of the DVD, though he can still be seen in some shots. New live footage was filmed with Koichi Fukuda. Consequently, this means that most of the DVD has footage only of Static, Campos and Oshiro.

=== Contents of the DVD ===
- Making of the record. (Footage of the band making/recording the record and a footage of a photoshoot.)
- Recording segments from ‘Bring You Down’ Which was a track that was reused in ‘Project: Regeneration Vol. 1’ (only vocals were reused) The original was once a mystery, but has since been released in its original form.
- Rehearsal footage. (In order - "The Enemy", "Start a War", "I'm the One", "Dirthouse")
- Live tour footage. Each song also has footage of the band's crazy antics (in order - "Permanence", "The Trance Is the Motion", "Monster")
- "Desert Fun" - Wayne and Tony driving around the desert in trucks with the tracks "Otsego Amigo" and "I Want to Fucking Break It" being played.
- Instrumental songs ("Dirthouse", "Otsego Amigo", "Pieces", "Skinnyman", "Start a War")

== Personnel ==
- Static-X
  - Wayne Static – lead vocals, rhythm guitar, programming
  - Tony Campos – bass, backing vocals, lead vocals (11)
  - Tripp Eisen - lead guitar (Note: While Fukuda is credited with playing lead guitar, Eisen actually played most lead guitar on the album. Eisen was fired from the band after being arrested for sexual contact with underage girls, and Fukada rejoined as lead guitarist and made minor contributions to the album’s recording sessions. Thus Eisen was credited for "additional guitars".)
  - Nick Oshiro – drums
- Technical personnel
  - Wayne Static – production
  - Tony Campos – production
  - Ulrich Wild – production, engineering, mixing, programming
  - Tom Whalley – production
  - Daniel Wild – percussion
  - Steven Gilmore – artwork
  - Jason Freedman – sound effects
  - P. R. Brown – photography
  - Filmmakers – Troy Wallace, Matt Eidson, Richie Riot, Andy ** "Matahaji" Sandoval, John Toler
  - Tom Baker – mastering
  - Koichi Fukuda – programming

== Chart positions ==
Album

Chart performance for Start a War
Chart (2005)	Peak position
Australian Albums (ARIA)	52
Austrian Albums Chart	55
French Albums Chart	135
German Albums Chart	88
US Billboard 200	29

Singles

Chart performance for singles from Start a War
Song	Chart (2005)	Peak position
"I'm the One"	Hot Mainstream Rock Tracks	22
"Dirthouse"	Hot Mainstream Rock Tracks	27
