= Só (poetry collection) =

1892 collection of poems by António Nobre

Só ("Alone") is an 1892 collection of poems by the Portuguese poet António Nobre. It is the only work he published in his lifetime. Much of the collection was written while the poet was living in Paris. The poet called it the saddest work in Portugal. It became a landmark in Portuguese poetry, with a revised second edition published in 1898, two years before the poet's death.

== Publication history ==
Só (Alone) was first published in Paris by Léon Vanier in 1892. A revised second edition appeared in Lisbon in 1898.
