= ÖS =

Ös may refer to:

- Ös language, a Turkic language of Russia
- öS, the currency sign of the Austrian schilling
