= Association of the Visual Arts in Taiwan =

- 台灣視覺藝術協會
- Formation: 6 February 1999; 27 years ago
- Location: Taiwan
- Members: 910 (2014)

Association of the Visual Arts in Taiwan (AVAT; Chinese: 台灣視覺藝術協會; pinyin: Táiwān Shìjué Yìshù Xiéhuì) is a nationwide artist group in Taiwan for artists, curators, art critics, art theorists, art managers, art educators, art galleries, art agencies, and artist groups.

== Background ==
AVAT was stablished on 6 February 1999 and, in 2014, has almost 910 members. The mission statement of AVAT is "to serve artists". And in 2013, AVAT has his own space named "FreeS Art Space", which co-owner is Hantoo Art Group(1998).

Artist Fair Taiwan held annually by AVAT, this year's upcoming 13th. In 2013, AVAT Started a program named Taiwan Contemporary Art Archive, which is a website to establish database of Taiwan's contemporary artists, including a brief biography, resume, artistic concept, artwork information, and related art critiques. This archive expects to allow users to search what they need immediately as well as increasing the visibility of Taiwanese artists to be seen, be understood, and be invited by curators, experts, and researchers worldwide.

== Taiwan Contemporary Art Archive ==
The database is established as an internet platform offering information on Taiwan's contemporary artists – performance art, video art, new media art, installation art and photographic art, in both Chinese and English by AVAT in 2013.

The database is an open and organic platform under the principles of artists' easy access, spontaneous registration, and information synchronization, continuously establishing and presenting the complete artistic narrative of individual artist, including a brief biography, resume, artistic concept, artwork information, and related art critiques. It also adopts multiple keywords and systematic organization with easy access, allowing users to search what they need immediately as well as increasing the visibility of Taiwanese artists to be seen, be understood, and be invited.

This online archive collects 158 artists, 1,745 artworks 7,559 pictures and 442 videos, chosen by AVAT's team which including curators, art critics, art theorists, art managers.

== See also ==
- Association of the Visual Art in Taiwan
- Taiwan Contemporary Art Archive
