= Angelism =

Arguments that humans are essentially angelic

In theology, angelism is a pejorative for arguments that human beings are essentially angelic, and therefore sin-less in actual nature. The term is used as a criticism, to identify ideas which reject conceptions of human nature as being (to some degree) sinful and lustful:

"[Angelism] minimizes concupiscence and therefore ignores the need for moral vigilance and prayer to cope with the consequences of original sin."
