= So (Korean name) =

So (Korean: 소), also spelled Soh, is a Korean family name and a Korean given name.

== Family name ==
The Korean surname So is normally written with either of two hanja, indicating different lineages:

- 蘇 (되살아날 소; doesaranal so, 차조기 소; chajogi so): The largest bongwan is Jinju. This is the more common of the two lineages; the 2000 South Korean census found 39,552 people with this family name, belonging to 12,270 households. Most were located in Seoul (9,494), Jeollabuk-do (8,579), or Gyeonggi-do (7,144).
- 邵 (땅 이름 소; ttang ireum so, 성씨 소; seongssi so): The largest bongwan is Pyongsan, whose members trace the lineage back to Myeongjong of Goryeo. This is the less common of the two lineages; the 2000 South Korean census found 9,904 people with this family name, belonging to 3,096 households. Most were also located in Seoul (2,424), Gyeonggi-do (2,101), or Jeollabuk-do (1,189).
- 肖 (꺼질 소; kkeojil so): . The 2000 South Korean census found one person with this surname, living in Jeju-do, who was not a member of a household. There were also an additional 70 people who wrote their surname with the same hanja, but pronounced it Cho (초) instead; 39 of them lived in Jeju-do as well.

In a study by the National Institute of the Korean Language based on 2007 application data for South Korean passports, it was found that 91% of people with this surname spelled it in Latin letters as So in their passports, while 9% spelled it Soh.

Koreans with these family names include:

- So Chae-won (born 1997), South Korean compound archer
- So Chan-whee (born Kim Kyoung-hee, 1972), South Korean singer
- So Hee-jung (born 1973), South Korean actress
- So Hyun-kyung (born 1965), South Korean television screenwriter
- So Ji-sub (born 1977), South Korean actor
- So Joo-yeon (born 1993), South Korean actress
- June-Young Soh (born 1965), South Korean musical director
- Ky-Chun So (born 1958), South Korean theologian
- So Yi-hyun (born Jo Woo-jung, 1984), South Korean actress
- So Yoo-jin (born 1981), South Korean actress
- So Jung-hwan (born 2005), Member of Treasure

== Given name ==
People with the given name So include:

- Gwangjong of Goryeo (925–975), personal name Wang So

== See also ==
- List of Korean names
