= Destroyer (Static-X song) =

Single by Static-X

from the album Cannibal
- Released: March 20, 2007
- Recorded: 2006
- Studio: Bam & Share's House, Hollywood, California
- Length: 2:47
- Label: Reprise
- Songwriters: Tony Campos; Wayne Wells
- Producers: Wayne Static; John Travis

Static-X singles chronology
| "Dirthouse" (2005) | "Destroyer" (2007) | "Cannibal" (2007) |

"Destroyer" is a song by American industrial metal band Static-X and the lead single from their album Cannibal. The song was released digitally on March 20, 2007. On the U.S. weekly Mainstream Rock chart, it peaked at number 23.

On March 20, 2007, Static-X released the "Destroyer EP" exclusively at Hot Topic stores across the United States.

The song was featured in the commercial for WWE SmackDown vs. Raw 2008.

== Music video ==
The video was filmed on March 7 using two roller derby teams, featuring a 1970s theme. In the video, several illegal roller derby moves are shown - such as clotheslining an opponent and punching during a fight.

The band members appear in the video as themselves and other people attending the roller derby, all with penis innuendos for names: Wayne Static appears as the derby's announcer, "Dick Hurtz." Tony Campos and Nick Oshiro are coaches for the two teams, "Mike Rotch" and "Mon Keedick" and Koichi Fukuda appears as a crazed fan, "Don Keedick"; according to Campos in a 2024 interview, the names came from fake names the band used to use to check in to hotels.

== EP track listing ==
1. "Destroyer" — 2:47
2. "Cannibal" — 3:13
3. "Love Dump" — 4:20
4. "Push It" — 2:36
5. "I'm with Stupid" (Music video)

== Chart performance ==
| Chart (2007) | Peak position |
|---|---|
| US Mainstream Rock (Billboard) | 23 |
