= Cold (Static-X song) =

Single by Static-X

from the album Queen of the Damned: Music from the Motion Picture and Machine
- Released: April 29, 2002
- Genre: Industrial metal; nu metal
- Length: 3:40
- Label: Warner Bros.
- Songwriters: Wayne Static, Tony Campos and Ken Jay

Static-X singles chronology
"This Is Not" (2001)	"Cold" (2002)	"The Only" (2003)

"Cold" is the third and final single of Static-X's second studio album, Machine. An alternative version of the song was used on the Queen of the Damned soundtrack.

The song's video is a homage to Richard Matheson's classic 1954 horror novel I Am Legend. The video was directed by Nathan "Karma" Cox and Linkin Park's Joe Hahn.

== Track listing ==
1. "Cold" - 3:40
2. "Cold" (Mephisto Odyssey Remix) - 3:40
3. "This Is Not" (Live) - 3:39
4. "Cold" (Video)

== Chart performance ==
Chart (2002)	Peak position
US Billboard Hot Mainstream Rock Tracks	29
