= Dirthouse =

Single by Static-X

from the album Start a War
- Released: 2005
- Genre: Nu metal
- Length: 3:03
- Label: Warner Bros.
- Songwriter(s): Tony Campos; Tod Rex Salvador; Wayne Wells

Static-X singles chronology
"I'm the One" (2005)	"Dirthouse" (2005)	"Destroyer" (2007)

"Dirthouse" is a song by American industrial metal band Static-X. It is the fifth track and second single from their album Start a War.

== Chart performance ==
Chart (2005)	Peak position
U.S. Billboard Hot Mainstream Rock Tracks	27

== Music video ==
A music video was made and released in November 2005, features band playing at a rather dirty place, which is easily noticeable on drums which are all covered with ash. As the video progresses the loudness of the music causes dirt to fall from the light fixtures and ceiling. By the end of the video a thick layer of dirt is evident on the floor.
