= The Only =

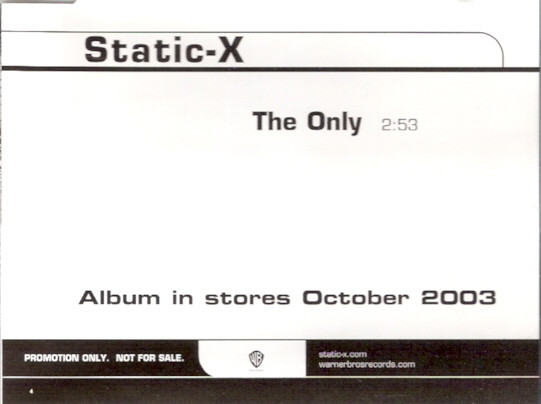

Single by Static-X

from the album Shadow Zone
- Released: September 2, 2003
- Genre: Nu metal; industrial metal
- Length: 2:51
- Label: Warner Bros.
- Songwriters: Tod Rex Salvador; Kenneth Lacey; Wayne Wells
- Producer: Josh Abraham

Static-X singles chronology
| "Cold" (2002) | "The Only" (2003) | "So" (2004) |

"The Only" is the lead single from the American industrial metal band Static-X's third album, Shadow Zone.

The song is featured in Need for Speed: Underground, and on the PC version of the game True Crime: Streets of LA, and in the 2003 MTV Video Music Awards as a background music for an announcer's speech. In Need for Speed Underground, the words "my heaven, your hell" have been replaced by "My heaven, you're losing".

The video was directed by P. R. Brown and features the band facing the walls of a small room with the camera orbiting around them. The walls are lifted by the end of the video revealing a crowd of fans around the room's floor.

It is considered by Emily Barker of NME to be the band's signature song.

== Reception ==
The song was declared to be the number one music video from the band by Billboard magazine in 2014.

== Chart performance ==
| Chart (2004) | Peak position |
|---|---|
| US Billboard Hot Mainstream Rock Tracks | 22 |
