= Black and White (Static-X song) =

Single by Static-X

from the album Machine
- B-side: "Anything but This"
- Released: 2001
- Recorded: 2000
- Studio: Studio 508 (Los Angeles)
- Genre: Industrial metal; nu metal
- Length: 3:50
- Label: Warner Bros.
- Songwriters: Tony Campos; Kenneth Lacey; Wayne Wells

Static-X singles chronology
"Bled for Days" (2000)	"Black and White" (2001)	"This Is Not" (2001)

"Black and White" is a single by the American industrial metal band Static-X. It is the first single from their second album, Machine released 2001. The music video for the song shows the band one by one waking up from a hypnosis state of mind, beginning to perform and then slowly turning into robots, resembling those seen in the Terminator movies. The video was directed by Len Wiseman.

== Track listing ==
1. "Black and White"
2. "Anything but This"
3. "Sweat of the Bud" (live)

== Black and White DVD ==
"Black and White" has also appeared in form of a DVD release which contained video for the track "Black and White", "Permanence" audio version and video snippets of "This Is Not", "Push It" and I'm with Stupid".

== Chart performance ==
Chart (2001)	Peak position
UK Singles (OCC)	65
UK Rock & Metal (OCC)	4
US Mainstream Rock (Billboard)	35
