= Machine (Static-X album) =

Studio album by Static-X
- Released: May 22, 2001
- Recorded: October 2000–January 2001
- Studio: Studio 508 (Los Angeles, California)
- Genres: Industrial metal; nu metal
- Length: 42:55
- Label: Warner Bros.
- Producer: Ulrich Wild

Static-X chronology
Wisconsin Death Trip (1999)	Machine (2001)	Shadow Zone (2003)

Singles from Machine
- 1. "Black and White" Released: 2001; 2. "This Is Not" Released: 2001; 3. "Cold" Released: April 29, 2002

Machine is the second studio album by American industrial metal band Static-X, released on May 22, 2001, and recorded at Studio 508 (Los Angeles). When compared to the band's other albums, Machine features more electronics and industrial effects, and more screamed vocals from Wayne Static. It was also the final studio album to feature all four original Static-X members, until 2020's Project: Regeneration Vol. 1 (which featured archival content left behind by Static after his death in 2014).

== Background ==
While the band toured Wisconsin Death Trip, Wayne Static wrote the entirety of this record by himself on the band's tour bus while the rest of the band partied. Because of this isolated effort, when the band went in to record the record, Static insisted that royalties for the album's sales would not be split an even four ways. This created tension in the band, leading to Fukuda's departure during the album's early recording stages, and his eventual replacement with Tripp Eisen. Static played all the guitars on the album and Eisen was only involved with the album's photoshoot.

== Promotion ==
The song "This Is Not" provided the album's first single and music video, and later a second single would be found in "Black and White". The song "Cold" also had a video made for it, and tied in with the film Queen of the Damned. It was featured on the film's soundtrack album, as was the exclusive "Not Meant for Me", performed by Wayne Static who replaced Jonathan Davis who sings it in the movie. The song "Anything but This", a bonus track from the Japanese version, is also found on the Resident Evil soundtrack. "Otsego Undead" was featured in the film Dracula 2000, as well as on its soundtrack.

== Reception ==
Professional ratings
Review scores
Source	Rating
AllMusic	3/5 stars
Blabbermouth.net	6/10
Collector's Guide to Heavy Metal	5/10
Drowned in Sound	8/10
Exclaim!	(mixed)
NME	7/10
PopMatters	(mixed)
Rolling Stone	3.5/5 stars
The Rolling Stone Album Guide	3/5 stars
Spin	6/10

Critical reaction to the album was mixed, the most positive reviews came from Rolling Stone, NME and Drowned in Sound. Terry Bezer of Drowned in Sound stated in his review that "It is impossible to put into words just how much Static X have progressed since their last effort. True enough, it's not the most original of sounds (think Ministry crossed with Slipknot) but it does have all the enthusiasm of a bull charging for El Matador's red cloth and twice the power."

Despite the mixed reviews, Machine sold around 500,000 copies in the USA, making it the band's second most successful album (after Wisconsin Death Trip) and was certified Gold by the RIAA on November 10, 2003, a month after the release of Shadow Zone.

== Commercial performance ==
Machine debuted at No. 11 on the Billboard 200, selling 83,000 copies in its first week, becoming a chart and first week sales best for the band. The album spent 14 weeks on the chart. While not as successful as the last album, Machine has sold around 500,000 copies in the US, making it the band's second most successful album (after Wisconsin Death Trip) and was certified Gold by the RIAA on November 10, 2003, a month after the release of Shadow Zone.

== Production ==
In the unreleased Static-X DVD Where the Hell Are We and What Day Is It... This Is Static-X, it was commented that the songs for the album would have guitar solos; however, this did not happen.

The opening sample of the track "A Dios Alma Perdida", a synthetic arrangement with a filtered voice speaking in what sounds at times like English (notably closing with an eerie "It's me!"), is from the 1978 film Laserblast. This sample is an abbreviated version of a conversation between the aliens in that movie.

== Comic book ==
A comic book series was created by Chaos! Comics entitled "Static-X Machine." Only one volume was made as Chaos! declared bankruptcy shortly after its release. The comic was packaged with a CD containing one track, "This Is Not (Live)," as well as multimedia content featuring back stage interviews with the band and a live music video of "This Is Not" from the 2002 Machine tour.

== Track listing ==
All tracks are written by Wayne Static, Tony Campos, and Ken Jay.

All versions
No.	Title	Length
1.	"Bien Venidos"	0:21
2.	"Get to the Gone"	2:49
3.	"Permanence"	4:01
4.	"Black and White"	3:50
5.	"This Is Not"	2:57
6.	"Otsego Undead"	3:29
7.	"Cold"	3:40
8.	"Structural Defect"	3:39
9.	"...In a Bag"	4:21
10.	"Burn to Burn"	4:17
11.	"Machine"	3:27
12.	"A Dios Alma Perdida"	5:58
Total length:		42:55

Japanese Edition bonus tracks
No.	Title	Length
13.	"Anything but This"	4:03
14.	"Sweat of the Bud" (Live)	3:24
Total length:		50:22

20th Anniversary Edition bonus tracks
No.	Title	Length
13.	"I'm with Stupid" (Live 2019 Regeneration)	3:27
14.	"Wisconsin Death Trip" (Live 2019 Regeneration)	3:11
15.	"Sweat of the Bud" (Live 2019 Xer0)	3:21
Total length:		52:54

== Chart positions ==
Album

Chart (2001)	Peak position
UK Albums Chart	56
Billboard 200	11

Singles

Year	Song	Chart	Peak position
2001	"Black and White"	UK Singles Chart	65
2001	"Black and White"	Hot Mainstream Rock Tracks	35
2001	"This Is Not"	Hot Mainstream Rock Tracks	36
2002	"Cold"	Hot Mainstream Rock Tracks	29

== Personnel ==
Static-X

- Wayne Static – lead vocals, guitars, keyboards, programming
- Tony Campos – bass, backing vocals
- Ken Jay – drums
- Tripp Eisen – guitars (credited but does not perform)

Additional personnel

- Ulrich Wild – production, mixing, engineering, keyboards, programming
- Koichi Fukuda – additional keyboards (6) (Note: On the original pressings of Machine, Koichi Fukuda is credited with additional keyboards on "Otsego Undead" and Tripp Eisen is credited with guitar, although it was widely known that Wayne Static played guitar on the album; however, on subsequent reissues, Eisen's name was removed from the liner notes while Fukuda was instead credited as both guitarist and keyboardist (and as a songwriter).)
- Tom Baker – mastering
- Troy Wallace – A&R
- Flem – art direction, design
- Eric Dinyer – artwork
- James McCrone – assistant mixing
