= Sō =

Sō, So or Sou (written: 宗 or 宋) is a Japanese surname. Notable people with the surname include:

- Shigeru So (宗 茂) (born 1953), Japanese long-distance runner, twin brother of Takeshi
- Takeshi So (宗 猛) (born 1953), Japanese long-distance runner, twin brother of Shigeru
- Sō Shiseki (宋 紫石) (1715–1786), Japanese painter
- Sō Sukekuni (宗 助国) (1207–1274), Japanese Deputy Governor
- Sō Yoshitoshi (宗 義智) (1568–1615), Japanese daimyō
- Sō Yoshiyori (宗 義和) (1818–1890), Japanese daimyō
- Sō Takeyuki (宗 武志) (1908–1985), Japanese aristocrat

Sō (written: 壮 or 創) is also a masculine Japanese given name. Notable people with the name include:

- So Aono (青野 聰) (born 1943), Japanese novelist
- So Fujitani (藤谷 壮) (born 1997), Japanese footballer
- So Hirao (平尾 壮) (born 1996), Japanese footballer
- Sō Kuramoto (倉本 聰) (born 1934), Japanese playwright and screenwriter
- So Matsuyama (松山 崇) (1908–1977), Japanese production designer
- So Nakagawa (中川 創) (born 1999), Japanese footballer
- So Nishikawa (born 2001), Japanese-Australian association football player
- So Taguchi (田口 壮) (born 1969), Japanese baseball player
- Sō Takei (武井 壮) (born 1973), Japanese athlete and television personality
- So Yamamura (山村聰) (1910–2000), Japanese actor
- So Okuno (奥野 壮) (born 2000), Japanese actor

Sō is the romanization of the uncommon Japanese surname written 曹 in Kanji, which derived from the Chinese surname Cao.

== Fictional characters ==
- So Inuoka (犬岡 走), a character from the manga and anime Haikyu!! with the position of (originally middle blocker) wing spiker from Nekoma High
- Sou Hiyori (日和 颯), a character from the game Your Turn to Die -Death Game by Majority-
- Sou Yaitabashi, a character in the Tetro Danganronpa: BLUE video series

== See also ==
- Sō clan
