= This Is Not =

Single by Static-X

from the album Machine
- Released: 2001
- Recorded: 2000
- Studio: Studio 508 (Los Angeles)
- Genre: Industrial metal; nu metal
- Length: 2:57
- Label: Warner Bros.
- Songwriters: Tony Campos; Kenneth Lacey; Wayne Wells

Static-X singles chronology
"Black and White" (2001)	"This Is Not" (2001)	"Cold" (2002)

"This is Not" is a song by the American industrial metal band Static-X. It is the fifth track and first single from their album Machine released 2001. The music video, directed by Atom Rothlein, shows a live performance of the track with the album version played over it. The song was also used in the video game Shaun Palmer's Pro Snowboarder.

== Track listing ==
1. "This Is Not" – 2:57
2. "...In a Bag" – 4:22

=== Live single ===
1. "This Is Not" (live) – 3:01
2. "Interview with Wayne, Ken, Tripp and Tony (multimedia)
3. "This Is Not" (live video) – 3:01

== Chart performance ==
Chart (2001)	Peak position
US Billboard Hot Mainstream Rock Tracks	36
