= Os, Østfold =

Parish in the municipality of Rakkestad, Norway

Coordinates: 59°27′04″N 11°14′18″E

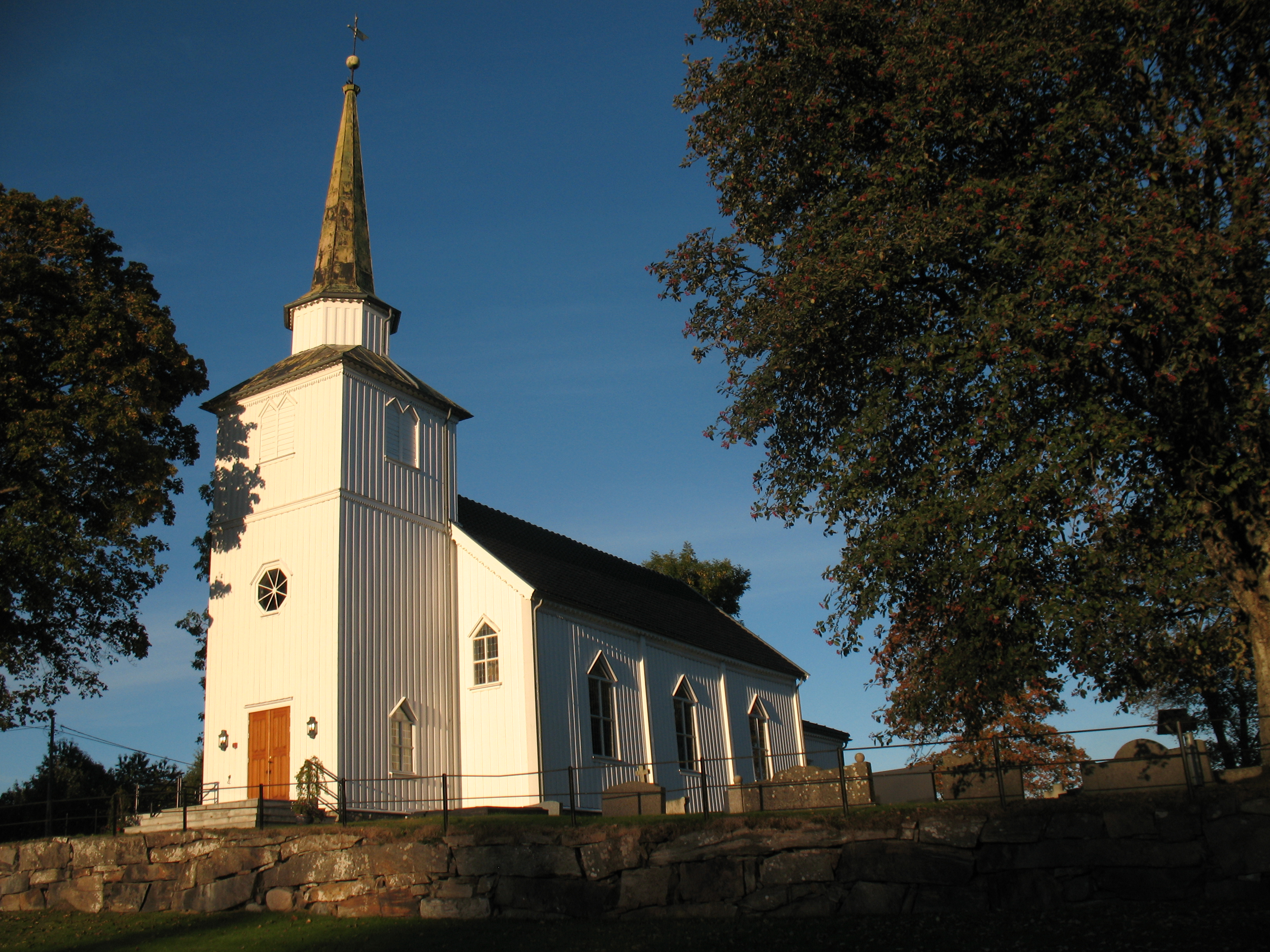
Os church

Os is one of three parishes in the municipality of Rakkestad in southeastern Norway.

The parish was separated from Rakkestad parish in about 1878. The parish, between Rakkestad village and Glomma, forms the northwestern part of the municipality, and covers an area of about 44 square kilometres (17 sq mi).
