= June-Young Soh =

South Korean director/musician (born 1965)

- 소준영
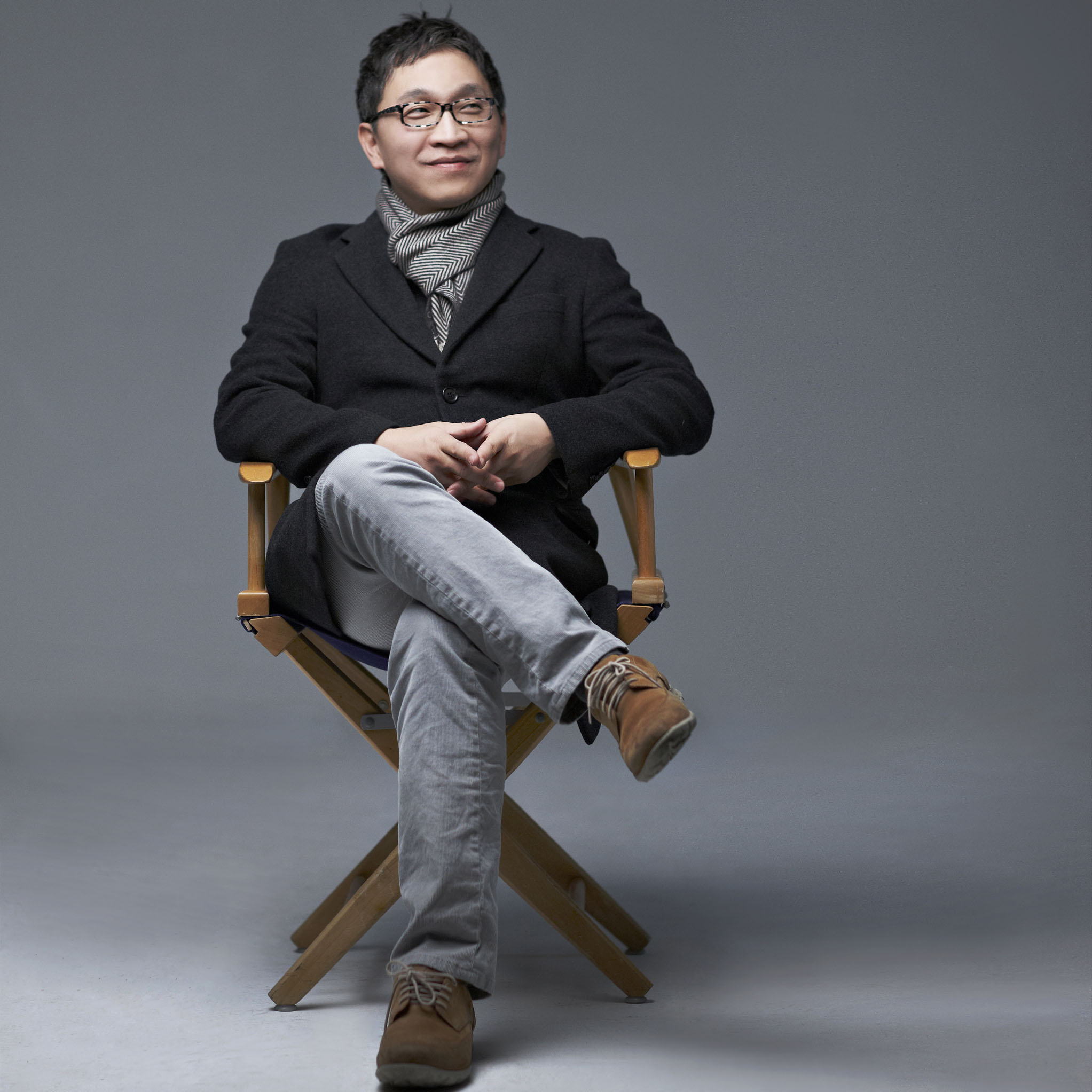
- Image of June-Young Soh
- Born: 15 January 1965 (age 61)
- Known for: The Lost Garden
- Television: Arirang Issue (Current Affairs)

Korean name
- Hangul: 소준영
- RR: So Junyeong
- MR: So Chunyŏng

June-Young Soh (Korean: 소준영; born 15 January 1965) is a South Korean director/musician who made his worldwide debut in Shanghai Mercedes-Benz Arena with the musical The Lost Garden on 8 June 2013. His current work, 'CHASA', is a circus based musical the story of which was derived from the old Korean myth; 'Chasa Bonpuri'.

Born and raised in Seoul, he became involved in rock music as a teenager; experiences in his first band, 'Since & Hence', has led him to become a professional musician in the later years. He became a professor at Seoul Institute of the Arts in his late 20s and released his first album with Warner Music Korea in 1993. It was not until 1996, he released his second album with Sony Music Korea. He released his third album, 'The paradise market' in April 2017.

Soh was involved in a number of exhibition productions earlier in his career including Taejŏn Expo '93 and Expo '98 where he worked as the composer/sound director of the main film of the pavilion. He established his 3D surround sound technics working in the pavilion environments during those early years. He further developed his ideas of 3D sound when he became the director of music and sound for the Korean pavilion of the Lisbon World Expo in 1998. His experimental 12.3 surround sound was best represented in the main film of the pavilion, 'Pearl Sea'; an underwater story of a woman diver in Jeju island.

Soh continued his experimental work in establishing 3D archives of Korean Nature Sound Samples(1999) & Korean Traditional Instrument Sample Library(2002) which were both sponsored by the Korean government. He shares his enthusiasm for studies of the Korean sound in his book, '산사의 종소리' which was published in 2006.
