= So (Static-X song) =

Single by Static-X

from the album Shadow Zone
- Released: 2004
- Length: 3:40
- Label: Warner Bros.
- Songwriter(s): Wayne Wells
- Producer(s): Josh Abraham

Static-X singles chronology
"The Only" (2003)	"So" (2004)	"I'm the One" (2005)

"So" is a song by American industrial metal band Static-X. It is the eleventh track and second single from their album Shadow Zone. It is also the last release with then guitarist Tripp Eisen.

== Chart performance ==
Chart (2004)	Peak position
US Billboard Hot Mainstream Rock Tracks	37

== Music video ==
The music video features the band performing in Studio 202 and various cut scenes to Wayne Static playing individually. It also features cut scenes of Wayne Static driving his truck. The video was directed by Darren Lynn Bousman.
