= I'm the One (Static-X song) =

Single by Static-X

from the album Start a War
- Released: April 26, 2005
- Genre: Nu metal; industrial metal
- Length: 2:36
- Label: Warner Bros.
- Songwriter(s): Tony Campos; Tod Rex Salvador; Wayne Wells

Static-X singles chronology
"So" (2004)	"I'm the One" (2005)	"Dirthouse" (2005)

"I'm the One" is a song by American industrial metal band Static-X. It is the first single from their album Start a War.

== Track listing ==
No.	Title	Length
1.	"I'm the One"	2:36
Total length:		2:36

== Music video ==
The video clip for this song contains all the members of the band playing music in a room with special effects added to the video clip to make appear as if the video is splitting apart. It was directed by P. R. Brown.

== Chart performance ==
Chart (2005)	Peak position
US Billboard Hot Mainstream Rock Tracks	26
