= Shadow Zone (Static-X album) =

Studio album by Static-X
- Released: October 7, 2003
- Recorded: March 2002–June 2003
- Genres: Industrial metal; nu metal; alternative metal
- Length: 39:26
- Label: Warner Bros.
- Producers: Josh Abraham; Tom Whalley (exec.)

Static-X chronology
Machine (2001)	Shadow Zone (2003)	Beneath... Between... Beyond... (2004)

Singles from Shadow Zone
- 1. "The Only" Released: September 2, 2003; 2. "So" Released: 2004

Shadow Zone is the third studio album by American industrial metal band Static-X, released on October 7, 2003. Marked by many personnel and stylistic changes, the album sports a much more melodic sound than any other work in their catalog, while still staying in the confines of their industrial metal and nu metal sound. It was the first of two albums to feature guitarist Tripp Eisen, and is the band's only album to not feature an official drummer, due to the departure of Ken Jay just prior to the album's recording sessions; drumming duties were subsequently handled by Josh Freese.

== Background ==
In 2002, Static would be contacted by Jonathan Davis of the nu metal band Korn. Davis had recently signed on to provide the soundtrack for the Queen of the Damned film soundtrack, but due to contract limitations with Sony, was legally unable to actually perform the music he had written for the soundtrack. As a remedy of this, Davis contacted a number of metal vocalists, Static included, to sing on the songs he had written. Static provided vocals for one track, "Not Meant for Me", with the Queen of the Damned soundtrack releasing in February 2002.

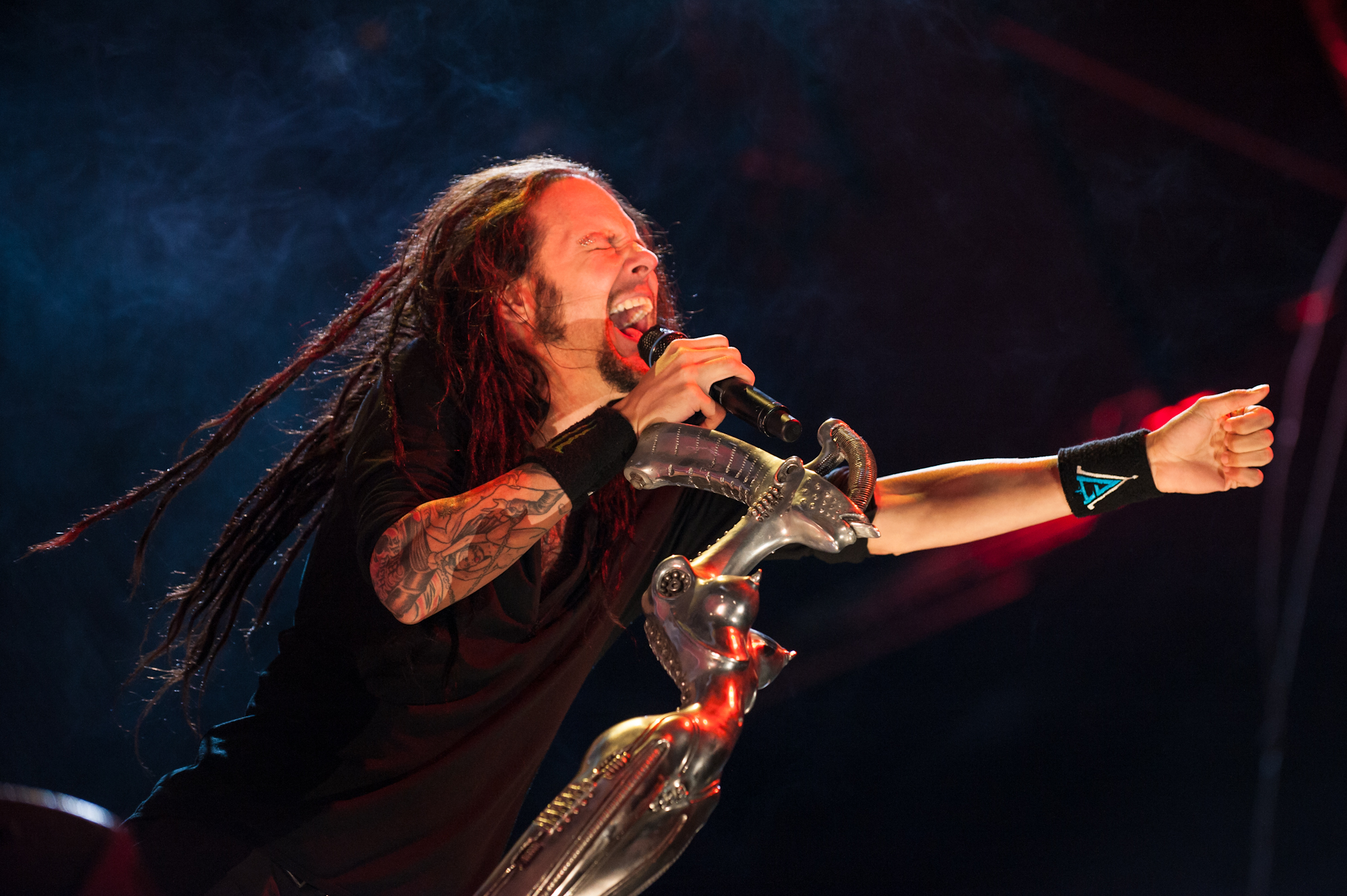
Static's work with Jonathan Davis of Korn greatly influenced the direction of the Shadow Zone album.

Meanwhile, prior to starting up sessions for a third album, tensions had grown high within the band. The band found success with their platinum-selling debut album, Wisconsin Death Trip in 1999, but dissatisfaction grew in the band in creating the follow-up, Machine in 2001. With their first album, the band had created it together, led by Static, whereas with the follow-up, the album was completely written by Static alone. Static had felt anxiety in being able to recreate the success of the first album, and resented the band for not helping him work on the second while touring. Concurrently, the rest of the band resented Static for leaving them out of the process when telling him they'd rather focus on touring. The move led original guitarist Koichi Fukuda to leave the band, and left the rest of the members largely upset with Static. Guitarist Tripp Eisen was brought in to replace Fukuda.

== Writing and recording ==
Work on the album started in early 2002, and would span well over a year. Writing sessions began during the last of the band's touring in support of Machine. By March 2002, the band had started their first jam sessions of the new material. Material would be demoed by the band in Static's home studio in Burbank, California. However, Static would concede that his early demos sounded very different from the album's eventual new direction. Static's contribution to the Queen of the Damned soundtrack would prove to be a turning point for the band. The track, which was much more melodic than much of the band's music up until that point, would attract the attention of Warner Bros. executive Tom Whalley, who pressured the band as a whole to pursue a melodic sound. Personnel and line-up changes would further alter the band's sound. The label would not allow the band to work again with record producer Ulrich Wild as they had for their prior two albums, instead arranging for them to work with Josh Abraham, a producer known for working with more commercially melodically mainstream bands such as Staind, Filter, and Velvet Revolver. The album would also be the only album to feature Josh Freese of the band A Perfect Circle, on drums. Freese was a last minute addition to recording, after the resignation of drummer Ken Jay, who quit two days before the band was scheduled to enter the studio to start the recording process, due to being unhappy with the direction the album was heading.

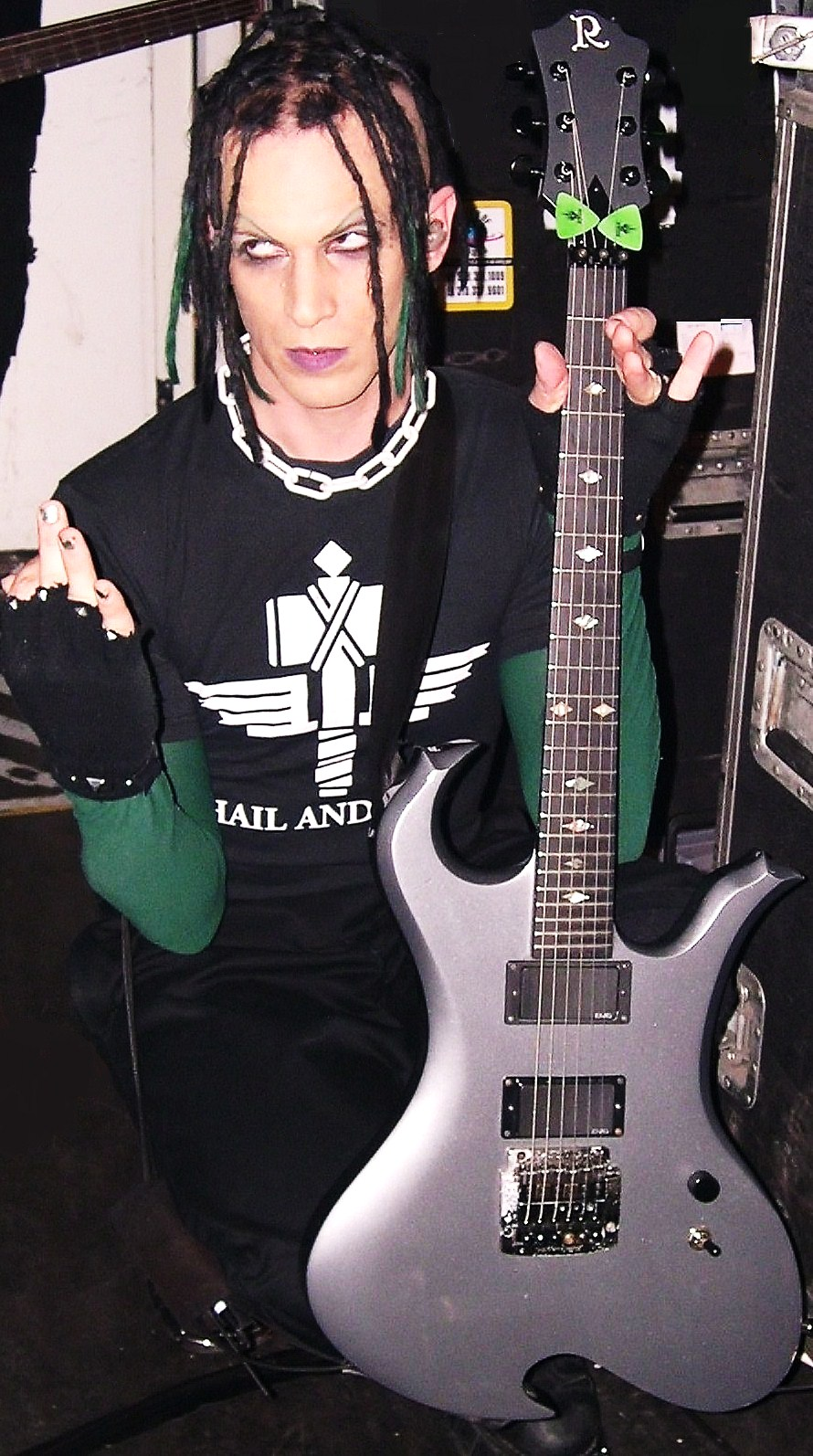
Tripp Eisen wrote about half of the album's material with Static.

All of this would fundamentally change how the band had worked on prior albums. The album would be the first to feature Eisen's songwriting contributions and performances, which was a change for the band, since Fukuda had not historically written material for the band, and Static had performed all guitar parts on Machine. Eisen wrote around half of the material for the album, though it was largely described by him as "a lot of collaborative efforts" between band members. Static enjoyed collaborating with Eisen in the sessions stating that his "punk rock attitude" was refreshing and brought a new approach and sound to the album; while Static typically was more of a "big picture" person, with this album, he let Eisen take control of many of the musical ideas while he focused more so on vocals.

The band had amassed over 20 songs by March 2003, with five being revealed by name - "Shadow Zone", "The Only", "New Pain", "Deliver Me", and "Breathe". Freese joined the sessions later, once the band had ironed out which songs were likely to make the cut. Prior albums employed the use of drum machines with Jay's live cymbals edited in afterwards, whereas for Shadow Zone, the band opted to do the opposite; they wrote and demoed the songs with a drum machine, but chose to use Freese's live drums after being very impressed with his work. Freese completed all of his drum parts in three days, even though he had never heard a single song prior to the sessions. Static explained his experience with Freese:

The dude is just amazing. It changed my life and it changed my perspective on drummers. We played the demo for him twice and he'd take down a couple of notes and then we'd run through the songs three times and then that was it and then we'd move onto the next song. We did three or four songs a day and then in three days we were done. I really got goose bumps on some of the shit he was doing. That was why I was willing to change things up and have the drummer come in and really be a part of things. Everything kind of changed and went in that different direction."

Recording sessions wrapped up by June 2003. While the band was unable to retain Wild as a producer, they were able to secure him for the album's final mixing process.

== Sound ==
While the album was still described commonly as industrial metal, nu metal, alternative metal, much like the rest of their work, Shadow Zone focused much more on melody than any other album in their catalog.

Static's vocal performance on Shadow Zone was commonly compared by journalists as similar to Jonathan Davis of Korn. Allmusic also felt that his vocals on the second single, "So", sounded similar to the vocals of Layne Staley of Alice in Chains.

== Release and promotion ==
Recording the album wrapped up in June 2003, Nick Oshiro, prior drummer of the band Seether, joined the band shortly after the recording process to tour in support of the album, as Freese was always meant to just be a temporary session drummer for the album’s creation. The album's first single, "The Only", was released to radio in August 2003. Shadow Zone was released on October 7, 2003. A second single, "So", was later released in 2004.

== Reception ==
Professional ratings
Review scores
Source	Rating
AllMusic	2/5 stars
Blender	3/5 stars
Collector's Guide to Heavy Metal	4/10
IGN	3.0/10
Melodic	2.5/5 stars
The Rolling Stone Album Guide	2/5 stars

The album debuted at no. 20 on the Billboard 200 charts, selling 48,418 copies in its first week, just over half the number of their prior album, Machine. By January 2004, the album had sold 179,051 copies.

== Track listing ==
All tracks are written by Wayne Static and Tripp Eisen, except where noted.

Tracks
No.	Title	Writer(s)	Length
1.	"Destroy All"		2:18
2.	"Control It"	Static, Eisen, Tony Campos, Ken Jay	3:05
3.	"New Pain"		2:57
4.	"Shadow Zone"		3:05
5.	"Dead World"		2:47
6.	"Monster"		2:14
7.	"The Only"	Static, Eisen, Jay	2:51
8.	"Kill Your Idols"		4:00
9.	"All in Wait"	Static, Jay	4:01
10.	"Otsegolectric"		2:39
11.	"So"	Static	3:40
12.	"Transmission"	Static, Eisen, Campos, Jay	1:38
13.	"Invincible"	Static, Eisen, Jay	4:05
Total length:			39:26

Japanese edition bonus track
No.	Title	Writer(s)	Length
14.	"Gimme Gimme Shock Treatment" (The Ramones cover)	Dee Dee Ramone, Johnny Ramone	2:03
Total length:			41:29

== Personnel ==
Personnel per liner notes.

Static-X

- Wayne Static – lead vocals, rhythm guitar, keyboards, programming
- Tripp Eisen – lead guitar
- Tony Campos – bass, backing vocals
- Nick Oshiro – drums (credited but does not perform)

Session musicians

- Josh Freese – drums
- Ken Jay – additional keyboards

Production

- Josh Abraham – production
- Steven Gilmore – artwork
- Ulrich Wild – mixing
- Ryan Williams – engineer
- Tom Whalley – executive producer

== Charts ==
Album

Chart performance for Shadow Zone
Chart (2003)	Peak position
Australian Albums (ARIA)	66
French Albums Chart	110
German Albums Chart	79
UK Albums Chart	113
US Billboard 200	20

Singles

Chart performance for singles from Shadow Zone
Song	Chart (2003)	Peak position
"The Only"	Hot Mainstream Rock Tracks	22
"So"	Hot Mainstream Rock Tracks	37
