= The Death Trip Continues =

EP by Static-X
- Released: 2000
- Recorded: 1998–2000
- Venue: Troubadour, West Hollywood, California (track 4)
- Studio: Master Control, Los Angeles, California (tracks 1–3, 6 and 7); Chicago Recording Company, Chicago, Illinois track 5)
- Genre: Industrial metal; nu metal
- Length: 30:01
- Label: Warner Bros.
- Producer: Ulrich Wild; Wayne Static; Static-X

Static-X chronology
Wisconsin Death Trip (1999)	The Death Trip Continues (2000)	Machine (2001)

The Death Trip Continues... is the first EP by American industrial metal band Static-X, released in 2000. It is a follow-up to their debut album, Wisconsin Death Trip. This EP was a promo CD only and was not available in stores.

The cover of "Burning Inside" along with the songs "So Real" and "S.O.M." were later released on the 2004 compilation Beneath... Between... Beyond.... "Burning Inside" also appeared on the soundtrack to the film The Crow: Salvation.

== Track listing ==
All tracks are written by Static-X, except where noted.

No.	Title	Length
1.	"Love Dump" (Edit)	3:20
2.	"Love Dump" (Mephisto Odyssey's Voodoo Mix)	5:28
3.	"Bled for Days" (Album Version)	3:46
4.	"Bled for Days" (Live)	4:04
5.	"Burning Inside" (Ministry cover; featuring Burton C. Bell)	4:18
6.	"So Real"	5:41
7.	"S.O.M"	3:24
Total length:		30:01

== Personnel ==
Credits adapted from liner notes

Static-X

- Wayne Static – lead vocals, rhythm guitar
- Koichi Fukuda – lead guitar, keyboards, programming
- Tony Campos – bass, backing vocals
- Ken Jay – drums

Additional

- Wayne Static – additional production on tracks 4 to 7
- Burton C. Bell – additional vocals on track 5
- Ulrich Wild – production and mixing on tracks 1, 3, 4, 6, 7, engineer on tracks 1, 3, 6, 7
- Static-X – additional production on tracks 1 and 3
- Biff Dawes – engineering on track 4
- Chris Sheppard – engineering and mixing on track 5
- Bill Douglas – additional engineering on track 5
- Bruce Reiter – additional engineering on track 5
