= Beneath... Between... Beyond... =

2004 compilation album by Static-X

Compilation album by Static-X
- Released: July 20, 2004
- Recorded: 1996–2002
- Genre: Industrial metal; nu metal; alternative metal
- Length: 61:18
- Label: Warner Bros.
- Producer: Josh Abraham; Ulrich Wild; Wayne Static; Koichi Fukuda; Mephisto Odyssey; Tom Whalley (exec.)

Static-X chronology
Shadow Zone (2003)	Beneath... Between... Beyond... (2004)	Start a War (2005)

Professional ratings
Review scores
Source	Rating
AllMusic	2/5 stars
Hit Parader	B+
The Rolling Stone Album Guide	2/5 stars

Beneath... Between... Beyond... is the compilation album by American industrial metal band Static-X, released on July 20, 2004, through Warner Bros. Records. It is a compilation of previously unreleased tracks, remixes, cover versions, and the band's original demo tracks. The band did some touring in support of the album.

== Background ==
In a 2004 Metal Edge feature on the compilation, frontman Wayne Static explained that the idea for Beneath... Between... Beyond... came about due to fan enquiries about songs "that appeared on some soundtrack for some old movie", and questions about where these songs were. As most of the CDs the rare songs were featured on had gone out of print, Static-X decided to release a compilation album to make them more accessible to fans. To make the release more special for hardcore fans, the band decided to include never-heard-before demo tracks that were recorded at the band's rehearsal space in Los Angeles, to "give all of you an idea of how a song evolves from its demo form, to the finished recording you hear on one of our albums".

== Content and songs ==
Beneath... Between... Beyond... is composed of previously unreleased tracks, cover versions, and original Static-X demo tracks, dating back as far as 1996. Although the song "Crash" (featured on Mephisto Odyssey's The Deep Red Connection in 2000) is "not completely a Static-X song", Static opted to include it on Beneath... Between... Beyond... due to his and (then-former) guitarist Koichi Fukuda's involvement with its production.

=== Outtakes ===
"S.O.M.", "Down", "Head" and "So Real" were part of the 16 songs that Static-X recorded in 1998 for the band's debut album Wisconsin Death Trip (1999), and out of 25 that were written for the album. After selecting the album's twelve songs, the band decided to keep the unused tracks "for future use". "S.O.M." ("Symptoms of Mercy"), which Static and bassist Tony Campos both considered to be one of their favourite songs from the Wisconsin Death Trip sessions, features heavy guitar riffing inspired by Crowbar. Static described "Down" as "a killer mixture of drum-and-bass style with pure metal shredding" and stated that it was inspired by the Slayer/Atari Teenage Riot collaboration "No Remorse (I Wanna Die)", from Spawn: The Album (1997). "So Real" was primarily composed by Static and Fukuda, with Campos contributing something at the end of the song at the band's request. "S.O.M." was featured on an MTV compilation, Return of the Rock, whilst "So Real" was included in the soundtrack for Scream 3 (2000).

"Anything But This" was written and recorded during the recording sessions for Static-X's second album, Machine (2001), in December 2000. The song features lots of screaming and double-kick drums as well as an unexpected transition to clean guitars on the chorus, which (in a rare instance) features Campos singing the entire chorus. Static considered the song to be "the heaviest, most brutal thing [Static-X] ever put down on tape", noting that he lost his voice tracking vocals for it. "Breathe" was also written during the Machine sessions by Static, who left it off the album as he felt it did not fit in with the rest of the material. It resurfaced during recording sessions for the band's third album, Shadow Zone (2003), and the band "threw ideas into [the song] the make the finished version", according to Eisen. Considering it reminiscent of Prong, Campos attempted to convince the band to get Prong frontman Tommy Victor to do vocals for the song, but "no one took [him] seriously". "Deliver Me" originated from a demo that guitarist Tripp Eisen was working on that Static liked. It was one of Campos' favourite songs from the Shadow Zone sessions, and he wanted to include the song on the album, whilst Eisen felt it was better suited to a soundtrack album. The song ultimately ended up on the soundtrack of the 2003 remake of The Texas Chainsaw Massacre.

=== Remixes ===
Beneath... Between... Beyond... includes two remixes of the band's singles "Push It" and "I'm With Stupid", by then-Fear Factory touring keyboardist John Bechdel and Ministry bassist Paul Barker, respectively. After meeting him in New York, Wayne Static asked Barker to do a remix of "I'm With Stupid", which came out "sounding like a cool mix of Static-X and Ministry", according to Static. The "Push It (JB's Death Trace Mix)" appeared on the Push It EP (which also includes "Down"), whilst the "I'm With Stupid (Paul Barker Mix)" was included in a Warner Bros. sampler release.

=== Cover songs ===
The compilation features three cover songs: "Burning Inside" (by Ministry), "Behind the Wall of Sleep" (by Black Sabbath) and "Gimme Gimme Shock Treatment" (by the Ramones). "Burning Inside" was recorded as a duet with then-Fear Factory frontman Burton C. Bell during a break in the 1999 Ozzfest Tour, and the song itself was a fixture of Static-X's live setlists during the Machine tour. According to Bell, Static was unsure of the song's lyrics and had to look them up online, but felt that he got "fairly close" to them. The track was first released on the soundtrack to The Crow: Salvation. The band contributed "Behind the Wall of Sleep" to the Black Sabbath tribute album Nativity in Black 2 (2000). The band recorded the song's guitar and bass tracks using a "little cigarette box amplifier"; as the band did not have a wah-wah pedal at the time, they got their sound engineer, Bruce Reiter, to "hold the little amp up to his mouth while he opened and closed it!", according to Static. "Gimme Gimme Shock Treatment" was recorded in 2002 for We're a Happy Family: A Tribute to Ramones, but was omitted from the album "because they had too many songs", according to Static. The song was later added as a bonus track to the Japanese release of Shadow Zone. It was the band's first song recorded with Tripp Eisen, and the last song that original Static-X drummer Ken Jay performed on before his departure from the band later that year (although he would later rejoin in 2018).

=== Demos ===
"I Am" and "Love Dump" (which would later appear on Wisconsin Death Trip) were recorded for Static-X's first six-song demo in 1996 by Static, Campos and Jay, which was later used to get the band signed to Warner Bros. Although he was not a member of Static-X when the demos were recorded, Koichi Fukuda was listed in the demo's liner notes as he was a member of Static-X by the time the band started distributing them. The "Get to the Gone" demo (from Machine) was recorded by Static, Campos and Jay as part of a rehearsal tape for producer Ulrich Wild in late 2000, following Fukuda's departure from the band. The demos for "New Pain" and "Otsegolectric" (from Shadow Zone) were demoed with a Akai MPC 2000 drum machine, and Static noted the "rigidity" of the demos compared to their album version counterparts. "Otsegolectric" features an extended intro with a sample, whilst Eisen stated that "New Pain" was "a real work in progress" at the time of its recording, and that it would "[morph] a lot from [its] original concept". These demos were among those that were played for Josh Freese, who would become the session drummer for Shadow Zone.

== Track listing ==
No.	Title	Writer(s)	Producer(s)	Length
1.	"Breathe"	Wayne Static; Tripp Eisen; Ken Jay; Tony Campos	Josh Abraham	2:32
2.	"Deliver Me"	Static; Eisen	Abraham	2:37
3.	"Anything But This"	Static	Ulrich Wild; Wayne Static	4:03
4.	"S.O.M." ("Symptoms of Mercy")	Static; Jay	Wild	3:22
5.	"Down"	Static; Jay; Koichi Fukuda	Wild	3:15
6.	"Head"	Static; Jay	Wild	2:46
7.	"So Real"	Static; Fukuda	Wild	5:40
8.	"Crash" (by Mephisto Odyssey)	Static; Johnston; Journette	Mephisto Odyssey; Static; Koichi Fukuda	3:35
9.	"Push It" (JB's Death Trance Mix)	Static	Wild	3:32
10.	"I'm with Stupid" (Paul Barker Remix)	Static; Jay	Wild	4:32
11.	"Burning Inside" (Ministry cover) (featuring Burton C. Bell)	Al Jourgensen; Chris Connelly; Barker; Bill Rieflin	Static	4:14
12.	"Behind the Wall of Sleep" (Black Sabbath cover)	Bill Ward; Ozzy Osbourne; Geezer Butler; Tony Iommi	Static	3:32
13.	"Gimme Gimme Shock Treatment" (Ramones cover)	Douglas Colvin; John Cummings	Wild; Static	2:03
14.	"I Am (demo)"	Static; Campos	Static	2:55
15.	"Love Dump (demo)"	Static	Static	4:28
16.	"Get to the Gone (demo)"	Static; Campos	Static	2:30
17.	"New Pain (demo)"	Static; Eisen	Static	2:49
18.	"Otsegolectric (demo)"	Static; Eisen	Static	2:53
Total length:				61:18

== Chart positions ==
Chart (2004)	Peak position
French Albums Charts	169
The Billboard 200	139

== Credits ==
=== Static-X ===
- Wayne Static – lead vocals, rhythm guitar, keyboards, programming
- Tripp Eisen – lead guitar
- Tony Campos – bass, backing vocals, vocals (3)
- Nick Oshiro – drums

==== Additional personnel ====
- Koichi Fukuda – lead guitar, keyboards, programming
- Ken Jay – drums
- Josh Freese – drums
