= I'm with Stupid (Static-X song) =

Single by Static-X

from the album Wisconsin Death Trip
- Released: February 11, 2000
- Recorded: 1998
- Studio: Grandmaster Studios, Hollywood, California
- Genre: Industrial metal; nu metal
- Length: 3:24 (album version)
- Label: Warner Bros.
- Songwriters: Tony Campos; Koichi Fukuda; Kenneth Lacey; Wayne Wells
- Producer: Ulrich Wild

Static-X singles chronology
"Push It" (1999)	"I'm with Stupid" (2000)	"Bled for Days" (2000)

Music video
- "I'm With Stupid" on YouTube

"I'm with Stupid" (released as a single under the name of "I'm with Stupid (He's a Loser)") is a song from Static-X's debut album, Wisconsin Death Trip. It was released as a single in February 2000. The song starts off with singer Wayne Static screaming out the words of the chorus, "He’s a loser, she said" and quickly moving on to the main guitar riff that is repeated throughout the song. The outro, a sample of dialogue from actress Linnea Quigley, comes from the 1988 film Sorority Babes in the Slimeball Bowl-O-Rama.

== Live performances ==
System of a Down bassist Shavo Odadjian performed rhythm guitar for the song during a performance at Ozzfest 1999.

== Music video ==
The music video for the song was directed by Dave Meyers. The video shows the band performing on stage in the Orpheum Theatre, while a woman holding a shovel chases down the strange creature from the "Push It" music video. A couple of monsters and a blue man make appearances. In the end, the shovel lady beats the creature down with her shovel, and reveals herself to actually be Wayne Static. There are seven monkeys hidden in the music video.

== Track listing ==
No.	Title	Length
1.	"I'm with Stupid (He's a Loser)" (Edit)	2:48
2.	"I'm with Stupid (He's a Loser)" (Edit with Intro)	2:56

== Charts ==
Chart (2000)	Peak position
US Mainstream Rock (Billboard)	38
