= Project Regeneration Vol. 2 =

Project: Regeneration Vol. 2

Studio album by Static-X
- Released: January 26, 2024
- Recorded: 2003–2005, 2013–2014, 2019–2023
- Genres: Industrial metal; nu metal
- Length: 41:20
- Label: Otsego Entertainment Group
- Producers: Xer0; Edsel Dope (executive); Ulrich Wild (engineering, mix and mastering)

Static-X chronology
Project: Regeneration Vol. 1 (2020)	Project: Regeneration Vol. 2 (2024)

Singles from Project: Regeneration Vol. 2
- 1. "Terrible Lie" Released: February 8, 2023; 2. "Stay Alive" Released: September 7, 2023; 3. "Zombie" Released: October 5, 2023

Project: Regeneration Vol. 2 is the eighth studio album by American industrial metal band Static-X. It features 14 tracks, with some of the final material written and recorded by the late vocalist Wayne Static. It was slated to release on November 3, 2023, but was eventually announced to be pushed back to January 26, 2024, nearly ten years after Static's death.

The album was announced with the first single "Terrible Lie", a cover of the Nine Inch Nails song from Pretty Hate Machine, on February 8, 2023. The second single, "Stay Alive", was released on September 7.

== Background and recording ==
The album features vocal recordings and synthesizer programming by the late frontman Wayne Static that were discovered after he died in November 2014 after an accidental drug and alcohol overdose. The material was so voluminous that it was eventually decided to be split up into two albums, with the first album releasing in 2020.

Producer Edsel Dope has stated about Vol. 2 that it was "more challenging" to put together, as the song fragments they had that were more cohesive and more developed ended up on Vol. 1.

== Critical reception ==
Professional ratings
Review scores
Source	Rating
AllMusic	3.5/5 stars
Blabbermouth.net	8/10
Metal Injection	8/10
Metal Hammer	3/5 stars

Like the first volume, the album garnered positive reviews: Dom Lawson of Blabbermouth.net gave the album 8/10, saying it "is satisfyingly heavy, aggressive and dark, but it's also celebratory, slightly unhinged and vastly more entertaining than anyone could have anticipated". David Pope for Metal Injection wrote, "Project Regeneration Vol. 2 reminded me why I fell in love with this band to begin with." Stephen Hill writing for Metal Hammer said that the album is "perfectly serviceable, and often very enjoyable" and "this line-up continues to prove its worth", but admitted to having "minor quibbles" and that the album "start[s] to drag a bit".

== Track listing ==
All music is composed by Static-X.

Project: Regeneration Vol. 2 track listing
No.	Title	Lyrics	Length
1.	"Stay Alive"	Wayne Static	3:46
2.	"Z0mbie"	Xer0	3:11
3.	"Jic-Boi"	Xer0, Static	2:58
4.	"Black Star"	Static	4:00
5.	"Kamikaze"	Xer0	2:59
6.	"No Hope"	Static	3:17
7.	"Take Control"	Xer0, Tony Campos	3:55
8.	"Tone"	Static	3:15
9.	"Run for Your Life"	Xer0	2:48
10.	"Dark Place"	Static, Xer0	3:19
11.	"Disco Otsego"	Xer0	3:57
12.	"From Heaven" (cover of "The Disease" by Echo and the Bunnymen)		3:55
Total length:			41:20

Bonus tracks
No.	Title	Lyrics	Length
13.	"Terrible Lie" (Nine Inch Nails cover)	Trent Reznor	4:03
14.	"Grover-Yoda-Data 14"	Static, Xer0	2:38
Total length:			48:01

== Personnel ==
- Wayne Static – lead vocals, programming (1, 3–4, 6, 8, 10, 12–14)
- Tony Campos – bass, backing vocals, lead vocals (7, 10)
- Koichi Fukuda – lead guitar, programming
- Ken Jay – drums
- Xer0 – rhythm guitar, programming, lead vocals (2–3, 5, 7, 9–11, 14)

=== Additional personnel ===
- Ulrich Wild – production, engineering, mixing, mastering
- Edsel Dope – executive production, engineering
- Tommy Shaffner – additional programming (1 to 6, 8, 10, 13, 14), additional music (5)
- Nikk Dibbs – additional programming (2, 7, 9, 11), additional music (6), additional vocals (9)
- Sinister – additional vocals (9)

== Charts ==
Chart performance for Project: Regeneration Vol. 2
Chart (2024)	Peak position
UK Album Downloads (Official Charts)	26
UK Independent Albums (Official Charts)	29
UK Rock & Metal Albums (Official Charts)	10
