= Push It (Static-X song) =

Single by Static-X

from the album Wisconsin Death Trip
- Released: 1999
- Genre: Nu metal; industrial metal
- Length: 2:34
- Label: Warner Bros.
- Songwriters: Tony Campos; Wayne Wells
- Producers: Ulrich Wild; Static-X

Static-X singles chronology
"Push It" (1999)	"I'm with Stupid" (2000)

Music video
- "Push It" on YouTube

"Push It" is a song by American industrial metal band Static-X, released in 1999 as the first single from their debut album Wisconsin Death Trip. As one of the band's most popular songs, it's credited, along with "I'm with Stupid", for making Wisconsin Death Trip the best-selling Static-X album.

== Music video ==
The music video for "Push It" was directed by Mick Olszewski and introduces shots of clay animation creatures similar to those found in Tool music videos, interspersed with the band performing.

== Critical reception ==
Men's Health ranked the song at number 44 on their "The 125 Best Heavy Metal Workout Songs of All Time" list, stating its "swift kick in the ass" was birthed from "late-90s industrial metal." Consequence placed it even higher, at number 18, on their "50 Best Industrial Songs of All Time" list, noting its "groovy, heavy, wild industrial sound" served as a "blueprint for Static-X’s music to follow," while Annie Zaleski of Spin ranked the "synth-bisected" song at number 16 on her The 30 Best Nu-Metal Songs" list. She praised its combination of a "rumbling" instrumental with Wayne Static's "banshee screams" and "doomy huffing."

"Push It" is Paolo Gregoletto's, the bassist of heavy metal band Trivium, seventh favorite nu metal song. He summarized the song as "tight metal guitar riffs over a driving 4/4 beat."

== Track listing ==
1. "Push It" - 2:35
2. "Bled for Days (Live)" - 4:09
3. "Push It (JB's Death Trance Mix)" - 3:32
4. "Down (Previously Unreleased)" - 3:14
5. "Push It (Mephisto Odyssey Crucified Dub Mix)" - 6:10

== Charts ==
Chart (1999–2000)	Peak position
US Alternative Airplay (Billboard)	36
US Hot Dance Singles Sales (Billboard)	5
US Mainstream Rock Airplay (Billboard)	20

== Certifications ==
Region	Certification	Certified units/sales
United States (RIAA)	Gold	500,000^{‡}
^{‡} Sales+streaming figures based on certification alone.
