= Cult of Static =

Studio album by Static-X
- Released: March 17, 2009
- Recorded: 2007–2008
- Studio: Kingsize Soundlabs Studios (Los Angeles, California) Static Sound Studios (Burbank, California)
- Genres: Industrial metal; nu metal
- Length: 42:11
- Label: Reprise
- Producers: Wayne Static; John Travis

Static-X chronology
Cannibal Killers Live (2008)	Cult of Static (2009)	Project: Regeneration Vol. 1 (2020)

Singles from Cult of Static
- 1. "Stingwray" Released: February 17, 2009

Cult of Static is the sixth studio album by American industrial metal band Static-X. It was released on March 17, 2009 via Reprise Records. The album's first single "Stingwray" was released and made available on the band's MySpace page on February 17, 2009. The album's title is a reference to the die-hard fans who have supported the band for so long. This would be Static-X's last studio album for eleven years, as well as the last to feature drummer Nick Oshiro and founding member and vocalist Wayne Static during his lifetime, though the latter's posthumously released work was included on the band's Project Regeneration albums. Cult of Static also marked the last time Static-X worked with John Travis, and was the band's last album on Reprise Records.

== Album information ==
Though "Lunatic" was the first single for the album, the song had been released on the Marvel's Punisher: War Zone soundtrack. The song was based partially on a warrior, similar to the Punisher character, and was re-recorded for the album to feature a guitar solo by Megadeth leader Dave Mustaine. The album was produced by John Travis, who also produced Static-X's previous album Cannibal.

Cult of Static continued the band's use of guitar solos and the songs feature more samples and electronic sounds than the previous album, Cannibal. "Stingwray" is available on iTunes and on Static-X's Myspace.

The band's logo on the cover artwork is the same one from Wisconsin Death Trip.

== Reception ==
Professional ratings
Review scores
Source	Rating
About.com	4/5 stars
AllMusic	2.5/5 stars
Alternative Press	3/5 stars
Collector's Guide to Heavy Metal	3/10
Consequence of Sound	1.5/5 stars
IGN	7/10
Revolver	3.5/5 stars
Rock Sound	7/10
USA Today	1.5/4 stars

The album debuted at #16 on the Billboard Top 200 chart and sold 19,000 copies in the United States in its first week, making it the band's highest charting album since 2001's Machine and the album received generally mixed reviews from music critics.

== Track listing ==
All songs written by Wayne Static, except where noted.

No.	Title	Writer(s)	Length
1.	"Lunatic"	Tony Campos, Static	3:35
2.	"Z28"	Campos, Static	3:09
3.	"Terminal"		3:38
4.	"Hypure"		4:15
5.	"Tera-Fied"		5:19
6.	"Stingwray"	Campos, Static	4:10
7.	"You Am I"		3:00
8.	"Isolaytore"		2:46
9.	"Nocturnally"		3:49
10.	"Skinned"		3:34
11.	"Grind 2 Halt"		4:56
Total length:			42:11

iTunes bonus track
No.	Title	Writer(s)	Length
12.	"Still of the Night" (Whitesnake cover)	David Coverdale, John Sykes	5:04
Total length:			47:15

Special edition bonus tracks
No.	Title	Writer(s)	Length
12.	"W.F.O."		3:09
13.	"Looks That Kill" (Mötley Crüe cover)	Nikki Sixx	4:11
Total length:			49:31

Special edition download
No.	Title	Writer(s)	Length
1.	"Talk Dirty to Me" (Poison cover)	Bret Michaels, Rikki Rockett, Bobby Dall, C.C. DeVille	3:48
Total length:			3:48

Expanded edition bonus tracks
No.	Title	Writer(s)	Length
12.	"Stingwray" (Edit)	Campos, Static	3:54
13.	"W.F.O."		3:09
14.	"Looks That Kill" (Mötley Crüe cover)	Nikki Sixx	4:11
15.	"Talk Dirty to Me" (Poison cover)	Bret Michaels, Rikki Rockett, Bobby Dall, C.C. DeVille	3:48
16.	"Still of the Night" (Whitesnake cover)	David Coverdale, John Sykes	5:03
Total length:			1:02:13

== Personnel ==
- Static-X
  - Wayne Static – lead vocals, rhythm guitar, programming
  - Tony Campos – bass, backing vocals, lead vocals on "Talk Dirty to Me"
  - Koichi Fukuda – lead guitar
  - Nick Oshiro – drums

Additional musicians

- Dave Mustaine – first guitar solo on "Lunatic"
- Marc Jameson – additional keyboards

Production

- Wayne Static – production
- John Travis – production, engineering, mixing
- Tom Baker – mastering
- Aaron Paul – assistant engineering
- Nelly Recchia – paintings, photography
- Paul Brown – design

== Chart positions ==
Chart performance for Cult of Static
Chart (2009)	Peak position
Australian Albums Chart	33
US Billboard 200	16
US Hard Rock Albums	2
US Rock Albums	4
US Tastemakers Albums	9
