= Project Regeneration Vol. 1 =

Project: Regeneration Vol. 1

Studio album by Static-X
- Released: July 10, 2020
- Recorded: 2004–2005, 2013–2014, 2019–2020
- Genres: Industrial metal; nu metal
- Length: 39:17
- Label: Otsego Entertainment Group
- Producer: Ulrich Wild

Static-X chronology
Cult of Static (2009)	Project: Regeneration Vol. 1 (2020)	Project: Regeneration Vol. 2 (2024)

Singles from Project: Regeneration Vol. 1
- 1. "Hollow (Project Regeneration)" Released: February 6, 2020; 2. "All These Years" Released: May 15, 2020

Project: Regeneration Vol. 1 is the seventh studio album by American industrial metal band Static-X. It was released on July 10, 2020, by Otsego Entertainment Group and distributed by The Orchard Music, a subsidiary of Sony Music. It is the band's first studio album in eleven years following Cult of Static (2009), their longest gap between studio albums to date, and their first album not on Warner Bros. or Reprise Records. The album includes part of the last recordings of deceased frontman Wayne Static, who died in 2014, with his role being filled by a new frontman credited as "Xer0". Project Regeneration sees the return of the original Static-X lineup—bassist Tony Campos, guitarist and programmer/keyboardist Koichi Fukuda and drummer Ken Jay—and was produced by Ulrich Wild, who has produced and/or mixed all but two albums by the band in the past.

== Background and development ==
Static-X frontman Wayne Static died in November 2014 after an accidental drug and alcohol overdose. At the time of his death, he and the founding members of the band were estranged. Before his death, Static was working on demos that he sent to a producer, who was a mutual friend of Static and Tony Campos; when he rediscovered the recordings after Static's death, he contacted Campos and sent the material to him, but Campos felt it was "too soon", and did not revisit the recordings until 2016 when Tripp Eisen contacted him with the idea to reunite and begin writing music for a Static-X reunion and album. Eisen made Campos aware of the three fully completed, mixed and mastered extra songs from the Start a War album. Campos additionally found material on DA-88s while he was looking for live backing tracks for the then upcoming tour; because of the recording technique of the DA-88, vocals and instruments were recorded simultaneously on two different tapes, but some tapes were lost or too damaged to be recovered. Some tapes also included guitars and programming; one of them, entitled "Turn It On", was eventually reworked into "Terminator Oscillator". In a 2024 interview, producer Edsel Dope described the arduous process of recovering audio from the damaged tapes as "more work than anybody will probably ever know", estimating that recovering a three-minute vocal take would need on average 50 edits in 2- to 3-second chunks, because the tape would glitch out so frequently.

Although the band originally intended to recruit guest vocalists to contribute to Static's compositions, the band announced in June 2019, "We unexpectedly uncovered even more unreleased tracks left behind by Wayne... many of these had isolated vocal performances!" Consequently, the band took more time to complete the record, which "will now have fewer guest vocalists and more complete songs featuring lead vocals by Wayne Static", with the exception of Ministry's Al Jourgensen. The album also includes new compositions without Static's involvement, such as "Otsego Placebo", which was originally intended for Vol. 2., but come mix time, it was "closer to the finish line than many of the other songs".

=== Tripp Eisen contribution dispute ===
The band’s former lead guitarist Tripp Eisen received co-writing credits for three songs, under his legal name “T Salvador”. The band said they used older material written by Eisen, and he had no involvement in studio recording sessions. He was fired from the band in 2005 after being arrested twice on charges of sex with underage girls, and was eventually convicted on all charges.

He claimed to have co-written twelve of the album’s songs, and also claimed his former band members were trying to avoid paying him royalties. Eisen also stated a "legal dispute" was the reason for the album's delay.

== Release and marketing ==
On October 23, 2018, the bassist Tony Campos, lead guitarist Koichi Fukuda and drummer Ken Jay announced that they were reforming to tour for the 20th anniversary of Wisconsin Death Trip and would release Project Regeneration, featuring compositions and vocals recorded before Static's death in 2014. Along with the announcement, the band shared a trailer for the album featuring clips from an upcoming music video and snippets of five previously unreleased songs. The band made several bundles of the album available for pre-order, with fans who pre-ordered the album able to have their name featured in the liner notes. Matt Zane was recruited to direct several music videos for songs from the album.

On February 6, 2020, the band released the album's first single, "Hollow (Project Regeneration)", their first single in 10 years. According to Tony Campos, "Hollow (Project Regeneration)" dates back to the recording sessions of Start a War, but was not released on the album or any album after due to the music not being fully realized. The band later replaced the instrumental tracks underneath the vocals under the advice from the producers to avoid resembling the original demo material. The band also announced that they were expanding the album to two volumes because of the number of recordings they had found.

On May 15, 2020, the band released the album's second and final single, "All These Years", with an accompanying music video. The band also announced that the album's standard release on streaming and CD had been pushed back to July 10, 2020, with the vinyl edition pushed back to August 14, due to manufacturing delays associated with the COVID-19 pandemic. Tony Campos, speaking to Loudwire, said, "The album is 100% complete. We are just waiting for the manufacturing to resume. We have been given word that all is finally in production, so we are excited to get this out to the fans."

== Critical reception ==
Professional ratings
Aggregate scores
Source	Rating
Metacritic	84/100
Review scores
Source	Rating
AllMusic	4/5 stars
Blabbermouth.net	8/10
Consequence of Sound	B+
DriveTribe	4/5 stars
Sonic Perspectives	8.5/10
Sputnikmusic	3.7/5

Project Regeneration Vol. 1 was met with critical acclaim from music critics. At Metacritic (a review aggregator site which assigns a normalized rating out of 100 from music critics), based on 4 critics, the album has received a score of 84/100, which indicates "universal acclaim". Sputnikmusic called it a "labour of love" and DriveTribe called it "a brilliant mix of the fast industrialism that made Wisconsin Death Trip so awesome and the more alt-metal stylings of Shadow Zone and Start a War". Reviewers also noted the late Static's presence on the record, writing that "despite the breakup and the very founder's death Static-X is still a Wayne Static project through-and-through", and "although a fair amount of the music was re-written or heavily re-worked by the surviving band members, Wayne's sheer talent still clearly shines through".

Concluding the review for AllMusic, Neil Z. Yeung claimed that "Respectfully done, Project: Regeneration Vol. 1 is a fun and technically proficient reminder that Static-X were ahead of their time and perhaps a little underrated. Through this cathartic process, the album serves as a love letter to Static and their loyal fan base, a respectful tribute that both honors his legacy and adds an unexpected new chapter to their discography."

== Track listing ==
Project: Regeneration Vol. 1 track listing
No.	Title	Music	Length
1.	"Regeneration"	Xer0, Koichi Fukuda, Tom Shaffner	1:00
2.	"Hollow (Project Regeneration)"	Tony Campos, Xer0, Ken Jay, Fukuda, T Salvador, (Note: Better known as Tripp Eisen) Wayne Static	2:41
3.	"Worth Dyin For"	Campos, Xer0, Jay, Fukuda, Static	3:26
4.	"Terminator Oscillator"	Campos, Xer0, Jay, Fukuda, Static	3:13
5.	"All These Years"	Campos, Xer0, Jay, Fukuda, Nikk Dibs, Static	3:56
6.	"Accelerate"	Campos, Xer0, Jay, Fukuda, Dibs	2:48
7.	"Bring You Down (Project Regeneration)"	Campos, Xer0, Jay, Fukuda, Salvador, Static	3:35
8.	"My Destruction"	Campos, Xer0, Jay, Fukuda	3:29
9.	"Something of My Own (Project Regeneration)"	Campos, Xer0, Jay, Fukuda, Salvador, Static	2:52
10.	"Otsego Placebo"	Campos, Xer0, Jay, Fukuda, Shaffner	4:20
11.	"Follow"	Campos, Xer0, Jay, Fukuda, Static	3:08
12.	"Dead Souls" (featuring Al Jourgensen)	Campos, Xer0, Jay, Fukuda, Static	4:44
Total length:			39:17

== Personnel ==
- Wayne Static – programming, lead vocals (2, 3, 5, 7, 9, 11, 12)
- Tony Campos – bass, backing vocals, lead vocals (4, 10)
- Koichi Fukuda – lead guitar, programming
- Ken Jay – drums
- Xer0 – rhythm guitar, programming, lead vocals (3, 4, 6, 8, 10, 11)

=== Additional personnel ===
- Al Jourgensen – additional vocals (12)
- Nikk Dibbs – additional programming (5, 6, 11, 12), additional music (5, 6)
- T Salvador – additional music (2, 7, 9), additional lyrics (7, 9)
- Tom Shaffner – additional programming (1, 10)
- Ulrich Wild – production, engineering, mixing, mastering
- Edsel Dope – executive production, engineering

== Charts ==
Chart performance for Project: Regeneration Vol. 1
Chart (2020)	Peak position
Scottish Albums (Official Charts)	95
US Billboard 200	48
