= Bled for Days =

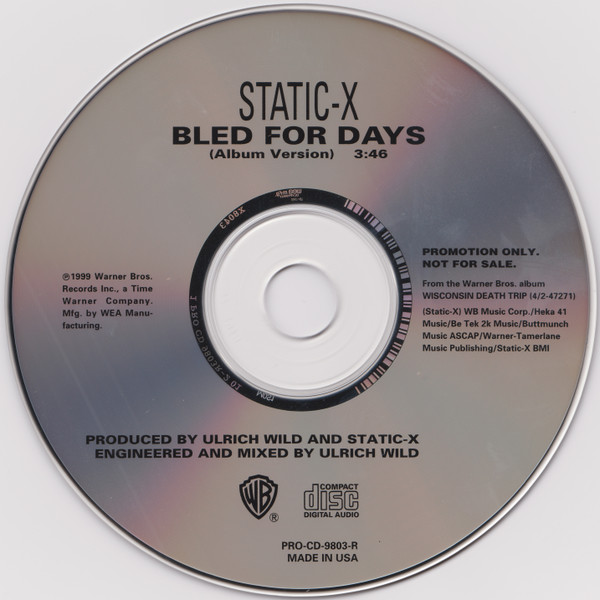
- Promotional CD Single

Single by Static-X

from the album Wisconsin Death Trip
- Released: April 5, 2000
- Genre: Industrial metal; nu metal
- Length: 3:45
- Label: Warner Bros.
- Songwriters: Tony Campos; Koichi Fukuda; Kenneth Lacey; Wayne Wells

Static-X singles chronology
"I'm with Stupid" (2000)	"Bled for Days" (2000)	"Black and White" (2001)

"Bled for Days" is the third single from the American industrial metal band Static-X's debut album, Wisconsin Death Trip. It has appeared on several soundtracks, including the Universal Soldier: The Return and Bride of Chucky soundtracks. The music video for "Bled for Days" was recorded at a Static-X live show and mixed with the album version of the song. When Nick Oshiro auditioned for the band, the first song they played was "Bled for Days" and after they were done they knew they were going to recruit him.

== Chart performance ==
Chart (1999)	Peak position
US Billboard Mainstream Rock Tracks	36
