= Brent Ashley =

American bassist

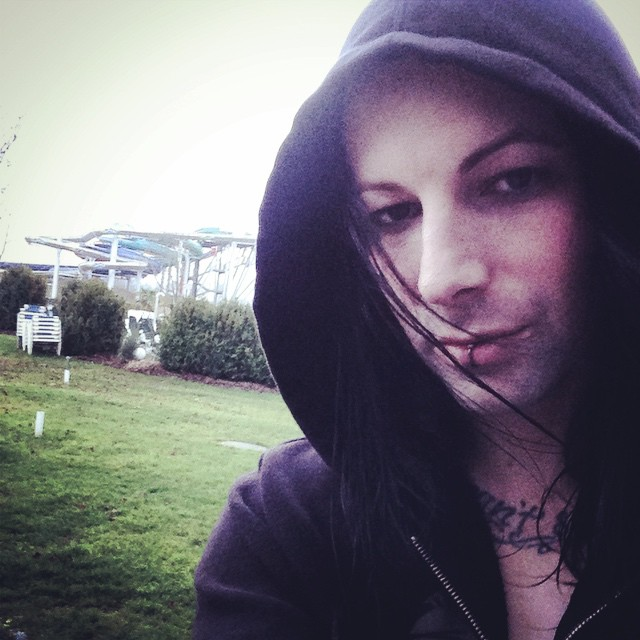
Brent Ashley

Brent Ashley is an American musician who was the former bassist for industrial metal band Combichrist and former bassist for the Natural Born Killers featuring Max Green of Escape the Fate. He is also a former member of Static-X and was also a part of Wayne Static's solo project band in support of his album Pighammer. Other past bands include The Dreaming, Orgy, Skold, Lacey Conner, September Mourning, Leisure, Davey Suicide, Psyclon Nine and Synical. Ashley and Green started a band called Violent New Breed. Their first album was out in 2016.
