= Punisher: War Zone (soundtrack) =

Punisher: War Zone – Original Motion Picture Soundtrack

Soundtrack album by Various artists
- Released: November 25, 2008
- Genres: Heavy metal, thrash metal, metalcore, industrial rock, hardcore punk, electronic rock, post-hardcore, alternative metal, nu metal
- Length: 55:41
- Label: Lionsgate

Professional ratings
Review scores
Source	Rating
Allmusic	2.5/5 stars
CHARTattack	3/5 stars

Punisher: War Zone – Original Motion Picture Soundtrack is the soundtrack for the film Punisher: War Zone, the album was released on November 25, 2008. The soundtrack includes the original track "War Zone", written for and inspired by the film, by musician Rob Zombie. An online contest was held by Lionsgate, and led to 7 Days Away (a band local to Connersville, IN) taking first place with the track "Take Me Away".

== Track listing ==
No.	Title	Writer(s)	Artist	Length
1.	"War Zone"	Rob Zombie^{[a]}^{[b]}; John Five^{[b]}	Rob Zombie	3:52
2.	"Final Six"	Tomás Araya; Jeff Hanneman; Kerry King; Dave Lombardo	Slayer	4:09
3.	"Psychosocial"	Slipknot	Slipknot	4:44
4.	"Historia Calamitatum"	Joseph Principe; Timothy McIlrath; Brandon Barnes; Zach Blair	Rise Against	3:23
5.	"Fallen"	Shaun Morgan; Dale Stewart; John Humpphrey	Seether	4:17
6.	"Bulletproof"	Kerli Kõiv; Thomas Who	Kerli	5:02
7.	"Take Me Away"	Jay Bales; Skylar Nichols; Zack Jackson; Blake Snoddy; Trey Sturgeon	7 Days Away	3:20
8.	"The Past Is Proof"	Senses Fail; James "Buddy" Nielsen^{[a]}	Senses Fail	3:36
9.	"Butterfly Wings"	Scott Benzel; Michael Fisher; Stuart Kupers	Machines of Loving Grace	3:39
10.	"Genesis"	Gaspard Augé; Xavier de Rosnay	Justice	3:56
11.	"Showdown"	Robert Swire Thompson	Pendulum	5:27
12.	"Refuse/Resist"	Massimiliano Cavalera; Andreas Kisser; Igor Cavalera; Paulo Pinto Jr.	Sepultura	3:10
13.	"Lunatic"	Wayne Static; Tony Campos	Static-X	3:36
14.	"Days of Revenge"	Rob Lind	Ramallah	3:30
Total length:				55:41

Notes

- ^{^[a]} signifies a lyricist
- ^{^[b]} signifies a composer

== Reception ==
The soundtrack reached the number 23 slot on Billboard's Top Independent Albums chart.
