= Static-X =

American industrial metal band

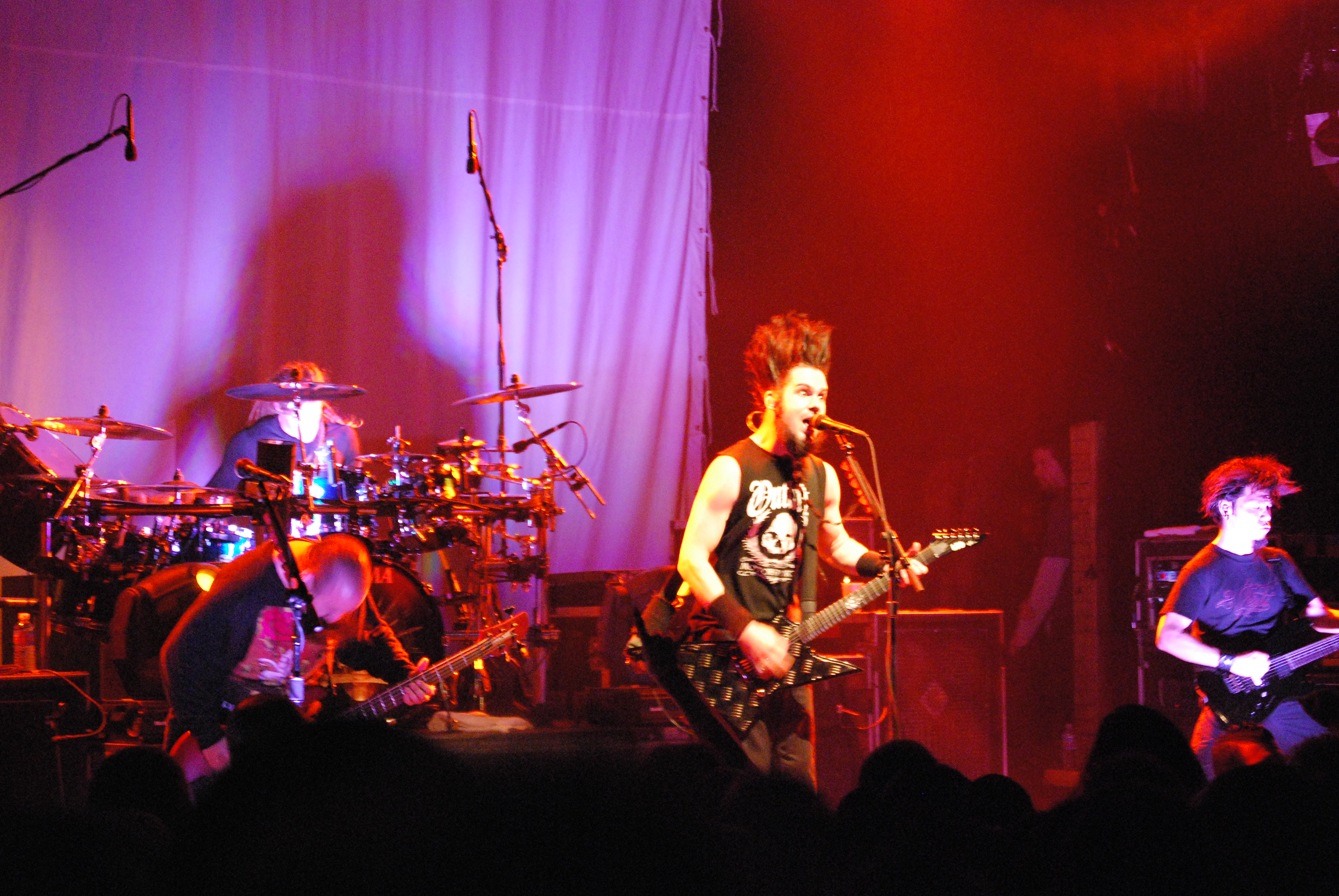
- Static-X performing in Hollywood during the 2007 Cannibal Killers tour. Members from left to right: Tony Campos, Nick Oshiro, Wayne Static, Koichi Fukuda.

Background information
- Also known as: Battery (1994), Drill (1994–1995), Static (1995–1998)
- Origin: Los Angeles, California, U.S.
- Genres: Industrial metal; nu metal; alternative metal
- Years active: 1994–2010; 2012–2013; 2018–present
- Labels: Warner Bros.; Reprise; Otsego Entertainment Group
- Members: Tony Campos; Koichi Fukuda; Ken Jay; Xer0
- Past members: Wayne Static; Emerson Swinford; Tripp Eisen; Nick Oshiro; Brent Ashley; Andy the Kid; Diego Ibarra; Sean Davidson
- Website: www.static-x.org

Static-X is an American industrial metal band from Los Angeles, California, formed in 1994. The lineup has fluctuated over the years, but was long held constant with band founder, frontman, vocalist and rhythm guitarist Wayne Static until his death in 2014.

The band was founded by Static and original drummer Ken Jay. They rose to fame with their 1999 debut album Wisconsin Death Trip where their heavy industrial metal sound attracted attention within the burgeoning nu metal movement of the late 1990s, with the album eventually going platinum in the United States. The band released five more albums over the course of the next decade: Machine in 2001, Shadow Zone in 2003, Start a War in 2005, Cannibal in 2007, and Cult of Static in 2009. By 2011, the band had sold over three million albums worldwide.

The band entered a hiatus while Static worked on his solo album, Pighammer, in 2011. Static briefly reformed Static-X in 2012, using only members of his solo album's touring band, before officially breaking up in June 2013. On November 1, 2014, Wayne Static died at the age of 48.

The rest of the original Static-X lineup – bassist Tony Campos, lead guitarist Koichi Fukuda and drummer Ken Jay – announced on October 23, 2018, that they were reforming the band in Static's honor, and would release Project: Regeneration Vol. 1, their first studio album in eleven years, in 2020. A follow-up album, Project: Regeneration Vol. 2, was released on January 26, 2024.

== History ==
=== Formation, Wisconsin Death Trip and Machine (1994–2001) ===
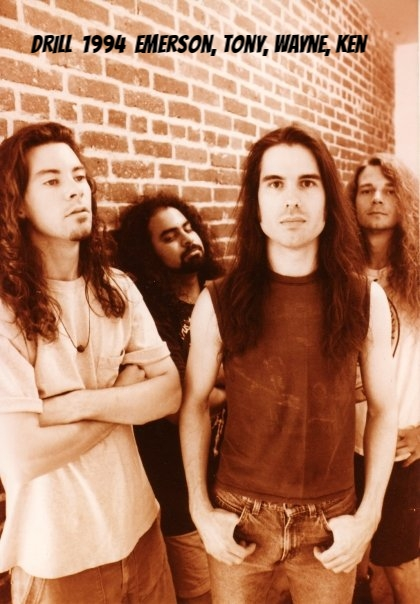
Drill in 1994

Static-X was founded in 1994 after the disbandment of Wayne Static's prior band, Deep Blue Dream. Static played in the band in the late 1980s with future Smashing Pumpkins frontman Billy Corgan. However, when the Smashing Pumpkins began to gain popularity, Corgan made the choice to commit all of his attention to the Smashing Pumpkins, and Deep Blue Dream eventually disbanded. Static and Ken Jay later moved to Los Angeles to start a new band with guitarist Emerson Swinford, whom they had met through their mutual friend, Chicago singer-songwriter, PJ Olsson. They formed a band called Battery and released a demo tape as a trio. Tony Campos then joined the band on bass, and thus they changed their name to Drill. Another demo tape was released around the same time. After Swinford left to pursue touring and session work, they recruited guitarist Koichi Fukuda, and renamed the band Static; however, during the recording of their debut album, they realized there were multiple other bands named Static, and subsequently renamed the band to Static-X.

Static-X signed with Warner Bros. Records in early 1998, and released their debut album, Wisconsin Death Trip, on March 23, 1999. Soon after, they released their first single "Push It", followed by "I'm with Stupid" and "Bled for Days" in 2000. Static-X toured strictly in support of the album and twice performed on Ozzfest, supporting Fear Factory. In the following year, a promotional EP, The Death Trip Continues, was also released.

The band toured heavily in support of the album, with Static recounting:

"It was really just a whirlwind and I barely remember it. We worked so hard and toured so hard that I don't even remember most of it. We played 300 shows in the first year and we just never went home. We would tour on one tour for six or eight weeks and that tour would end somewhere on the East Coast and we'd drive a couple days and hook up with Slayer and tour with them for four or five weeks. That tour ends and then we'd drive a few days to Boston to hook up with Sevendust. We just kept going and kept going and never went home. I mean I didn't even have a home. I lived at the rehearsal space for the last year before we started touring. I had to quit my job to make the record so I didn't have anywhere to even go home to...I look back at it now and I kinda wish I had taken the time to sit back and appreciate it more. Maybe got to know some of the other bands a little more and spend time and having a good time and partying and maybe taking some pictures of the other guys."

Commercially, the effort paid off, with the album eventually going platinum in 2001. The follow-up tour was documented on the DVD Where the Hell Are We and What Day Is It... This Is Static-X. However, the pressure of recording a follow-up was hard on Static and the rest of the band. Static, worried they would be unable to deliver another successful album, desired to start work on follow up material while still touring in support of Wisconsin Death Trip, while the rest of the band wanted to focus on enjoying the touring. Without support, Static took matters into his own hands, writing all of the material himself over the course of the two years of touring. This caused friction from within the band, who resented Static for not waiting for them or including them in on the creation process, of which all members had been part of in the prior album. Fukuda left the band upon the conclusion of the tour, leading the band to record the album as a three-piece; Static later described the split both as "amicable" and "definitely not [...] amicable". Despite this, the band still managed to find success, with the second album, Machine, releasing on May 22, 2001, and eventually being certified gold with 500,000 units sold. Tripp Eisen replaced Fukuda on guitar for touring in support of the album.

=== Shadow Zone and Start a War (2003–2005) ===
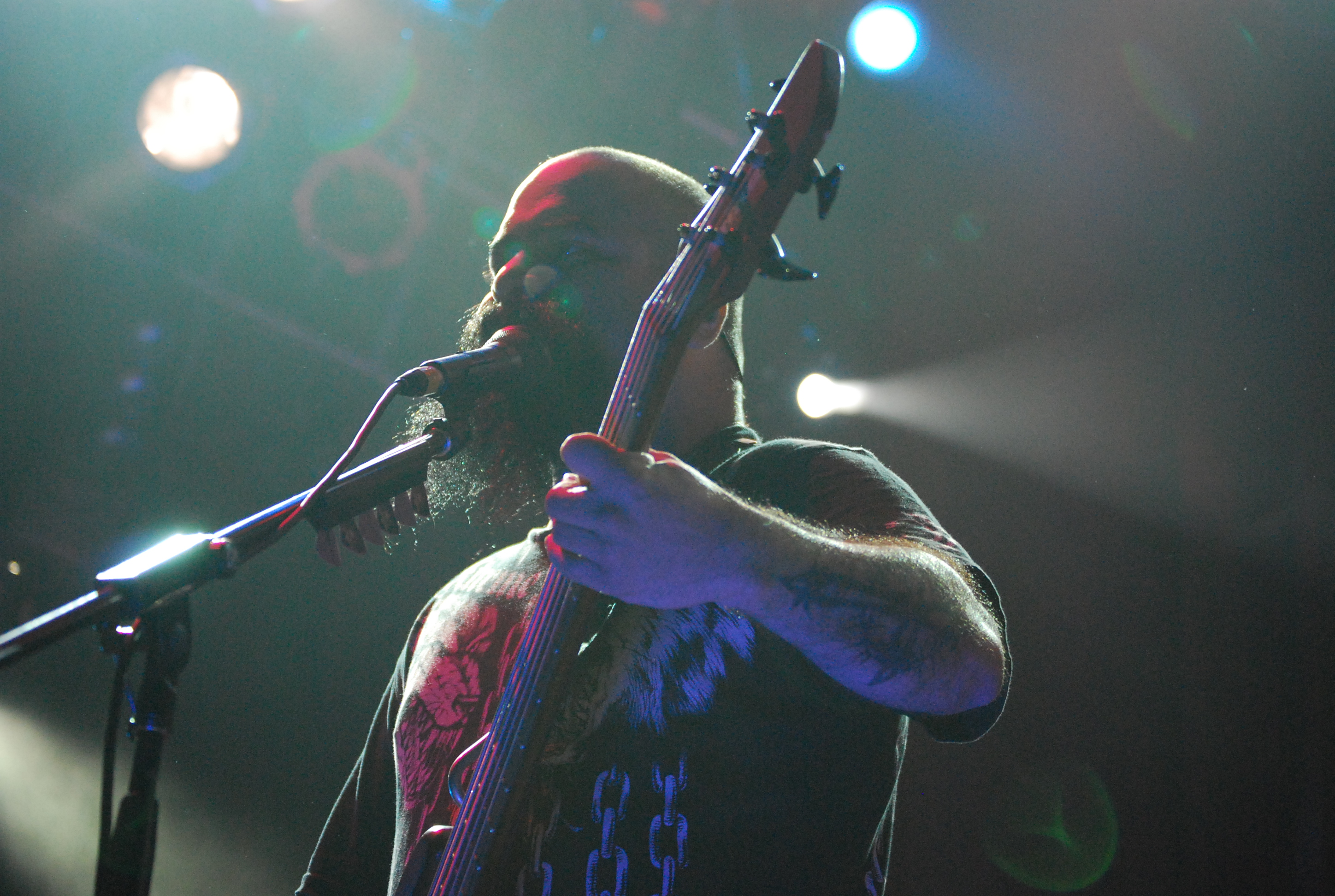
Tony Campos

In 2002, Static was contacted by Jonathan Davis of the nu metal band Korn. Davis had recently signed on to provide the soundtrack for the Queen of the Damned film soundtrack, but due to contract limitations with Sony, was legally unable to actually perform the music he had written for the soundtrack. As a remedy of this, Davis contacted a number of metal vocalists, Static included, to sing on the songs he had written. Static provided vocals for one track, "Not Meant for Me", with the Queen of the Damned soundtrack releasing in February 2002.

The contribution was a turning point for the band; the track, which was much more melodic than much of the band's music up until that point, attracted the attention of Warner Brother's executive Tom Whalley, who pressured the band as a whole to pursue a melodic sound. Personnel and lineup changes further altered the band's sound. The label would not allow the band to work again with record producer Ulrich Wild as they had for their prior two albums, instead arranging for them to work with Josh Abraham, a producer known for working with more commercially melodically mainstream bands such as Staind, Filter, and Velvet Revolver. The album was the first to feature Eisen's songwriting contributions and performances, and the only to feature sessions drummer Josh Freese, of A Perfect Circle, due to Jay leaving the band two days before beginning the formal recording process. Jay has been reluctant to talk about his reasons for leaving.

The band's third album, Shadow Zone, was released on October 7, 2003, and debuted at no. 20 on the Billboard 200 charts, but failed to achieve the platinum or gold selling status of their prior two albums. Two singles were released to promote the album, "The Only" and "So". The band proceeded to hire Nick Oshiro, formerly of Seether, as Jay's replacement and the band's permanent drummer, to tour in support of the album.

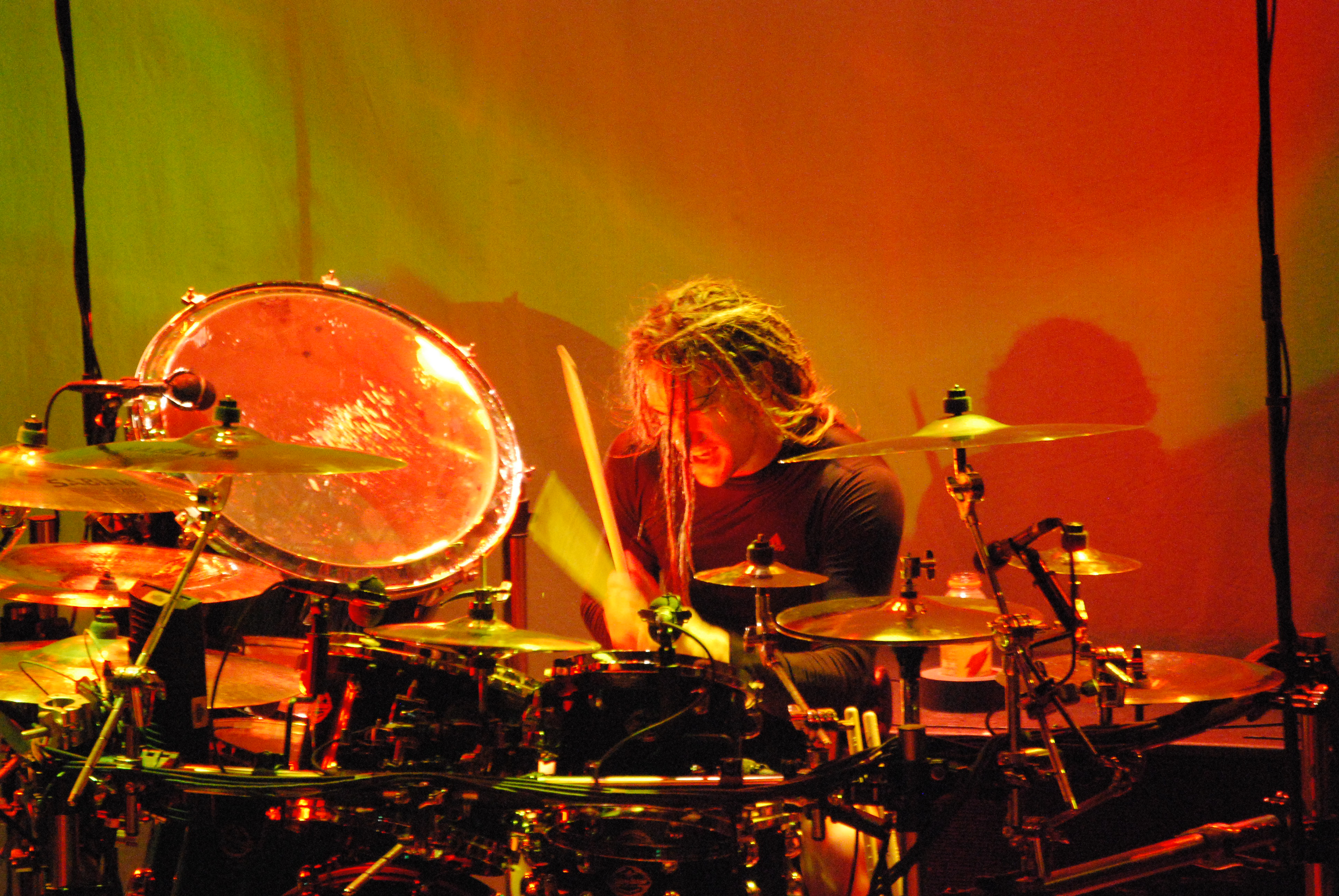
Nick Oshiro

July 20, 2004 saw the release of Beneath... Between... Beyond..., a collection of rarities and demos. Shortly after the release of Beneath... Between... Beyond..., the band toured again with Fear Factory, and commenced work on their fourth studio album, Start a War. In February 2005, Tripp Eisen was arrested in a sex scandal involving minors, and was subsequently fired from the band. Former guitarist Koichi Fukuda, who had been providing samples and keyboards for the new album, rejoined Static-X to fill the gap left by Eisen. Start a War was finally released on June 14, 2005. "I'm the One" and "Dirthouse" were released as singles from the album.

=== Cannibal and Cult of Static (2007–2009) ===
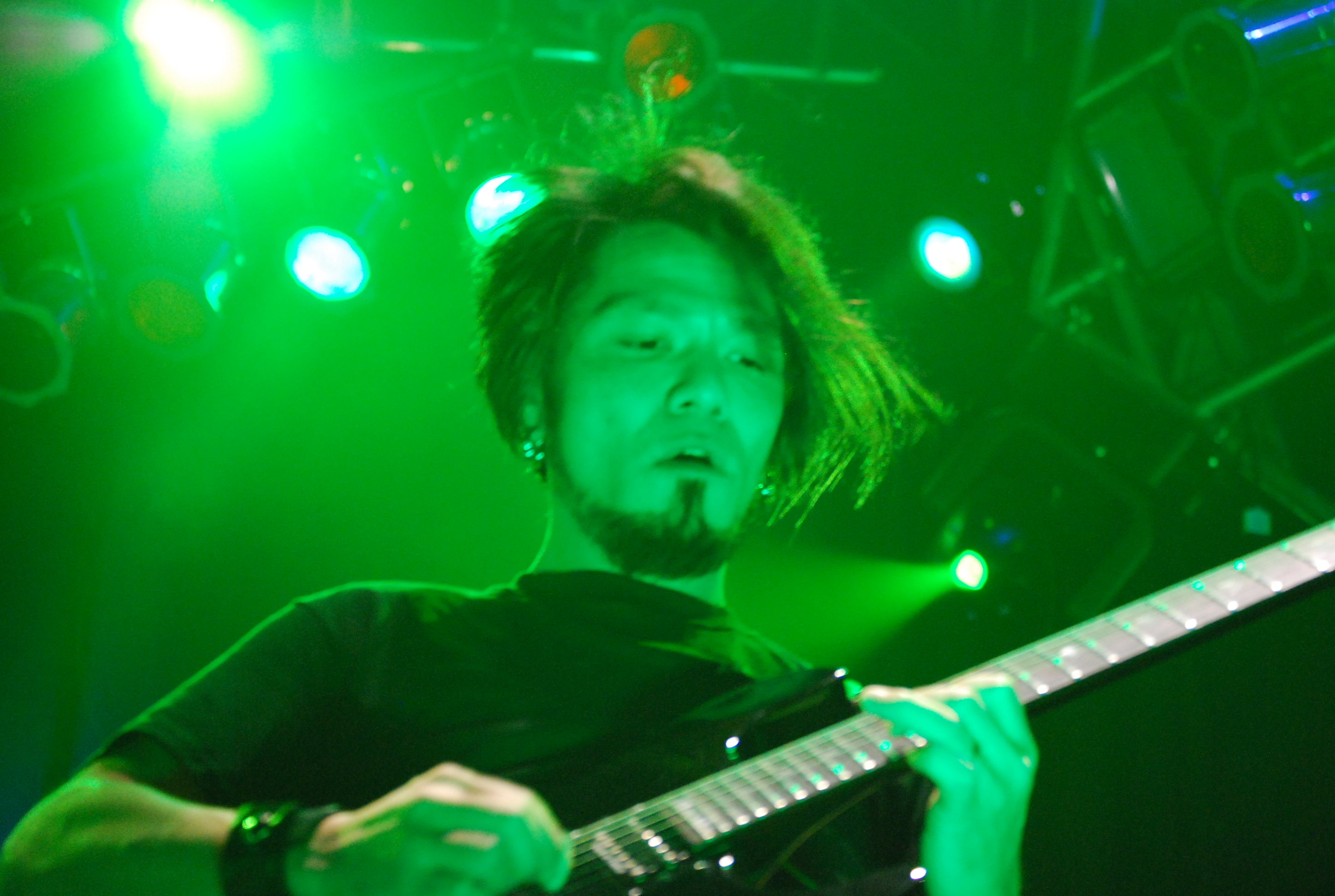
Koichi Fukuda

Their fifth album, Cannibal, released on April 3, 2007, marked the studio return of their original guitarist, Koichi Fukuda. One of the new tracks called "No Submission" was released on the Saw III soundtrack prior to the album's release. "Cannibal" was released as a digital download single at iTunes. "Destroyer" was released as a lead off radio single, before the album was released.

On March 20, the album was preceded with an exclusive Destroyer EP, with a video being produced for the title track. The album itself debuted at No. 36 in the U.S. with sales of over 30,000.

On May 10, 2007, it was announced that the band would be playing on the main stage at Ozzfest 2007. Additionally, at the time, Static first announced his intention to release solo material, referring to it as "Pighammer". In the meantime, in November 2007, Campos temporarily joined Ministry as a touring bassist for Ministry's C U LaTour in the wake of Paul Raven's death.

The band began working on their sixth studio album, Cult of Static, in January 2008 after returning from the Operation Annihilation tour in Australia. Static stated they intended to mix the longer buildups and break downs from Wisconsin Death Trip with the heaviness that was present on Cannibal. On October 14, 2008, Static-X released their live CD/DVD, Cannibal Killers Live. On December 11, 2008, Static revealed the album's release date and name saying "I had hoped to announce it here first, but my publicist beat me to the punch! The new record is indeed entitled Cult of Static and will be released March 17. The "cult" part of the title is not to be taken in any religious manner, I am referring to and giving respect to the loyalty of all you good people that have supported us through the years. This record is definitely darker than Cannibal and has more synths and loops as well. And this is also the most crushing guitar tone I have ever had. There are 11 songs instead of our usual 12, and they are mostly longer and more epic than ever before." The album debut at No. 16 on the Billboard 200 chart, the highest since their second studio album, Machine. A new Static-X song called "Lunatic" appeared on soundtrack to the movie Marvel's Punisher: War Zone. Drummer Nick Oshiro left Static-X prior to the start of the tour, being replaced by touring drummer Will Hunt. The tour in support of the album lasted for the rest of the year, playing major concerts such as the Download Festival and Rock on the Range.

=== Hiatus, breakup and Wayne Static's death (2010–2017) ===
After finishing their final tour dates in Australia at the end of 2009, the band began to cave to Static's friction with the rest of the band: Fukuda wanted to focus more on his new family, and Oshiro's newfound sobriety was clashing with Static's substance abuse; Campos later called this stage of the band a "toxic environment". Static announced that he would be focusing on his side project, then tentatively titled Pighammer. He later revealed that Campos had left the band, and eventually joined the metal band Soulfly. but clarified that the band had not broken up, but rather, members were just doing different projects at the time; Campos maintains he never left the band. Static began his solo touring in 2011, most notably playing at Graspop Metal Meeting 2011. He released his debut solo album Pighammer on October 4, 2011.

In 2012, Wayne Static decided to reform Static-X, but none of the original members joined him. Instead his solo band toured under the name Static-X. In June 2013, Static announced Static-X's official break-up. Static blamed it on a disagreement with Campos over the rights of the band; citing that Campos was paid by Wayne for the use of the name while touring, but during that tour, Wayne took ill; in a 2019 post, former tour manager Eric Dinkelmann claimed, however, that the illness was just an official cover and the real reason for the tour cancellation was "a drug bust", which Campos later also alluded to. Static ended the band soon afterwards. Despite breaking up the band, Static still performed the band's music under his own name and solo band in 2014, most notably playing the Wisconsin Death Trip album in its entirety to celebrate the album's fifteenth anniversary. In a 2022 interview, Edsel Dope, who was on the same tour bill as Static at the time, recalled that the tour experience revealed to him the depths of Static's drug addiction, and that while he made an effort to convince Static to reform the full band, he was "not sure without rehab it will be possible".

On November 1, 2014, Wayne Static died at the age of 48. Static's wife, Tera Wray, released a statement stating that despite Static's prior history of drug use, he had stopped his drug use in 2009, and that his death was not drug or overdose related. Despite her claims, the coroner's report, released in March 2015, indicated that his death was the result of a combination of excessive prescription drugs and alcohol in his system, though the manner of death was deemed "natural." Wray herself died of suicide in 2016.

=== Reunion and Project: Regeneration (2018–present) ===
On October 23, 2018, original members Tony Campos, Koichi Fukuda and Ken Jay revealed plans for Static-X to reunite and to release a new album in 2019 called Project Regeneration, which would include previously unreleased tracks with Wayne Static's vocals and guest vocals by David Draiman, Ivan Moody, Dez Fafara, Burton C. Bell, Al Jourgensen, Edsel Dope and others.

The band also embarked on a worldwide tour in 2019 to celebrate the 20th anniversary of their debut album Wisconsin Death Trip as well as a memorial to Wayne Static, featuring an unidentified vocalist named "Xer0" wearing a mask some confused to be that of Wayne Static. This decision received mixed feedback, with some journalists calling it a "creepy Wayne Static cosplay" and "zombie Wayne Static". The band insisted that Static's family gave the band their blessing, and Jay noted that it fit Static's "terrifically morbid sense of humour". While Xer0's identity has never been officially revealed, speculation has generally pointed at Dope singer Edsel Dope. Edsel himself denied this initially, but later admitted to his role, saying that he and the band felt Xer0 should be a separate entity from Dope. The mask was made by the late Laney Chantal, wife of Twiggy Ramirez.

On February 6, 2020, the band released the first new song from their forthcoming and renamed album Project: Regeneration Vol. 1 titled "Hollow (Project Regeneration)". It was then announced that Project Regeneration would now consist of two volumes, both with at least 10 songs, all of them with vocals by Wayne Static. The album was slated to be released May 15, 2020, but was eventually pushed to be released on July 10, 2020, due to the manufacturing delays associated with the COVID-19 pandemic. The band resumed work on Volume 2 shortly after the release of the first volume.

On August 22, 2021, Campos stated that the band was working on Project: Regeneration Vol. 2, which also consists of recovered material, as well as entirely new songs. On February 8, 2023, the band announced the album would be released later in the year on November 3. The lead single for Project: Regeneration Vol. 2 was a cover of Nine Inch Nails' "Terrible Lie". The band went on tour that winter with Fear Factory, Dope, Mushroomhead, Twiztid supporting on select dates. On June 12, the Machine Killer Tour was announced with Static-X co-headlining with Sevendust. The album's release was eventually pushed back to January 26, 2024, nearly ten years after Static's death. Edsel Dope has cited the songs "Black Star" and "Stay Alive" as the reasons for the delay, both of which were built from material discovered in the last minute. Regarding the next Static-X album, Campos stated that it was up to the fans if the band could continue making music without Wayne Static. In March 2024, a documentary about the band, Evil Disco: The Rise, Fall, and Regeneration of Static-X, was announced.

In early 2026, a dispute between Mikael Johnston, of the electronic act Mephisto Odyssey, and Dope. over the anniversary release of "Crash: Reborn", a modernized version of Mephisto Odyssey's 2000 collaboration track "Crash" which featured vocals from Wayne Static. Johnston accused Dope and the current band of aggressively attempting to block the release of the track and its music video, which utilized restored archival 35mm footage of Wayne Static. According to Johnston, label representatives from Rhino Entertainment and legal counsel indicated that the objections stemmed directly from Static-X management, nearly shelving the project despite a year of restoration work. Members of the band, including guitarist Acey Slade, downplayed the accusations by noting that releasing competing Wayne Static-related material simultaneously was counterproductive to both parties. Despite the underlying friction, the track was legally cleared through Warner Bros. and proceeded to release, quickly amassing over one million views on streaming platforms.

The band performed at Welcome to Rockville in May 2026, but on May 18, 2026, they announced the cancellation of all remaining tour dates for the rest of the year, due to undisclosed "serious medical issues". In a follow-up statement, they clarified that the health matters required immediate attention but reassured fans they would return to touring in 2027.

== Musical style and influences ==
Static-X has been categorized as industrial metal, nu metal, alternative metal, industrial and groove metal. Self-described as "evil disco", Static-X's style, according to The Washington Post, "combines electronic elements influenced by industrial artists such as Ministry and Skinny Puppy with the harshness of bands like Pantera". Static-X's style also has used elements of genres such as techno, speed metal, and thrash metal. Late vocalist Wayne Static explained that early in the band's career, they jokingly coined the term "evil disco" to self-describe their music: "It has dance elements and the grooves, but yet it's dark and eerie. [...] I am kind of holding the torch for that. It surprisingly has inspired a lot of other bands through the years which is a real fucking joke." He opined that the band was labeled as nu metal by the music press simply "because it was happening at the same time."

Static has cited house music as an influence on Static-X's music. Static also has said that throughout 1994 to 1996, he listened to the Prodigy and the Crystal Method. Static has said that he "imagined Static-X was gonna be like a Prodigy or a Crystal Method and more of an electronic-based thing". Static-X's influences include the Crystal Method, The Prodigy, Prong, Pantera, Ministry, Korn, the Sisters of Mercy, the Chemical Brothers, Joy Division, Kiss, Mortician, Fear Factory and Crowbar. Despite being labeled in the nu metal category, Campos noted that the band never felt the genre applies to them, explaining that they were more about blending industrial and electronic aspects of music into a heavy metal sound, and that they were influenced more by the music of Ministry, Prong, and the Spawn soundtrack.

A recurring mention in the band's material was the mention of "Otsego", a reference to Otsego, Michigan, with songs named after the town including "Otsegolation", "Otsego Undead", "Otsegolectric", "Otsego Amigo", "Disco Otsego" and "Otsego Placebo"; Wayne Static attended Western Michigan University and at the time used a fake ID that claimed he was "Dean from Otsego".

== Band members ==
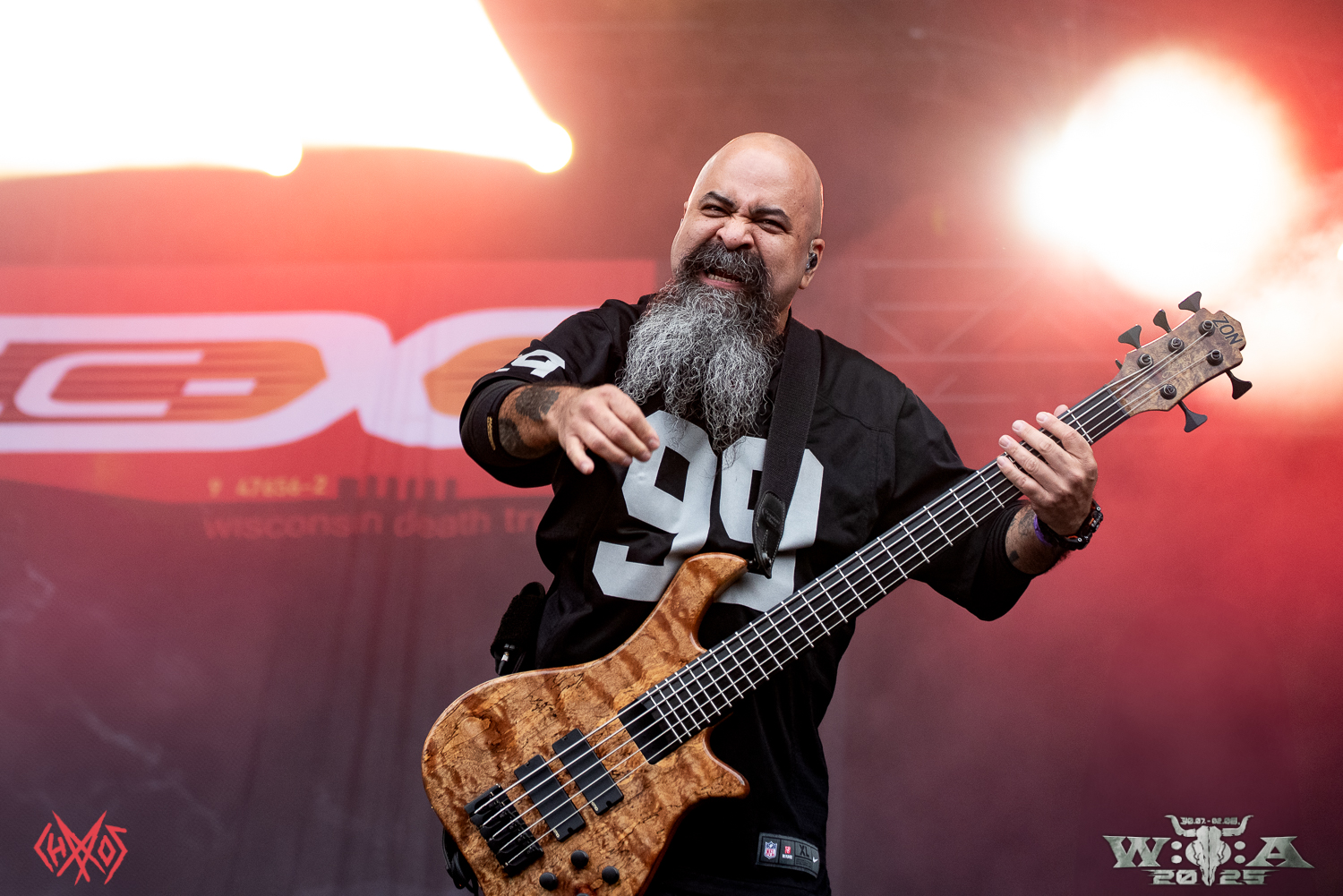
Tony Campos

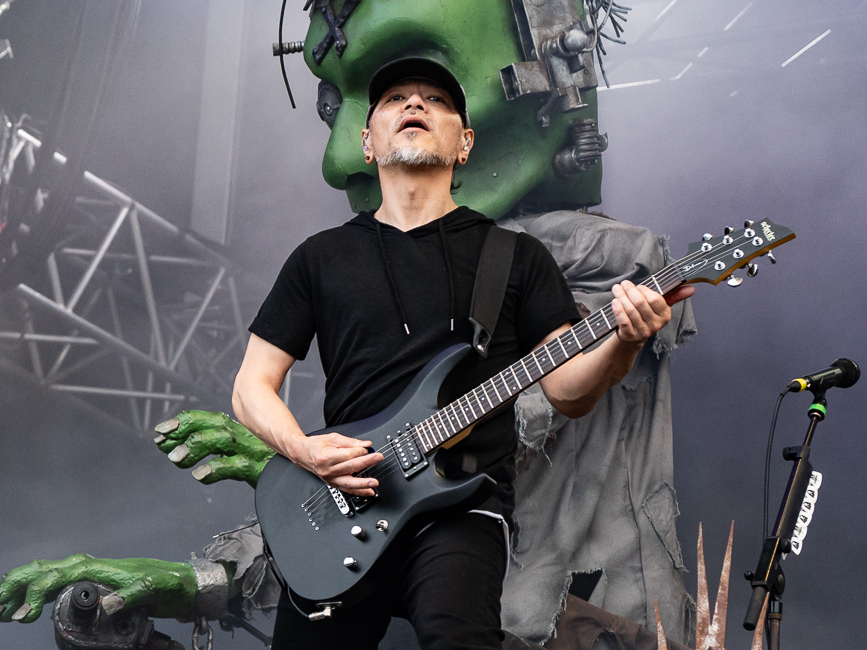
Koichi Fukuda

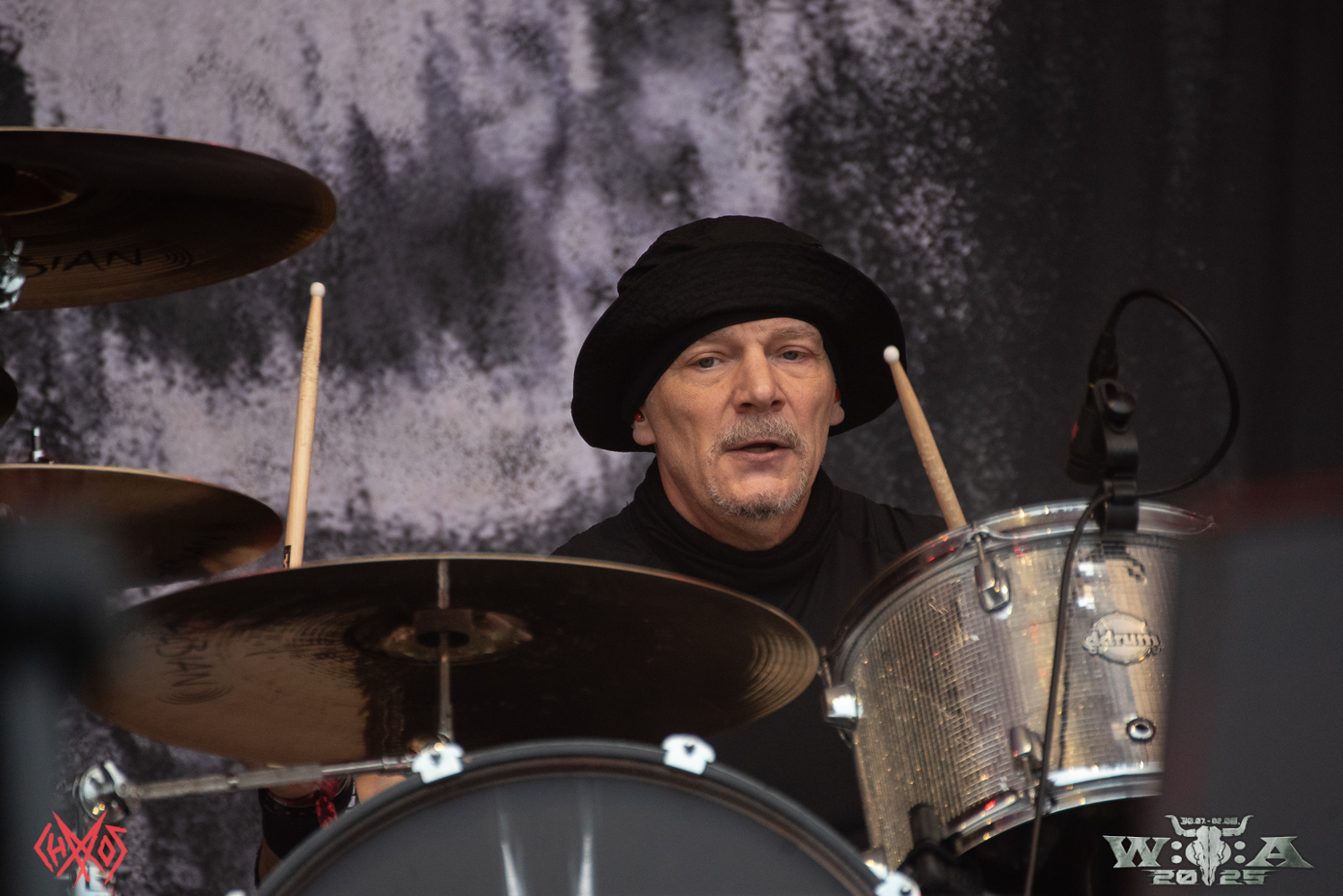
Ken Jay

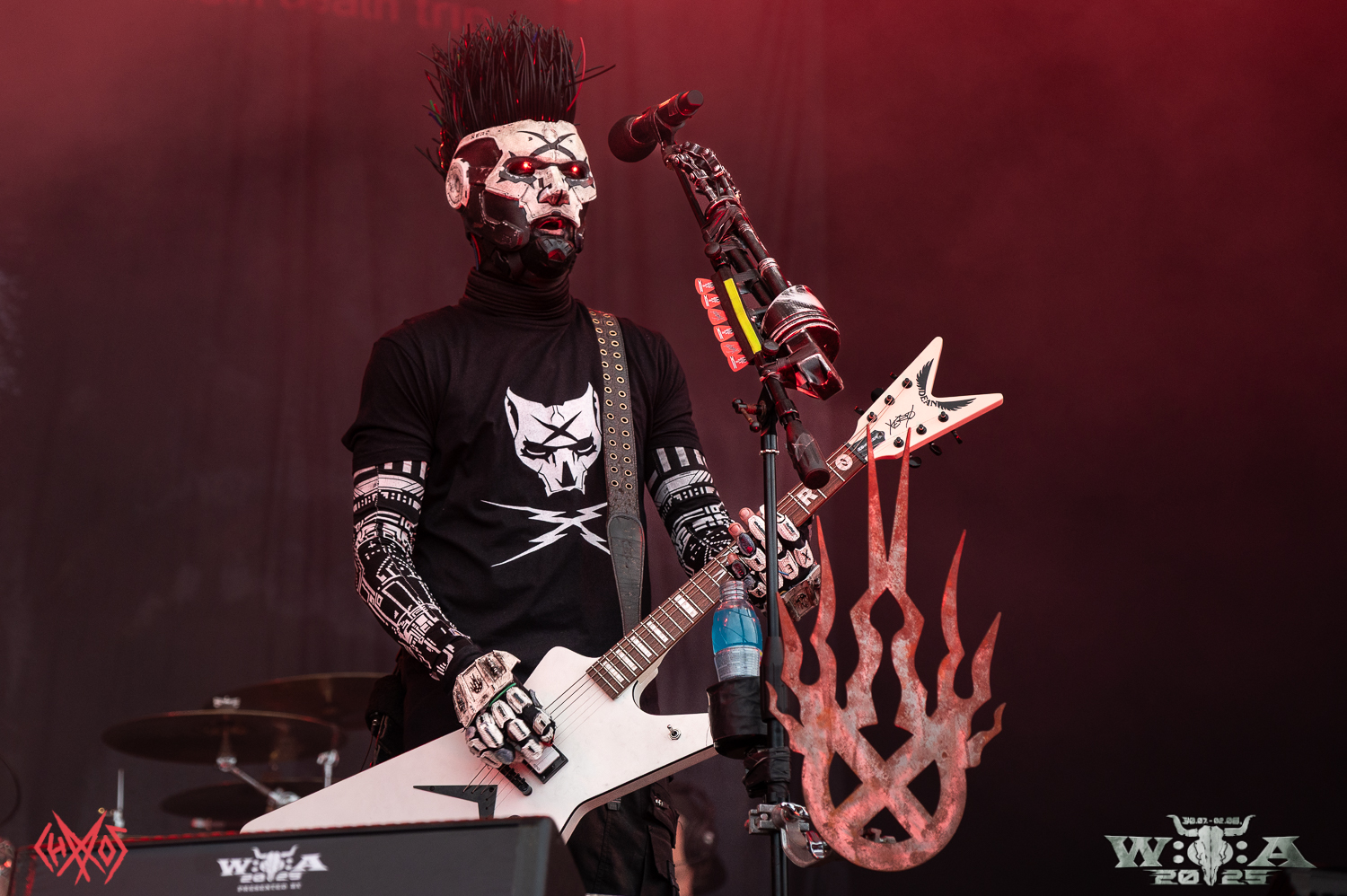
Xer0
Current members
- Tony Campos – bass, backing vocals (1994–2010, 2018–present)
- Koichi Fukuda – lead guitar, keyboards, programming (1994–2000, 2005–2010, 2018–present)
- Ken Jay – drums (1994–2003, 2018–present)
- Xer0 – lead vocals, rhythm guitar, programming (2018–present)

Former members

- Wayne Static – lead vocals, rhythm guitar, keyboards, programming (1994–2010, 2012–2013; died 2014)
- Emerson Swinford – lead guitar (1994)
- Tripp Eisen – lead guitar (2000–2005)
- Nick Oshiro – drums (2003–2010)
- Diego Ibarra – lead guitar (2012–2013)
- Sean Davidson – drums (2012–2013)
- Brent Ashley – bass, backing vocals (2012)
- Andy the Kid – bass, backing vocals (2012–2013)

Touring members

- Marty O'Brien – bass (2001)
- Will Hunt – drums (2009–2010)
- Bevan Davies – drums (2010)

Timeline

== Discography ==
Studio albums

- Wisconsin Death Trip (1999)
- Machine (2001)
- Shadow Zone (2003)
- Start a War (2005)
- Cannibal (2007)
- Cult of Static (2009)
- Project: Regeneration Vol. 1 (2020)
- Project: Regeneration Vol. 2 (2024)
