= Andy the Kid =

Australian musician

- Origin: Townsville, Australia
- Genres: Industrial, hard rock
- Years active: 2008–present
- Website: andythekid.com

Andrew Cole (born 30 May 1984), better known by his stage name Andy the Kid, is an Australian musician.

== Biography ==
Cole was raised in Townsville, Australia. He played bass guitar in several Townsville bands before he moved to Los Angeles, United States, in early 2008 to pursue a career in music. He joined Orange County outfit Neo Geo on bass in 2008, embarking on two Vans Warped Tour's with the band in 2010 and 2011 and recorded an album with the band before leaving the group in 2012. After leaving, Cole went on tour with Static-X in 2012. When Static-X broke up, he was asked by founding member and lead vocalist Wayne Static to join his solo project, and played bass and backing vocals for Static in 2013 and 2014. One of these tours was supported by industrial metal band Dope, who asked Cole to fill in on bass for a series of live shows across North America.

In 2010, Cole joined Hollywood-based metal band We Are The Riot, with Coal Chamber members Meegs Rascón and Mikey "Bug" Cox. The band is currently recording their debut album with Ulrich Wild in Hollywood, around Meegs and Mikey's tour schedules. The record is due for release in late 2015.

Cole said of his solo effort:

WATR is still my priority and focus, however with the boys doing Coal Chamber, the Andy the Kid record gives me a project that is uniquely mine. I'm taking a DJ approach to the record by writing everything, then pulling in my favorite producers and musicians to perform. It's going to be a real eclectic blend of songs, with more of a rock focus than a metal one.

The lead single from the EP, "Cowboys Evolution (Rise Up)" was released on 27 February 2015, and is being used by the North Queensland Cowboys NRL team as their official theme song for the 2015 rugby league season.

On 5 May 2015, Andy released his debut EP Linchpin as well as his cover of Pendulum's "The Island", Which features Aaron Nordstrom from Gemini Syndrome. Linchpin was produced by Ulrich Wild & Rocco Gaurino.

May 2015 saw Andy the Kid head out on his first headline tour of Australia, which included a half time performance at the North Queensland Cowboys vs Brisbane Broncos match at 1300SMILES stadium, in addition to shows in Townsville, Cairns, Melbourne, Sydney & Melbourne.
