= Tera Wray =

American pornographic film actress (1982–2016)

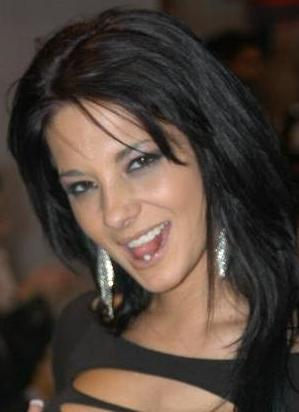
- Wray in 2007
- Born: Tera Elizabeth Lents; April 14, 1982; Owensboro, Kentucky, U.S.
- Died: January 13, 2016 (aged 33); Joshua Tree, California, U.S.
- Cause of death: Suicide
- Other name: Tera Wray Static
- Occupation: Pornographic film actress
- Spouse: Wayne Static (m. 2008; died 2014)

Tera Elizabeth Lents (April 14, 1982 – January 13, 2016), known professionally as Tera Wray, was an American pornographic film actress. In his biography of Wray, performing arts researcher Harris M. Lentz III referred to her as "a star of alternative pornography".

== Early life ==
Tera Elizabeth Lents was born on April 14, 1982, in Owensboro, Kentucky.

== Performing arts career ==
Wray's stage name was derived from her real first name, Tera, and her best friend's middle name, Wray.

In summer 2006, Pleasure Productions signed her as their first contract performer in two years. Her first scene was with Lee Stone in Naughty Auditions, the second of her films to be released. Her first film released was Sweet Smokin' Hotties, on March 8, 2007. Her first lesbian scene was with Nicki Hunter.

Wray was a fan of heavy metal music, and hosted Matt Zane's adult-oriented music series, Radium, during which she interviewed bands and attended concerts, as well as performing in sex scenes. She traveled with Ozzy Osbourne's Ozzfest Summer Tour 2007 as a model for the tour's sponsors, Hustler Lingerie. In 2009, she appeared in the music video for "Stingwray".

== Personal life and death ==
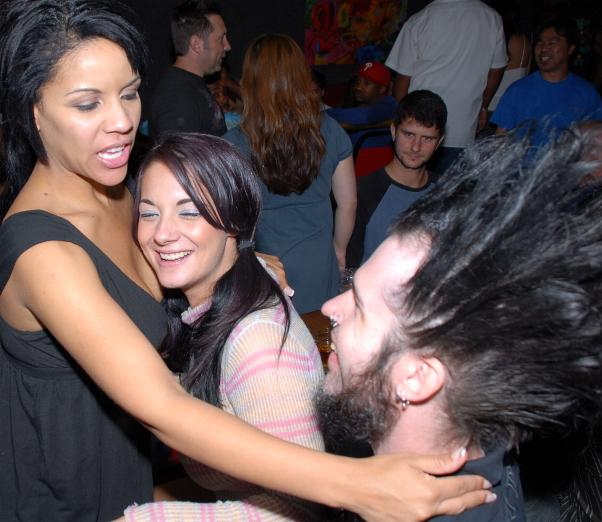
Wray (center) alongside her husband Wayne Static and Elena Heiress (left), 2007

During the 2007 Ozzfest tour, Wray began dating Static-X frontman Wayne Static. On January 10, 2008, the couple wed in Las Vegas. She announced her retirement from the industry in August 2008. Wray reported quitting drugs in 2009. In 2009, Static-X released their sixth studio album, Cult of Static. This album features two tracks relating to Wray: "Tera-Fied", a pun on Wray's stage name, and "Stingwray", a reference to her Corvette Stingray.

Wray was widowed after Wayne Static died on November 1, 2014. She died by suicide at her home in Joshua Tree, California, on January 13, 2016. Wray was 33 years old. Her roommate and friend, Jay'e Jones, discovered Wray's body at their home that evening. A note left by Wray instructed Jones to call Wray's mother, her attorney, and several others. She was cremated.

== Awards ==
- 2008 F.A.M.E. Award Finalist – Favorite Rookie Starlet
- 2008 AVN Award nominee – Best New Starlet
- 2008 AVN Award nominee – Most Outrageous Sex Scene (Tattooed & Tight) with Mark Zane
- 2008 XBIZ Award nominee – New Starlet of the Year
- 2009 AVN Award nominee – Best All-Girl Couples Sex Scene (The Orifice)
- 2009 AVN Award nominee – Most Outrageous Sex Scene (Tattooed & Tight 3)

== Filmography ==
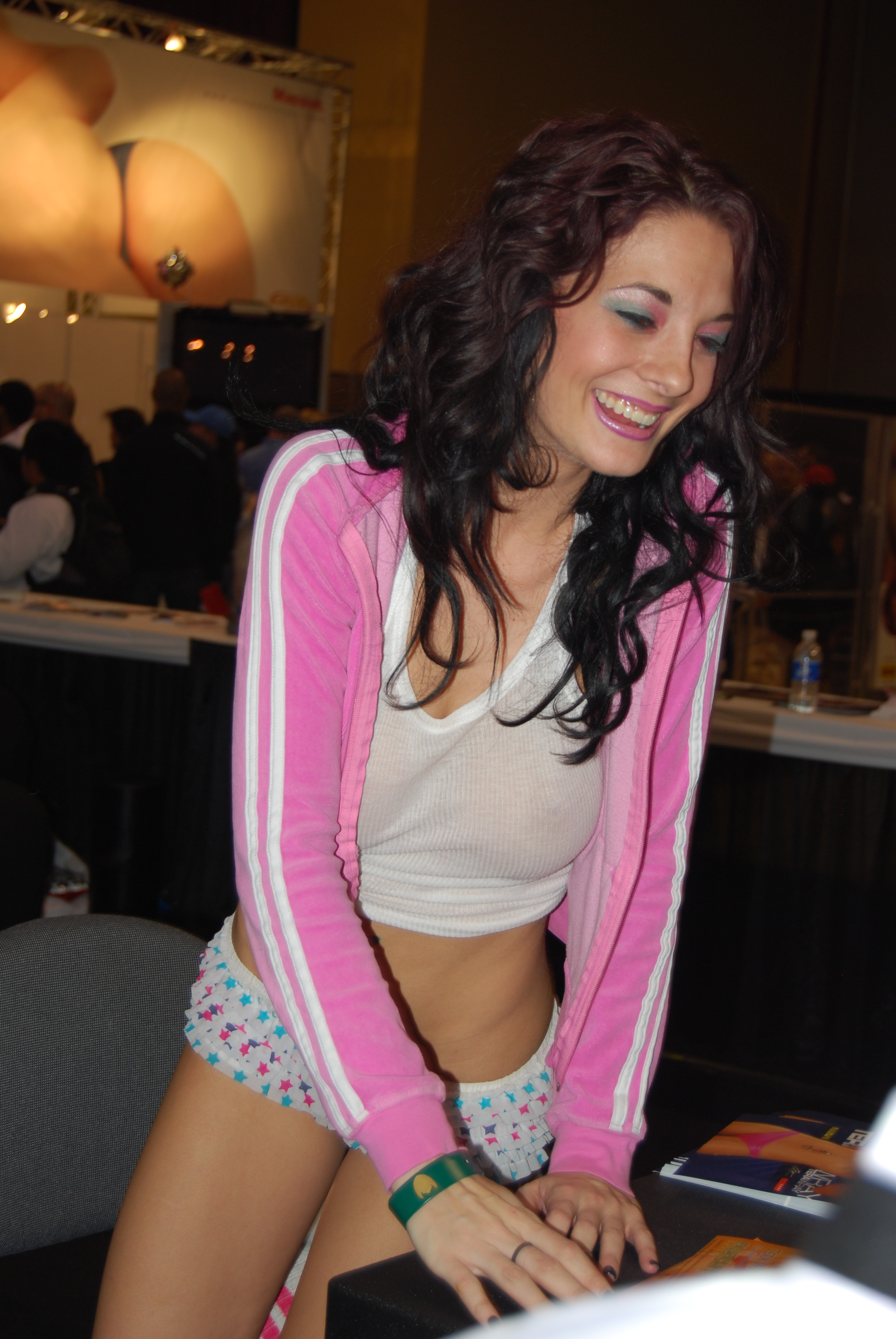
Wray at the AVN Adult Entertainment Expo 2008

- 19 Year Old Cuties POV 2 (2007)
- 19 Year Old Cuties POV 3 (2007)
- Asseaters Unanimous 15 (2007)
- Cone Alone (2007)
- Desperate Housewives Confessions (2007)
- For Once a Whore and Ever a Whore (2007)
- House of Ass 5 (2007)
- Impassioned (2007)
- Maya Hills Is the Runaway Brat (2007)
- Naughty Auditions (2007)
- Punkd Ur Ass 1 (2007)
- Punkd Ur Ass 2 (2007)
- Radium 1 (2007)
- Sweet Smokin' Hotties (2007)
- Tattooed and Tight 1 (2007)
- Tattooed and Tight 2 (2007)
- Tera Wray Is the Runaway Brat (2007)
- All Holes No Poles 1 (2008)
- Orifice (2008)
- Radium 2 (2008)
- Strap-On Sally 23 (2008)
- Tattooed and Tight 3 (2008)
- Stingwray (music video, 2009)
- There Will Be Cum 6 (2009)
- Passionate Pleasures (2011)
- Pussy Smashin (2013)
- Lesbian Slut Fest (2014)
