= Pighammer =

Studio album by Wayne Static
- Released: October 4, 2011
- Genre: Industrial metal; nu metal
- Length: 42:04
- Label: Dirthouse
- Producer: Wayne Static

Singles from Pighammer
- 1. "Assassins of Youth" Released: August 23, 2011

Professional ratings
Review scores
Source	Rating
Blabbermouth.net	6/10
Loudwire	3.5/5 stars
PopMatters	3/10
Revolver	3/5 stars

Pighammer is a studio album by American Alternative Metal musician Wayne Static, released on October 4, 2011, through Dirthouse Records. It is his only album as a solo artist, and the final album released during his lifetime. It debuted at number 97 on the Billboard 200 with first-week sales of 4,700.

== Concept ==
Static explained the album's concept:

"The Pighammer concept conjures up bizarre images. It's about a mad plastic surgeon, with a pig fetish, that likes to convert hot chicks into pigs. It is the total opposite of what a plastic surgeon would do. He has this crazy hammer device made from a pig foot. The images of the surgery in the CD package are only a dark comedic visualization of the real theme of the album, which is my transformation."

Static's "transformation" was in reference to his decision to stop his use of drugs in 2009. Static wrote the album as a tribute to his new drug-free life, in hopes of inspiring others to get clean as well.

== Track listing ==
All tracks are written by Wayne Static.

No.	Title	Length
1.	"Pighammer"	0:28
2.	"Around the Turn"	2:27
3.	"Assassins of Youth"	3:13
4.	"Thunder Invader"	4:47
5.	"Static Killer"	5:06
6.	"She"	3:30
7.	"Get It Together"	3:33
8.	"Chrome Nation"	3:33
9.	"Shifter"	4:03
10.	"Slave"	4:09
11.	"The Creatures Are Everywhere"	4:26
12.	"Behind the Sky"	2:54
Total length:		42:04

== Personnel ==
- Wayne Static – vocals, all instruments, producer
- Tera Wray – additional vocals
- Jack Keener – engineering & mixing
- Nelly Recchia – photography & makeup

== Chart positions ==
Chart (2011)	Peak position
US Billboard 200	97
US Top Hard Rock Albums (Billboard)	7
US Top Independent Albums (Billboard)	16
US Top Rock & Alternative Albums (Billboard)	22
