= Wisconsin Death Trip (album) =

Studio album by Static-X
- Released: March 23, 1999
- Recorded: 1998
- Studios: Grandmaster Studios, Hollywood
- Genres: Industrial metal; nu metal
- Length: 43:55
- Label: Warner Bros.
- Producer: Ulrich Wild

Static-X chronology
Demo 1997 (1997)	Wisconsin Death Trip (1999)	Machine (2001)

Singles from Wisconsin Death Trip
- 1. "Push It" Released: June 10, 1999; 2. "I'm with Stupid" Released: February 11, 2000; 3. "Bled for Days" Released: April 5, 2000; 4. "Love Dump" Released: October 31, 2000

Wisconsin Death Trip is the debut studio album by American industrial metal band Static-X, released on March 23, 1999, by Warner Bros. Records.

The band was formed after lead singer Wayne Static and drummer Ken Jay met at a Virgin Records store in Chicago, and later relocated to California. Tony Campos joined on bass, followed soon after by guitarist Koichi Fukuda. Warner Brothers Records signed them in February 1998.

Wisconsin Death Trip peaked at number 107 on the US Billboard 200 and number one on the Top Heatseekers chart, and was certified platinum by the RIAA in 2001. Four singles were released from the album: "Push It", "I'm with Stupid", "Bled for Days" and "Love Dump".

== Background ==
Wisconsin Death Trip was produced by Ulrich Wild in eight weeks with a budget of $50,000. Static-X originally wanted Terry Date to produce, but could not afford his fee. They hired Wild, who had worked as Date's assistant. The band wanted very "machine-like" sounding drums, but without the use of a drum machine; instead, they built their own triggering system from pieces of plywood and piezo microphones to record the kick, snare and tom drums into Opcode Vision. The cymbals were then recorded separately. Samples were programmed in by Static in an Alesis HR-16, while synth lines were produced by Fukuda with a Roland MC-303.

Wisconsin Death Trip features a song written by vocalist Wayne Static and drummer Ken Jay's former band Deep Blue Dream, titled "December". The crash-landing scene from the 1968 film Planet of the Apes was sampled in the intro of "Sweat of the Bud". The intro for "Stem" was sampled from the 1989 experimental horror film Begotten. A sample of dialogue from actress Linnea Quigley from the 1988 film Sorority Babes in the Slimeball Bowl-O-Rama appears in the outro of "I'm with Stupid".

== Title ==
The album's title was borrowed from Michael Lesy's 1973 book of the same name. Static's sister Lisa had a copy of the book. Originally, the band - at the time called "Static", which management deemed too common to be service marked - wanted to use the title as the band name, but the label deemed it too long.

The book contains a collection of photographs and essays about people who died under extreme or unusual conditions in the region around Black River Falls, Wisconsin in the late 19th century. When interviewed about the source of the title, Wayne Static explained, "[It's] actually a book title that we stole. It's been out of print for about 20 years. It's a historical book about life in this small town in Wisconsin from 1890 to 1900. And it's about everything that happened, but it focuses on people dying and how they died. And there are pictures of dead people as well as stuff about natural disasters and fires and stuff like that."

== Reception ==
Professional ratings
Review scores
Source	Rating
AllMusic	4/5 stars
Christgau's Consumer Guide	(1-star Honorable Mention)
Collector's Guide to Heavy Metal	6/10
The Rolling Stone Album Guide	4/5 stars

CMJ included the album in its "Loud Rock '99 Top 5" list, saying, "Static-X's industrial/metal hybrid uses a guitar sound that keeps its songs refreshingly large, loud and groovable." In 2018, Revolver include the album on their list of "20 Essential Nu-Metal Albums". At AllMusic, Tim Sheridan called it "Fast, cheap, and out of control. This is gutbucket thrash for the most jaded of teenaged parking lot dwellers." Robert Christgau claimed it was "Horrorshow abuse in living stereo--they mean it, man." In 2021, it was named one of the 20 best metal albums of 1999 by Metal Hammer magazine.

== Singles ==
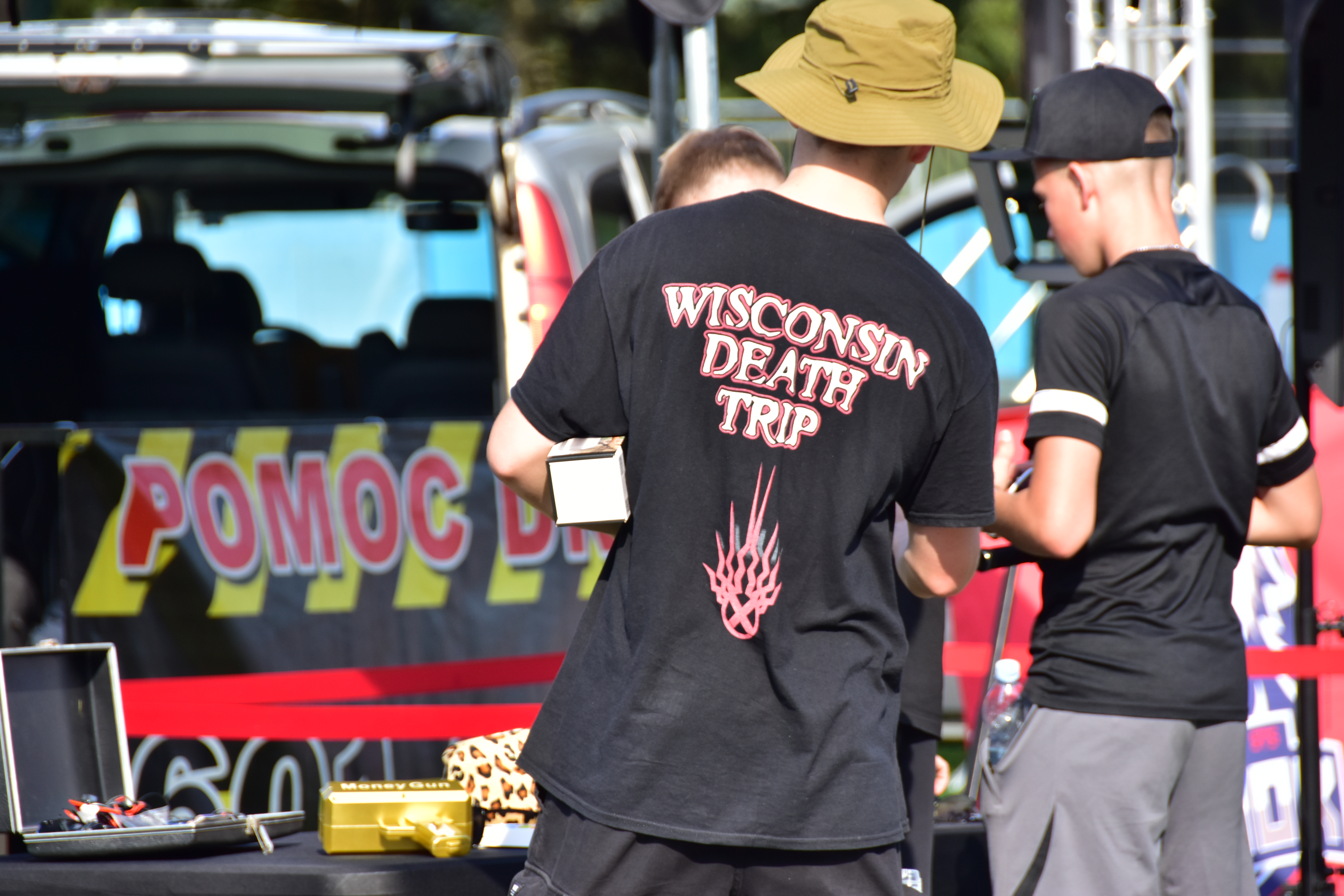
Man wearing t-shirt promoting Wisconsin Death Trip (Poland, 2024)

"Push It" was the first single released from the album. The song features an array of sounds from industrial metal to the band's "evil disco" style. Mick Olszewski directed the music video for the song, using clay figures along with shots of the band.

"I'm with Stupid" was released as the second single from the album. The song kicks off with Wayne Static bellowing out the chorus and then transitions to the lead guitar riff. David Meyers directed the song's music video, featuring creatures from the previous video. The video also includes Wayne Static playing a woman, and monkeys hidden throughout. This song, along with "Push It", is credited with Wisconsin Death Trip's success.

"Bled for Days" was released as the third single from the album; technically, it was the first song released off the album as it originally appeared on the Bride of Chucky soundtrack nearly six months before the release of Wisconsin Death Trip. The music video is composed of recordings from live shows, and the audio was spliced with the original album version.

"Love Dump" was released as the fourth and final single from the album. The song samples the line "I Can't Believe I'm Letting You Do This To Me" from the 1994 vampire film Nadja.

== In popular culture ==
"Push It" was used in the intro for the 2000 video game Duke Nukem: Land of the Babes. The track was also included in the soundtrack for the 1999 film Idle Hands and was featured in the 2004 film Torque. A remix of the song "Love Dump" appeared on the soundtrack to the 2001 film Valentine, as well as the 2009 video game Brütal Legend. In 2008, "Push It" was made available as downloadable content in the music game Rock Band. "Otsegolation" was featured in the soundtrack for the American release of Omega Boost in 1999, and "Bled for Days" was included in the soundtrack for the films Bride of Chucky and Universal Soldier: The Return.

== Track listing ==
All tracks are written by Static-X.

No.	Title	Length
1.	"Push It"	2:34
2.	"I'm with Stupid"	3:24
3.	"Bled for Days"	3:45
4.	"Love Dump"	4:19
5.	"I Am"	2:47
6.	"Otsegolation"	3:32
7.	"Stem"	2:54
8.	"Sweat of the Bud"	3:30
9.	"Fix"	2:49
10.	"Wisconsin Death Trip"	3:09
11.	"The Trance Is the Motion"	4:50
12.	"December"	6:17
Total length:		43:55

Japanese edition bonus track
No.	Title	Length
13.	"Down"	3:15
Total length:		47:10

XXV Anniversary bonus disc
No.	Title	Length
1.	"Down"	3:13
2.	"Head"	2:46
3.	"Head" (Titan A.E.)	3:46
4.	"S.O.M."	3:24
5.	"So Real"	5:41
6.	"I Am" (Unedited)	2:54
7.	"Wisconsin Death Trip" (Unedited)	3:41
8.	"Love Dump" (Demo)	4:26
9.	"I'm with Stupid" (Single Edit)	2:57
10.	"December" (Unedited)	14:15

== Personnel ==
Credits taken from the CD liner notes.

=== Static-X ===
- Wayne Static – lead vocals, rhythm guitar, programming
- Koichi Fukuda – lead guitar, keyboards, programming
- Tony Campos – bass, backing vocals
- Ken Jay – drums

=== Technical ===
- Ulrich Wild – production, engineering, mixing at Master Control, Burbank, CA
- Michael "Elvis" Baskette – recording assistant
- Jeff Robinson – assistant mixing
- Tom Baker – mastering at Future Disc

== Charts ==
Chart (1999–2000)	Peak position
US Billboard 200	107
US Heatseekers Albums (Billboard)	1

== Certifications ==
Region	Certification	Certified units/sales
United States (RIAA)	Platinum	1,000,000^{^}
^{^} Shipments figures based on certification alone.
