= Tony Campos =

American metal bassist (born 1973)

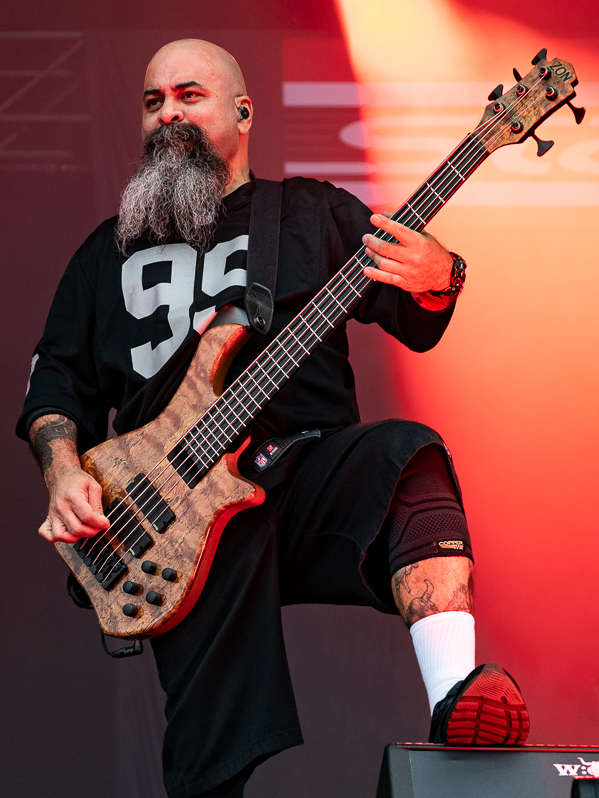
- Campos performing with Static-X in 2025

Background information
- Also known as: Maldito X
- Born: Antonio Campos; March 8, 1973 (age 53); Los Angeles, California, U.S.
- Genres: Industrial metal; nu metal; groove metal; death metal; alternative metal
- Occupation: Musician
- Instruments: Bass; vocals
- Years active: 1994–present
- Member of: Static-X; Asesino; Fear Factory
- Formerly of: Buck Satan and the 666 Shooters; Ministry; Prong; Possessed; Soulfly; Cavalera Conspiracy

Antonio Campos (born March 8, 1973) is an American musician. He is the current bassist for the industrial metal bands Static-X and Fear Factory as well as the vocalist and bassist for the extreme metal band Asesino. He has previously played with Prong, Soulfly, Ministry, and Possessed. Following the death of lead vocalist and rhythm guitarist Wayne Static and the resurrection of Static-X, Campos is the longest-serving member of the group and the only one to appear on every album.

== Career ==
Campos was part of the original lineup of Static-X, playing bass and performing backing vocals on all of the group's studio albums. Along with Wayne Static, he was one of the legal owners of the Static-X name, even though he did not participate in the band's temporary reunion from 2012 to 2013.

In 2001, Campos broke his collarbone in a motorcycle accident, leaving him unable to play in the Extreme Steel Tour, headlined by Pantera. He continued to sing backing vocals on the tour, and Marty O'Brien took over bass duties with Static-X. He was also mentioned to be working with Brujeria but would later explain that he simply filled in on bass during a rehearsal when regular band member Shane Embury was late.

In 2002, Campos joined the Mexican-American metal group Asesino. His stage name, "Maldito X", is Spanish for "Damned X".

Campos was a member of Buck Satan and the 666 Shooters from 2006 to 2012, and he played bass with Ministry during four stints (2007–2008, 2011–2012, 2014–2016, 2017–2019), following the death of Paul Raven.

From 2011 to 2012, he was a member of the death metal band Possessed. In 2011, he also joined Soulfly, remaining with the band until 2015, when he joined Fear Factory. He has also toured with Cavalera Conspiracy, in 2012–2014, 2016–2017, and 2020.

In October 2018, Campos announced that he and the other two surviving original members of Static-X—guitarist Koichi Fukuda and drummer Ken Jay—had reformed the band and were planning to release a new album and tour in 2019 in memory of Wayne Static, who had died in 2014.

== Influences ==
Campos has cited Blasko, Cliff Burton, Dan Lilker, Jeff Hanneman, and Kerry King as influences.

== Equipment ==
- Zon Legacy 5-string with EMG MM5CS pickups
- Neal Moser Custom Shop Scimitar (P-bass style) 4-string with EMG-P pickup, tuned BbFBbEb
- Fernandes Tremor 5-strings with EMG-40DC pickups, tuned BbFBbEbAb
- SWR SM-900 head, SWR Goliath Senior 6x10 cab
- Tech 21 SansAmp PSA-1 preamp, Dunlop 105Q Bass Wah, Line 6 Bass POD
- Fernandes five-string signature Tremor bass guitars with EMG-40HZ and MM5CS pickups

== Personal life ==
Campos majored in computer science before becoming a musician. He is a video gamer and considers the Doom and Halo series his all-time favorites.

== Discography ==
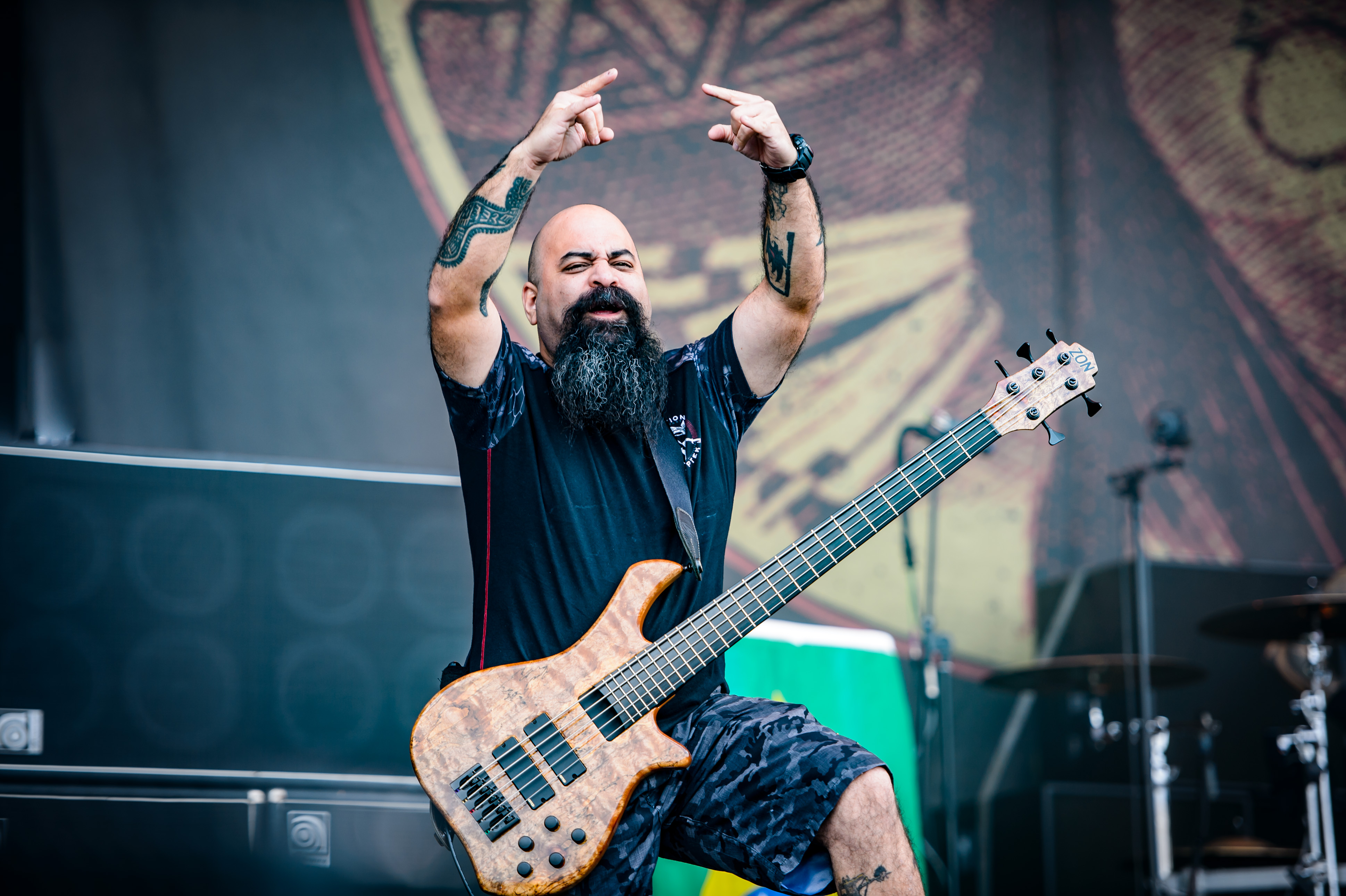
Campos performing with Cavalera Conspiracy at Wacken Open Air 2017

=== Static-X ===
- Wisconsin Death Trip (1999)
- Machine (2001)
- Shadow Zone (2003)
- Start a War (2005)
- Cannibal (2007)
- Cult of Static (2009)
- Project: Regeneration Vol. 1 (2020)
- Project: Regeneration Vol. 2 (2024)

=== Asesino ===
- Corridos de Muerte (2002)
- Cristo Satánico (2006)

=== Buck Satan and the 666 Shooters ===
- Bikers Welcome Ladies Drink Free (2011)

=== Ministry ===
- Relapse (2012)
- From Beer to Eternity (2013)
- AmeriKKKant (2018)

=== Soulfly ===
- Enslaved (2012)
- Savages (2013)
- Archangel (2015)

=== Prong ===
- Carved into Stone (2012)

=== Attika 7 ===
- Blood of My Enemies (2012)

=== Fear Factory ===
- Roboticist (2027)

=== As guest member ===
Year	Band	Album	Track(s)
2007	Divine Heresy	Bleed the Fifth	"Rise of the Scorned" and "Closure"
2011	Otep	Atavist	"Drunk on the Blood of Saints" and "Remember to Forget"
2015	Taipan	Straight from the Underground	"Straight from the Underground"
2020	Mick Gordon	Doom Eternal soundtrack	Member of the "Heavy Metal Choir"
