= Koichi Fukuda =

Japanese musician (born 1975)

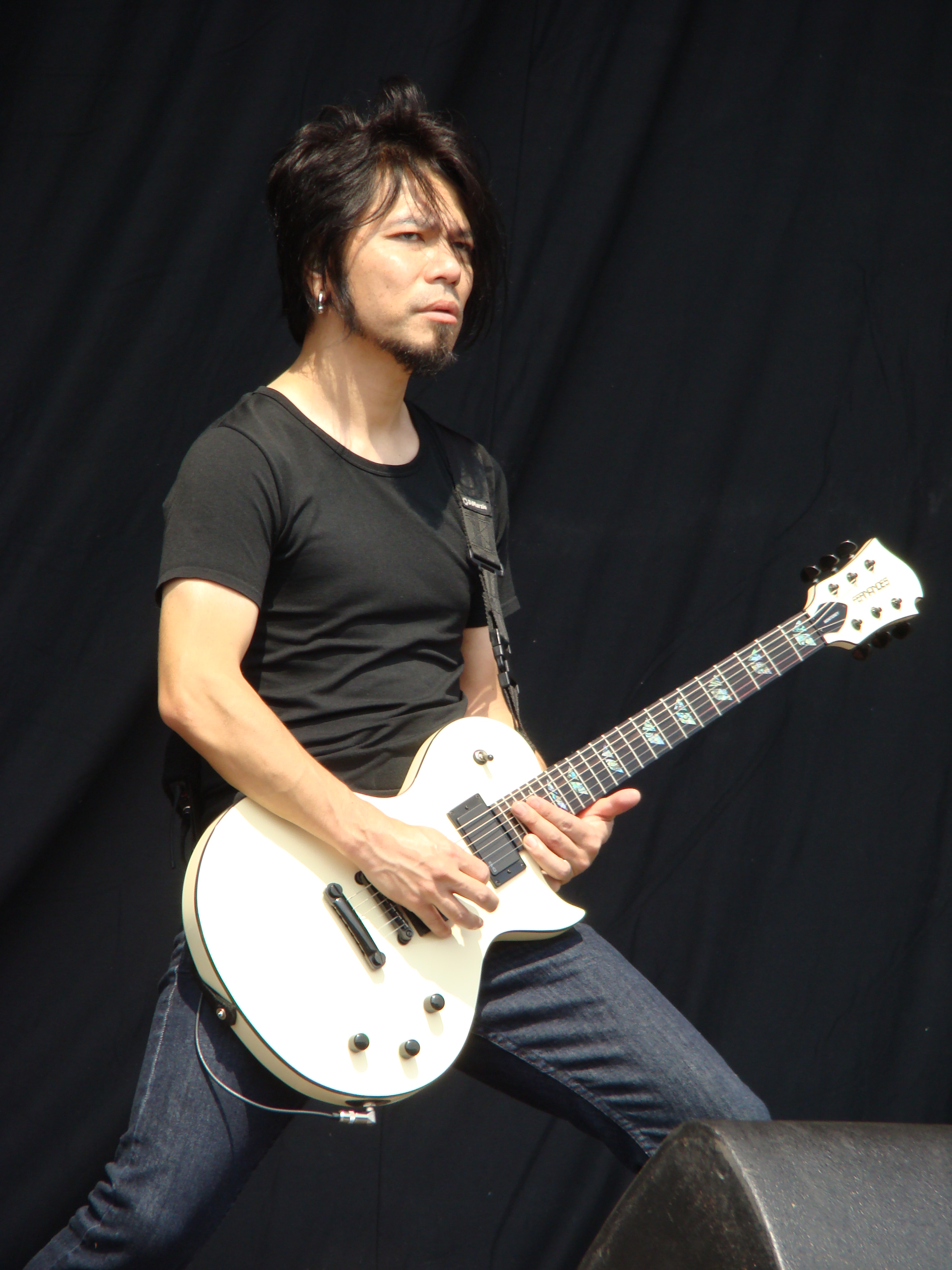
- Fukuda at Gods of Metal 2009

Background information
- Born: July 1, 1975 (age 51); Kawachinagano, Osaka, Japan
- Genres: Industrial metal; nu metal; alternative metal
- Occupation: Musician
- Instruments: Guitar; keyboards
- Years active: 1994–present
- Member of: Static-X
- Formerly of: Bellusira; Drugstore Fanatics; Revolve
- Website: static-x.com

Koichi Fukuda (born July 1, 1975) is a Japanese musician, best known as the lead guitarist, programmer, keyboardist, and co-founder of the American industrial metal band Static-X; he has been a member of the band three times, initially from 1994 to 2000, again from 2005 to 2010 and since 2018. He was also the former lead guitarist of the bands Drugstore Fanatics and Bellusira.

== Biography ==
He was present on Static-X's debut album, Wisconsin Death Trip (1999). Fukada contributed to their second album Machine (2001), but quit the band early in the recording sessions citing personal problems stemming from their heavy touring schedule.

Between his stints in Static-X, he formed the band Revolve. With a different sound drawing comparisons to Tool and Pink Floyd, they were successful locally and played several concerts in and around the Los Angeles area. Revolve released several demos as free downloads on their website, and released one EP containing several reworked versions of previously released demos, as well as a few new tracks.

He rejoined Static-X after guitarist Tripp Eisen was fired at the end of the recording process of the 2005 album Start a War, and was present to record their fifth album, Cannibal.

On Fukuda's rejoining into the band, frontman Wayne Static said:

We invited [Fukuda] back to do some programming on the record (Start a War). Then Tripp got arrested ... My first thought was let's ask Koichi if he wants to rejoin. I just crossed my fingers and, lucky for us, he said yes. Koichi was with us back in the club days here in Los Angeles, played on our first record, Wisconsin Death Trip, and did the first two years of touring with the band. He's been in the studio with us since October working on the new record and this feels like a very natural transition.

In 2010, Fukuda joined Drugstore Fanatics.

Fukuda contributed to the KMFDM album WTF?! (2011) playing guitar on the song "Come On – Go Off".

Fukuda also contributed to Wednesday 13's 2011 remix EP "Re-Animated". The tracks from the EP were re-released as part of Disc 4 for Wednesday's "Dead Meat: 10 Years of Blood, Feathers & Lipstick" box set under the Disc title: "Re-Animated Resurrected". The disc also featured extra remixes by Koichi.

In 2015, Fukuda was in the Australian rock band Bellusira, working out of Los Angeles.

In October 2018 it was announced Fukuda would join a reunion of Static X, along with the other two surviving original members, bassist Tony Campos and drummer Ken Jay. They planned to release a new album and tour in 2019 in honor of the memory of their former bandmate Wayne Static who died in 2014. The first of those albums, which had since been announced as being split into two parts, titled Project Regeneration Vol. 1, was released in July 2020.

Fukuda has a son born in 2008.

== Equipment ==
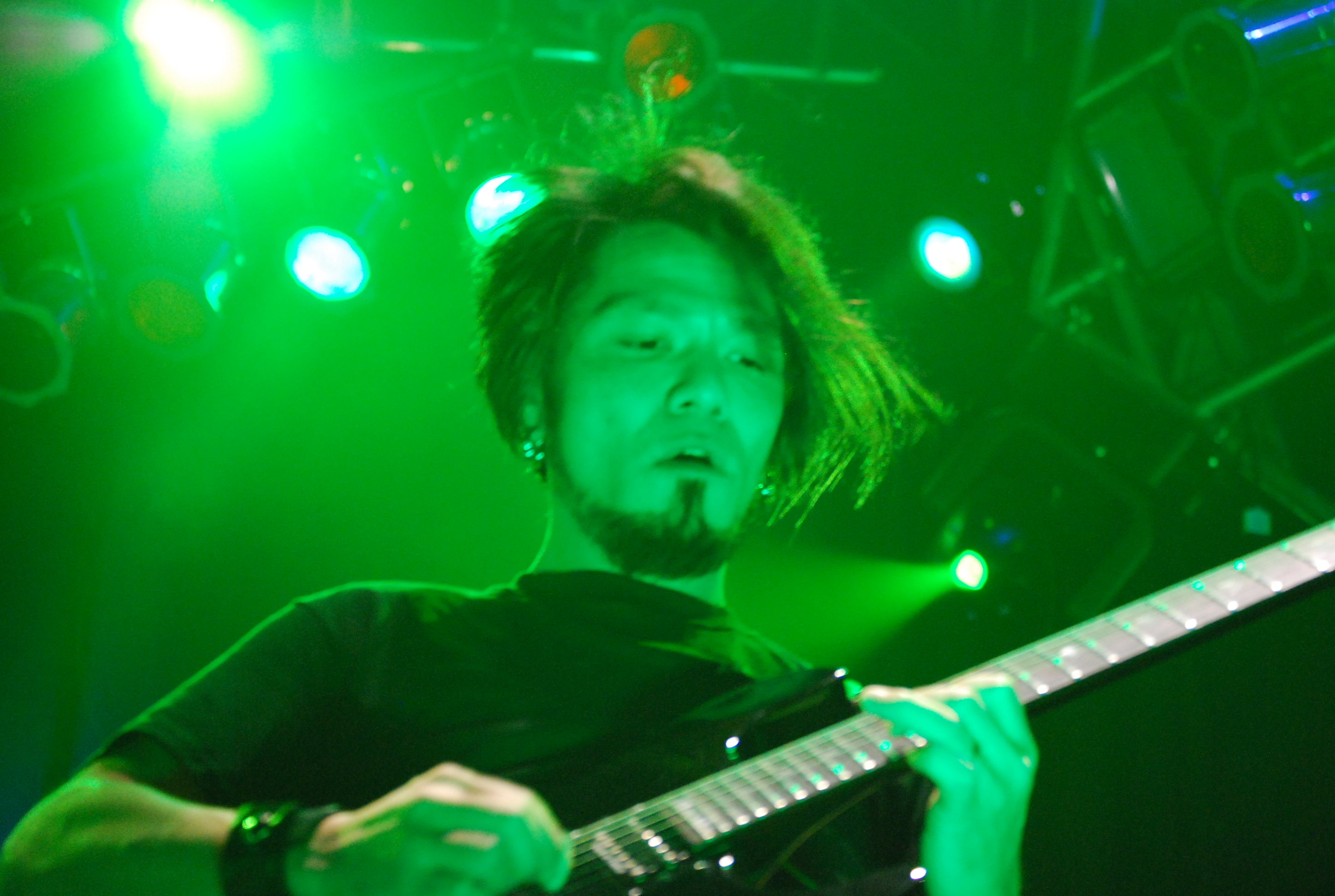
Fukuda in 2007

- ESP Guitars and Ibanez Guitars (particularly favoring the RGR models, with reverse headstock)
- Fernandes Monterey Deluxe and Revolver Elite Ltd.
- EMG 60AX, 81X, 89X, SAX, EXG, and SPC pickups and tone controls
- Seymour Duncan Distortion and Custom bridge pickups, with a Cool Rails in the neck position.
- Hughes & Kettner Switchblade heads.
- Digitech GSP-1101 effects unit.
- Electro-Voice digital wireless system. (the same one Wayne Static used)
