= Wayne Static =

American musician (1965–2014)

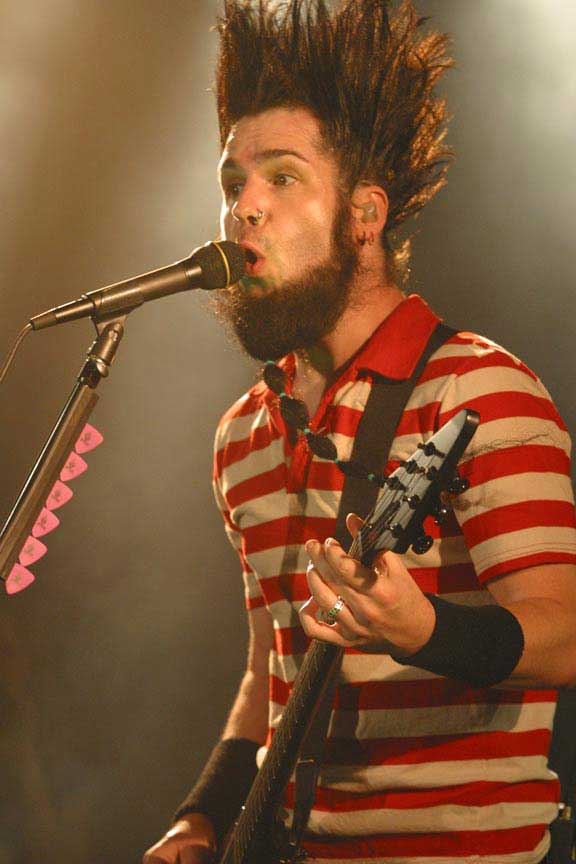
- Static performing in 2005
- Born: Wayne Richard Wells; November 4, 1965; Muskegon, Michigan, U.S.
- Died: November 1, 2014 (aged 48); Landers, California, U.S.
- Cause of death: Combined drug intoxication
- Other names: Wayne Static; The King of Evil Disco; Mr. Static
- Occupations: Musician; singer; songwriter
- Spouse: Tera Wray (m. 2008)
- Musical career
- Genres: Industrial metal; nu metal; groove metal; alternative metal
- Instruments: Vocals; guitar; keyboards
- Years active: 1987–2014
- Formerly of: Static-X; Deep Blue Dream

Wayne Richard Wells (November 4, 1965 – November 1, 2014), known professionally as Wayne Static, was an American musician, best known as the lead vocalist, rhythm guitarist, keyboardist, and primary lyricist for the industrial metal band Static-X, of which he was the only constant member until his death in 2014. He also released a solo album, Pighammer, in 2011. Static was recognizable for his unusual hairstyle; his hair was held up in a vertical position, a process that took about 25–45 minutes to complete (according to his mother). He was also known for his signature "chintail" beard.

== Early life ==
Wayne Richard Wells was born on November 4, 1965, in Muskegon, Michigan, to Richard and Darlene Wells. He grew up in Shelby, Michigan before moving to Chicago, Illinois and California. He was three years old when he received his first toy guitar. His parents decided at age seven to get him his first real guitar, an S12 beginner model. Wells was given lessons, which paid off a year later when he won a talent contest playing "Skip to My Lou". He later played in his first band at the age of 12 and decided he wanted to be a musician. In high school, Wells played in a band for the dances with classmates. He attended Shelby High School and had summer jobs which included working as an asparagus picker and in a cherry canning factory.

== Career ==
After moving to Chicago, Wells created the post-punk band Deep Blue Dream in 1987 with drummer Ken Jay and bass player Eric Harris. They shared rehearsal space with Billy Corgan, who was just starting the band Smashing Pumpkins. Corgan would end up playing a few shows with them, eventually opting to focus on his own band. Deep Blue Dream was short lived as Wells and Jay relocated to California. In California, Wells and Jay formed Static-X along with Tony Campos on bass and Koichi Fukuda on guitar. It was at this point Wells adopted the name Wayne Static.

Static announced in July 2007 that he would begin a side project, Pighammer, but in a December 2007 interview with Ultimate-Guitar.com, Static stated: "The Pighammer thing will happen when I have time. At the moment though, Static-X will remain my main priority." Static appeared on the cover of the 2009 Static-X release Cult of Static.

His solo album Pighammer was released on October 4, 2011. As part of his Pighammer solo project, Static formed a new line-up consisting of Brent Ashley on bass, Sean Davidson on drums, and Ashes on guitar. In 2012, this line-up went under the name Static-X for the Noise Revolution tour. However, in October 2012, the remainder of the tour was cancelled due to Static requiring medical treatment.

In an interview done on November 26, 2013, it was confirmed that Static-X disbanded in June 2013. According to Static, the disputes between himself and the band's former bassist Tony Campos over the rights to the band name had gone too far, forcing him to disband the four-piece.

He had been set to play a co-headlining tour in the U.S. with Powerman 5000 in November 2014 with American Head Charge supporting them.

== Artistry ==
Eli Enis of Revolver described Static's vocal style as sounding like "Serj Tankian at his growliest and Jonathan Davis at his most amped-up." He also said: "Static not only looked but also sounded like he was being shocked with a stun-gun — his voice surging out of his throat with a cartoonish fortitude."

== Equipment ==
=== Guitars ===
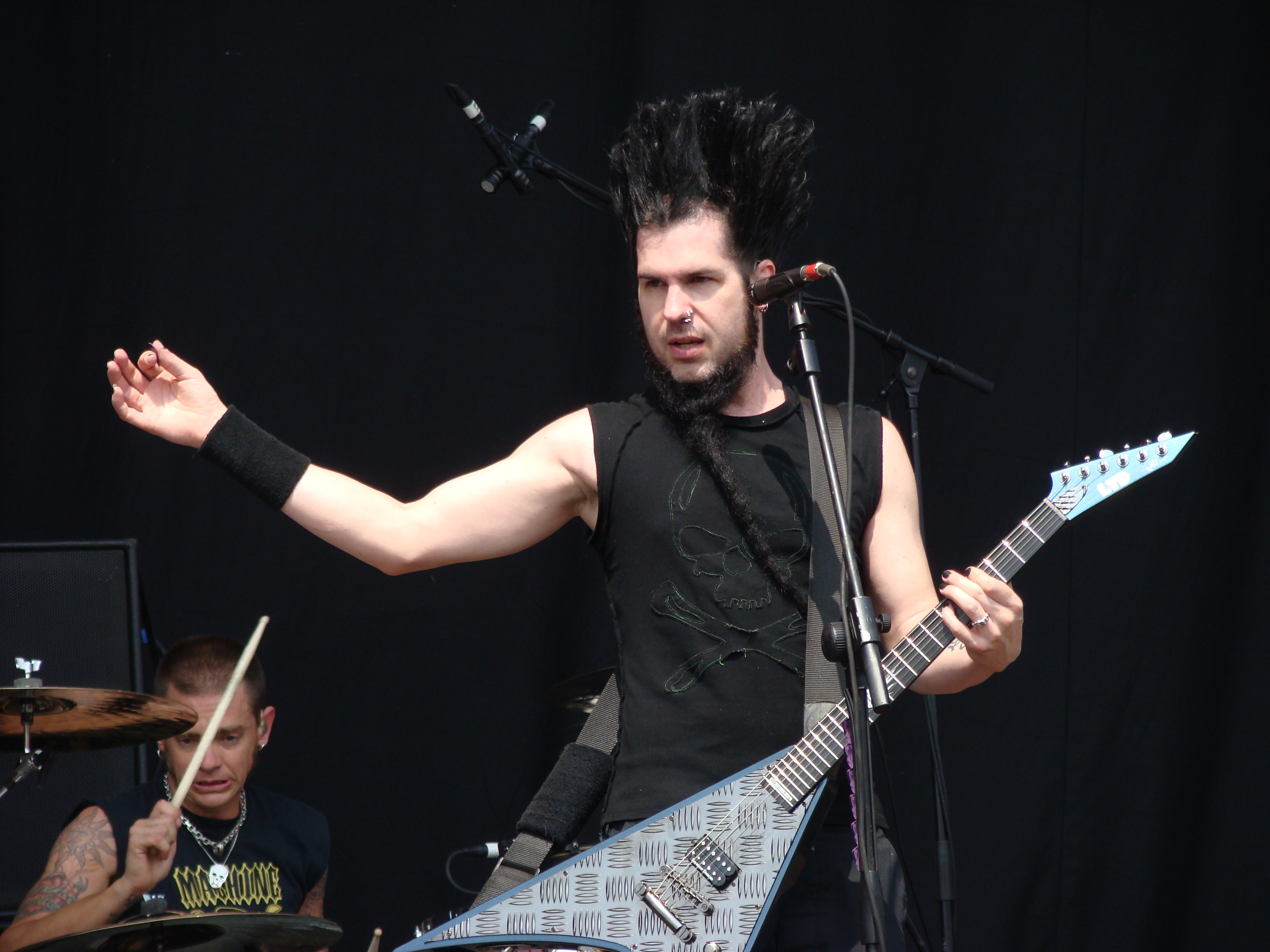
Static performing at Gods of Metal 2009

Static installed a single Seymour Duncan SH-6B 'Distortion' humbucker in all his guitar's bridge positions; until switching to EMG 81's in 2012 after signing with Dean. His signature Epiphone, ESP LTD, and Dean guitars did not come with neck pickups as he did not use them.

Static used a Gibson Flying V from early in his career; seen in the videos up until 2003.

Static also used a Gibson Explorer; as seen in the music video for "I'm with Stupid".

In 2004, Epiphone released a Wayne Static signature Flying V Guitar. "Special features on the Static model include a single volume control and one toggle switch for the two Epiphone USA pickups, no pickguard, Ebony fingerboard with no inlays, black hardware, Plain Black satin finish, and the Static-X logo on the headstock."

In 2007, ESP produced the ESP Ltd Static-600 Wayne Static Signature Guitar. It featured an Explorer-shaped body, single Seymour Duncan Distortion humbucker, and nickel/diamond-plated scratchplate covering the entire mahogany body, as seen in live photographs.

In 2009, ESP produced the ESP LTD Static-600V GMB as Static's new signature guitar. It featured a Flying-V-shaped body with diamond plate metal screwed to the front of the body, black hardware, and Static X logo at the 12th fret.

In 2012, Static joined Dean guitars and started playing custom ML Modifier. Until his death, Static played Dean guitars as an endorsee. While Dean did not release a Static signature model, Dean did produce a series of custom models for Static; fitted with his standard single bridge humbucker and single volume control.

=== Amps ===
For his live tone, Static used a simple Marshall MG100HDFX. The MG100HDFX was one of the cheapest solid state amps made by Marshall during Static's touring time with Static X. On tour, Static could easily and cheaply get a replacement if the amp broke. Amps breaking were not a common problem as solid state amps like the MG100HDFX are less prone to breaking than tube amps, another reason for its selection.

Static's cabinet of choice was the Marshall 1960A.

As of the "Cult of Static" tour in 2009, all of Static-X ditched the traditionally used touring amps and cabinets for a Line 6 Pod XT Pro direct to P.A. sound set up and maintained by longtime guitar tech Erik Fincher.

== Personal life ==
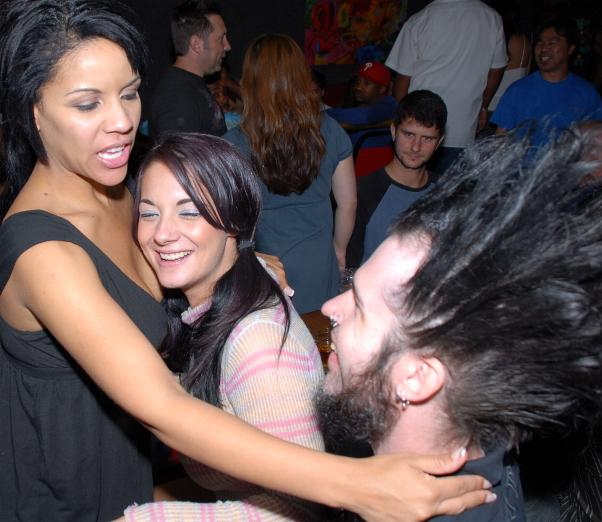
Static with his wife Tera Wray (center) in 2007

Static was an atheist and pescatarian. After a brief courtship, he married adult film actress Tera Wray in Las Vegas on January 10, 2008. They lived in Joshua Tree, California. Static appeared as a mystery guest on an adult film Wray hosted called Radium Vol 2.

On January 13, 2016, Wray died in her friend's Joshua Tree, California apartment from an apparent suicide. Her body was discovered the next day.

== Death ==
Static died on November 1, 2014, in Landers, California, three days before his 49th birthday. He had consumed oxycodone as well as alcohol that morning before going to bed with his wife. She woke up later that day to find that he had died in his sleep. His publicist issued a statement which claimed that Static and Wray had stopped using "hard drugs" in 2009 and that his death was "not a drug-related incident." However, an autopsy later confirmed that Static had died of multiple prescription drug toxicity involving the opioid painkillers oxycodone and hydromorphone, the anti-anxiety medication alprazolam (Xanax), and alcohol. The report also noted that years of past "chronic prescription drug and alcohol abuse" was a contributing factor. Static-X members Koichi Fukuda and Tony Campos paid tribute to Static. Static was cremated in California. A memorial show followed in Los Angeles, and a family service followed in Illinois.

== Solo band members ==
=== Final line-up ===
- Wayne Static – lead vocals, rhythm guitar, keyboards, programming (2011–2014; his death)
- Diego "Ashes" Ibarra – lead guitar (2011–2014)
- Sean "The Animal" Davidson – drums (2011–2014)
- Andy "The Kid" Cole – bass, backing vocals (2012–2014)

=== Former members ===
- Brent Ashley – bass, backing vocals (2011–2012)

== Discography ==
=== Solo ===
Studio albums

Year	Album	Chart peaks			
Year	Album	US	US Rock	US Ind.	US Hard Rock
2011	Pighammer: Released: October 4, 2011; Label: Dirthouse; Formats: CD, DI	97	22	16	7

Singles

- 2011 – "Assassins of Youth"

=== Collaborations ===
- 2000 – Dead Prez & Wayne Static – "Hip Hop"
- 2000 – Mephisto Odyssey & Static-X – "Crash"
- 2002 – Jonathan Davis & Richard Gibbs featuring Wayne Static – "Not Meant for Me"
- 2003 – Godhead featuring Wayne Static – "The Giveaway"
- 2004 – Skinny Puppy featuring Wayne Static – "Use Less"
- 2006 – SOiL featuring Wayne Static – "Give It Up"
- 2008 – Opiate for the Masses featuring Wayne Static – "21st Century Time Bomb"
- 2009 – Dirge Within featuring Wayne Static - "Inhuman"
- 2010 – Raymond Herrera & Wayne Static – "Decimator"
- 2011 – 9 Electric featuring Wayne Static – "Destroy As You Go"
- 2013 – DMC from Run-DMC featuring Wayne Static – "Noise Revolution"

=== Appearances ===
- 2000 - Static appeared in Mephisto Odyssey's music video for "Crash" alongside Koichi Fukuda & Mikael Johnston. The video was directed by Len Wiseman and appeared on the Batman Beyond: Return of the Joker DVD and Blu-Ray.
- 2002 – Static appeared in The X-Ecutioners music video "It's Goin' Down", along with Mike Shinoda and Mr. Hahn of Linkin Park
- 2006 – Static appeared in Silent Civilian's video "Rebirth of The Temple"
- 2009 – Static appeared in 98 Rockfest in Tampa, Florida
- 2010 – Static appeared as a villain in Issue 4 of the Eternal Descent Comic Book series
