= List of Dope band members =

American nu metal band

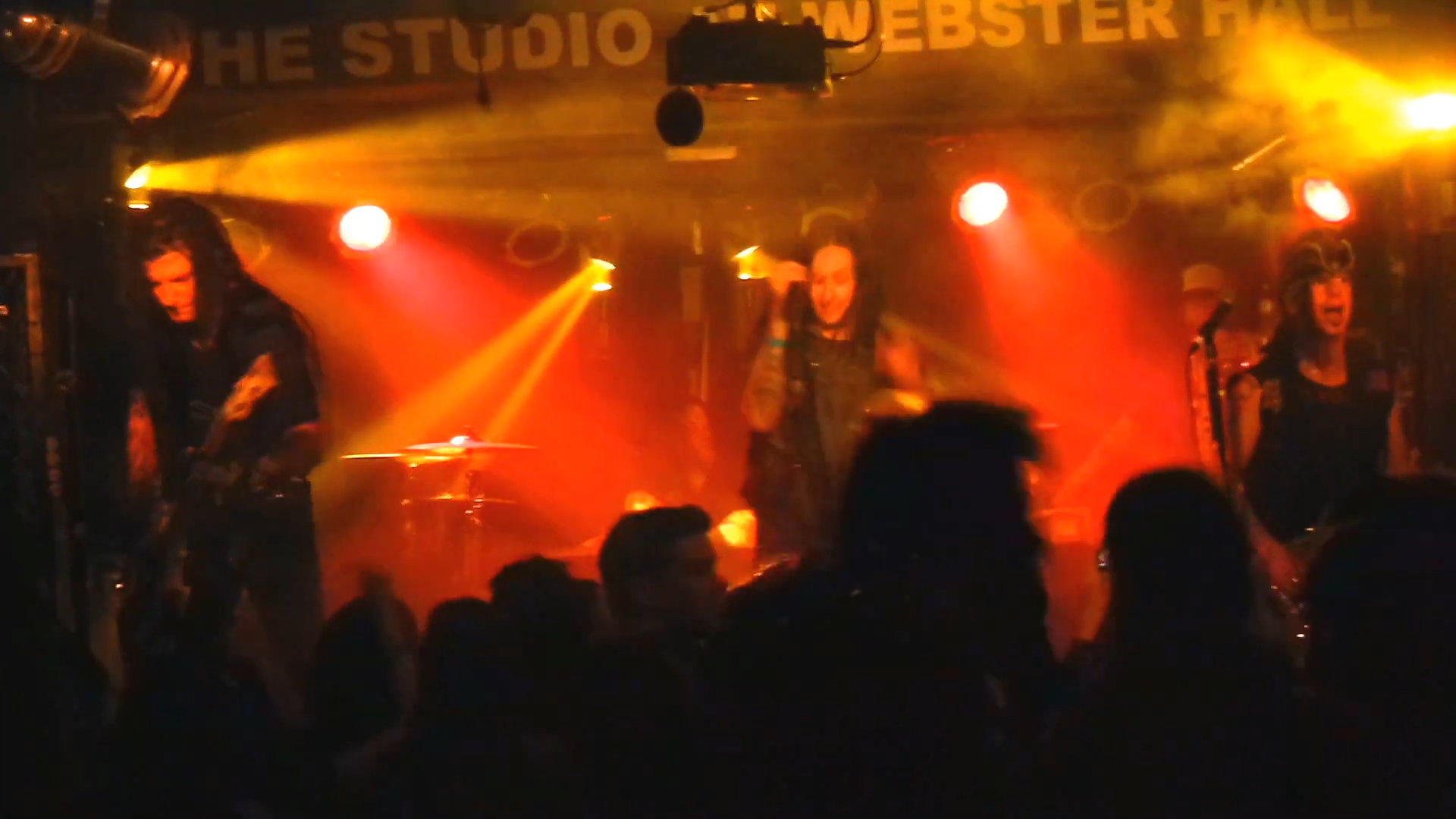
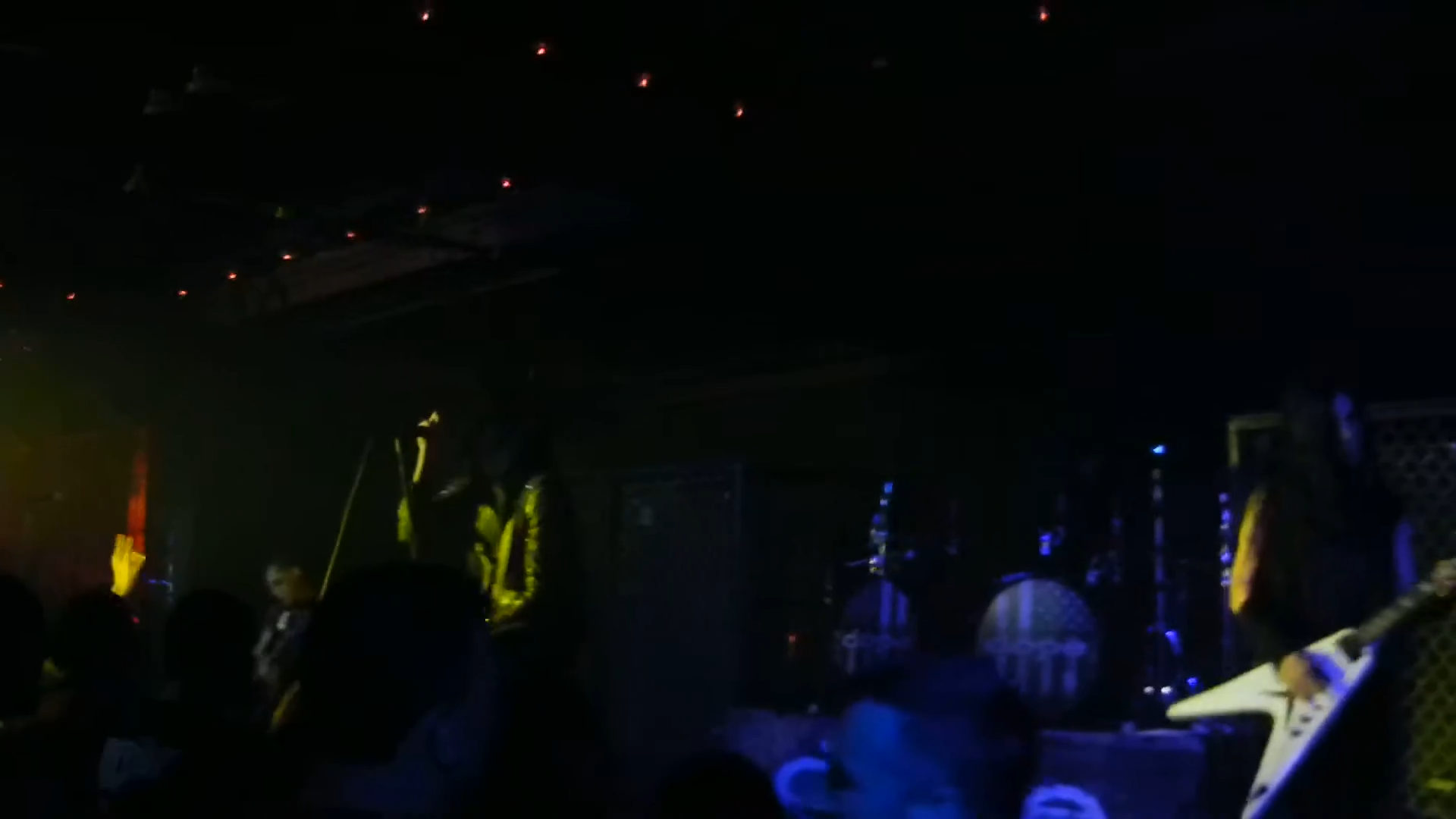
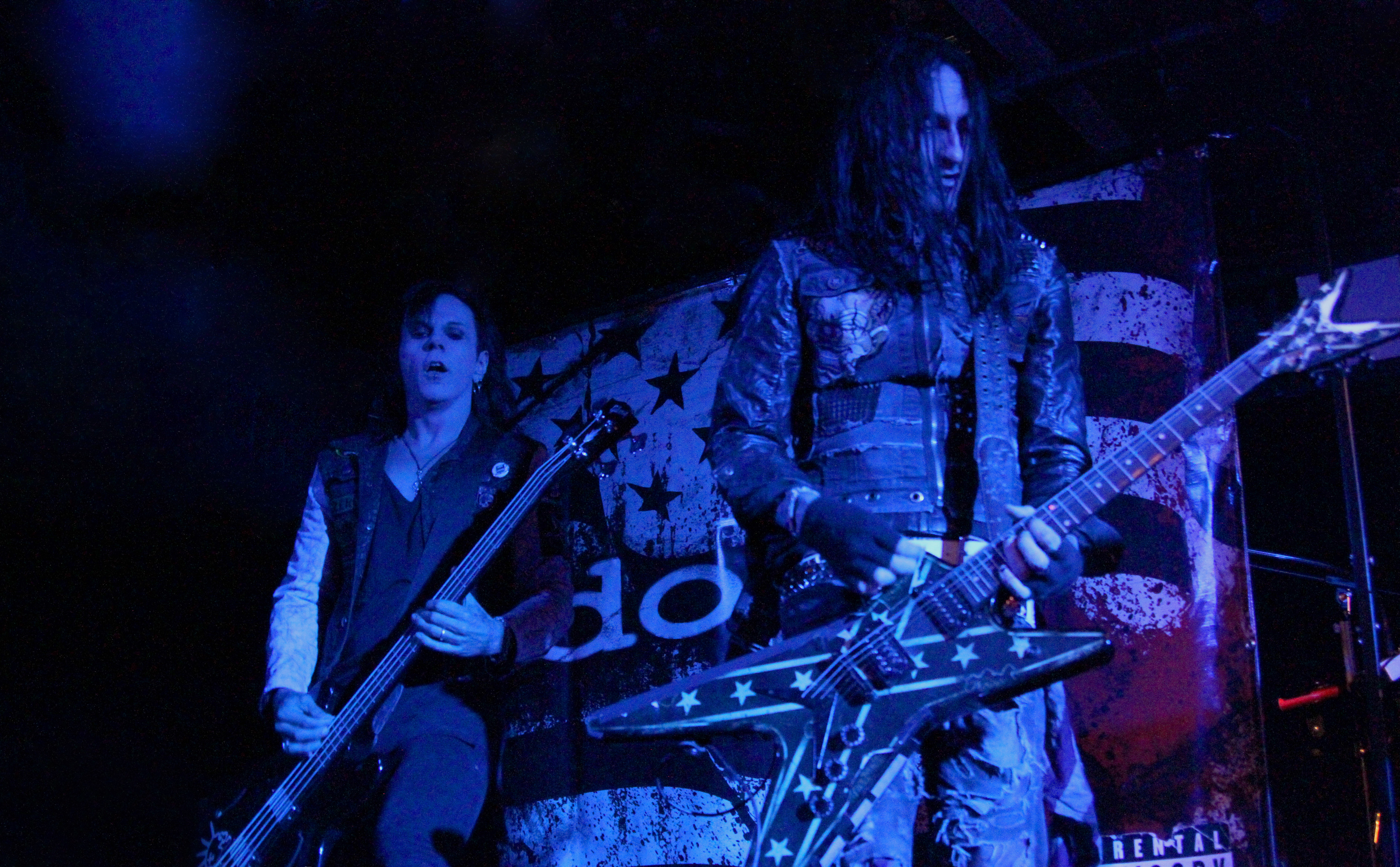
Three line-ups of Dope performing in 2013, 2013 and 2015

Dope is an American Industrial/nu metal band founded in New York City by brothers Edsel (vocals, rhythm guitar) and Simon Dope (keyboards, samples) in 1997. The pair then recruited Sloane Jentry as lead guitarist, Preston Nash as drummer, and Tripp Eisen as bassist. The band currently consists of vocalist, rhythm guitarist and keyboardist Edsel, alongside guitarist and bassist Acey Slade (who first joined in 1998), lead guitarist and keyboardist Virus (who first joined in 2000), bassist and drummer Daniel Fox (who first joined in 2004), and drummer Chris Warner (who first joined in 2017).

== History ==
Sloane Jentry soon left the band in early 1999. In his absence, Tripp Eisen moved onto guitar, while Acey Slade was brought in on bass. In November 2000, Eisen was fired from the band, Nash also left at the same time. Producer/guitarist Virus joined on lead guitar, while Slade moved to rhythm guitar, Jentry rejoined on bass, and Adrian Ost joined on drums, although he was soon replaced by Racci Shay. After releasing Life in 2001, Slade left the band to join Murderdolls in mid-2002.

In late 2002, Simon Dope left the group to pursue a career as a video game producer. Shortly before a tour in early 2004, Jentry again left the band, Shay moved onto bass, and Adrian Ost briefly rejoined on drums. Brix Milner joined as permanent bassist in May and Shay moved back to drums. Drum tech Daniel Fox briefly took over drums in September 2005 when Shay left due to family issues. Ben Graves joined as touring drummer in October.

By 2006, Angel Bartolotta joined on drums. Milner departed by 2007, he was replaced by Derrick "Tripp" Tribbett.

A new line-up appeared in 2013, consisting of one time drummer Daniel Fox (who had gone on to play with Mushroomhead), new guitarist Nikk Dibs and new bassist Jerms Genske. In 2015, Slade and Shay returned, touring alongside Dibs and Dope. Virus returned for a classic line-up reunion in late 2015.

Fox and Dibs (this time on bass) returned to replace Shay and Slade in 2017. Fox was soon replaced by Chris Warner in October 2017, Slade replaced Dibs in late 2018. Fox returned in May 2019.

Since 2023, the band has had a fluid line-up with Virus and Acey Slade alternating lead guitar duties, due to their commitments to teaching and Misfits respectively. Daniel Fox alternates between drums and bass, and Chris Warner plays drums when needed.

== Members ==
=== Current ===
Image	Name	Years active	Instruments	Release contributions
	Edsel Dope (Brian Ebejer)	1997–present	lead vocals; programming; rhythm guitar (1997–2000, 2002–present); keyboards (2002–present)	all releases
	Acey Slade (Emil Schmidt)	1999–2002; 2015–2017; 2018–present	rhythm guitar (1999–2002, 2024–present); lead guitar (2023–present); backing vocals; bass (1999–2000, 2015–2017, 2018–2023, 2024–present)	Felons and Revolutionaries (1999); Life (2001); Live from Moscow, Russia (2016); Live & Rare (2019); Blood Money Part Zer0 (2023)
	Virus (Andre Karkos)	2000–2013; 2015–present	lead guitar; backing vocals; keyboards (2002–2013, 2015–present)	all releases from Life (2001) onwards
	Daniel Fox	2005–2006 (touring); 2013–2015; 2017; 2019–present	bass (2023–present); drums	Blood Money Part Zer0 (2023)
	Chris Warner	2017–2019; 2023–present (touring)	drums	none to date

=== Former ===
Image	Name	Years active	Instruments	Release contributions
	Simon Dope (Erikh Ebejer)	1997–2002	keyboards; samples; programming; percussion	all releases from Felons and Revolutionaries (1999) to Felons for Life (2002); The Early Years - New York City 1997/1998 (2017); Live & Rare (2019)
	Tripp Eisen (Tod Rex Salvador)	1997–2000	bass (1997–1999); lead guitar (1999–2000)	Felons and Revolutionaries (1999); The Early Years - New York City 1997/1998 (2017); Live & Rare (2019)
	Preston Nash	1997–2000	drums	Felons and Revolutionaries (1999); The Early Years - New York City 1997/1998 (2017); Live & Rare (2019)
	Sloane "Mosey" Jentry	1997–1999; 2000–2004	lead guitar (1997–1999); bass (2000–2004)	Life (2001); Felons for Life (2002); Group Therapy (2003)
	Adrian Ost	2000–2001; 2004 (touring)	drums	none
	Racci "Sketchy" Shay Hart	2001–2005; 2015–2017	drums; bass (2004)	all releases from Life (2001) to American Apathy (2005); Live from Moscow Russia (2016); Live & Rare (2019)
	Brian "Brix" Milner	2004–2007	bass	American Apathy (2005)
	Andrew "Angel" Bartolotta	2006–2013	drums	No Regrets (2009)
	Derrick "Tripp" Tribbett	2007–2013	bass; backing vocals	No Regrets (2009)
	Nikk Dibs	2013–2015; 2017–2018	lead guitar (2013–2015); bass (2017–2018); keyboards; backing vocals	Blood Money Part 1 (2016); Blood Money Part Zer0 (2023)
	Jeremy "Jerms" Genske	2013–2015	bass; backing vocals	Blood Money Part 1 (2016) backing vocals on one track as Jerms Jude

=== Touring ===
Image	Name	Years active	Instruments	Notes
	Ben Graves	2005	drums	
	Koichi Fukuda	2025	lead guitar	

== Line-ups ==
Period	Members	Releases
1997 – January 1999	Edsel Dope – lead vocals, rhythm guitar, programming; Simon Dope – keyboards, samples, programming, percussion; Sloane Jentry – lead guitar; Tripp Eisen – bass; Preston Nash – drums	The Early Years - New York City 1997/1998 (2017); Live & Rare (2019) six tracks
January 1999 – November 2000	Edsel Dope – lead vocals, rhythm guitar, programming; Simon Dope – keyboards, samples, programming, percussion; Tripp Eisen – lead guitar; Preston Nash – drums; Acey Slade – bass, backing vocals	Felons and Revolutionaries (1999)
November 2000 – early 2001	Edsel Dope – lead vocals, programming; Simon Dope – keyboards, samples, programming, percussion; Acey Slade – rhythm guitar, backing vocals; Virus – lead guitar, backing vocals; Sloane Jentry – bass; Adrian Ost – drums	
Early 2001 – August 2002	Edsel Dope – lead vocals, programming; Simon Dope – keyboards, samples, programming, percussion; Acey Slade – rhythm guitar, backing vocals; Virus – lead guitar, backing vocals; Sloane Jentry – bass; Racci Shay – drums	Life (2001)
August – November 2002	Edsel Dope – lead vocals, rhythm guitar, programming; Simon Dope – keyboards, samples, programming, percussion; Virus – lead guitar, backing vocals; Sloane Jentry – bass; Racci Shay – drums	Felons for Life (2002)
November 2002 – January 2004	Edsel Dope – lead vocals, rhythm guitar, programming, keyboards; Virus – lead guitar, backing vocals, keyboards; Sloane Jentry – bass; Racci Shay – drums	Group Therapy (2003)
January – May 2004	Edsel Dope – lead vocals, rhythm guitar, programming, keyboards; Virus – lead guitar, backing vocals, keyboards; Racci Shay – bass, studio drums; Adrian Ost – live drums	
May 2004 – September 2005	Edsel Dope – lead vocals, rhythm guitar, programming, keyboards; Virus – lead guitar, backing vocals, keyboards; Racci Shay – drums; Brix Milner – bass	American Apathy (2005)
September – October 2005	Edsel Dope – lead vocals, rhythm guitar, programming, keyboards; Virus – lead guitar, backing vocals, keyboards; Brix Milner – bass; Daniel Fox – drums	
October 2005 – mid 2006	Edsel Dope – lead vocals, rhythm guitar, programming, keyboards; Virus – lead guitar, backing vocals, keyboards; Brix Milner – bass; Ben Graves – drums	
mid 2006 – early 2007	Edsel Dope – lead vocals, rhythm guitar, programming, keyboards; Virus – lead guitar, backing vocals, keyboards; Brix Milner – bass; Angel Bartolotta – drums	
February 2007 – September 2013	Edsel Dope – lead vocals, rhythm guitar, programming, keyboards; Virus – lead guitar, backing vocals, keyboards; Angel Bartolotta – drums; Derrick Tribbett – bass, backing vocals	No Regrets (2009)
September 2013 – May 2015	Edsel Dope – lead vocals, rhythm guitar, programming, keyboards; Daniel Fox – drums; Nikk Dibs – lead guitar, keyboards, backing vocals; Jerms Genske – bass, backing vocals	
May 2015	Edsel Dope – lead vocals, rhythm guitar, programming, keyboards; Nikk Dibs – lead guitar, backing vocals, keyboards; Acey Slade – bass, backing vocals; Racci Shay – drums	Blood Money Part 1 (2016) Edsel and Dibs only
mid 2015 – early 2017	Edsel Dope – lead vocals, rhythm guitar, programming, keyboards; Acey Slade – bass, backing vocals; Racci Shay – drums; Virus – lead guitar, backing vocals, keyboards	Blood Money Part 1 (2016) Edsel and Virus only; Live from Moscow Russia (2016); Live & Rare (2019) remaining tracks
February – October 2017	Edsel Dope – lead vocals, rhythm guitar, programming, keyboards; Virus – lead guitar, backing vocals, keyboards; Daniel Fox – drums; Nikk Dibs – bass, backing vocals, keyboards	Blood Money Part Zer0 (2023)
October 2017 – mid 2018	Edsel Dope – lead vocals, rhythm guitar, programming, keyboards; Virus – lead guitar, backing vocals, keyboards; Nikk Dibs – bass, backing vocals, keyboards; Chris Warner – drums	
July 2018 – May 2019	Edsel Dope – lead vocals, rhythm guitar, programming, keyboards; Virus – lead guitar, backing vocals, keyboards; Chris Warner – drums; Acey Slade – bass, backing vocals	
May 2019 – February 2023	Edsel Dope – lead vocals, rhythm guitar, programming, keyboards; Virus – lead guitar, backing vocals, keyboards; Acey Slade – bass, backing vocals; Daniel Fox – drums	Blood Money Part Zer0 (2023)
February – April 2023	Edsel Dope – lead vocals, rhythm guitar, programming, keyboards; Acey Slade – lead guitar, backing vocals; Daniel Fox – bass; Chris Warner – drums	
September – November 2023	Edsel Dope – lead vocals, rhythm guitar, programming, keyboards; Daniel Fox – bass; Chris Warner – drums; Virus – lead guitar, backing vocals, keyboards	
February 2024 – present	Edsel Dope – lead vocals, rhythm guitar, programming, keyboards; Daniel Fox – bass (select shows), drums (select shows); Chris Warner – drums (select shows); Virus – lead guitar, backing vocals, keyboards (select shows); Acey Slade – lead guitar, bass, backing vocals (select shows)	
