= Dope discography =

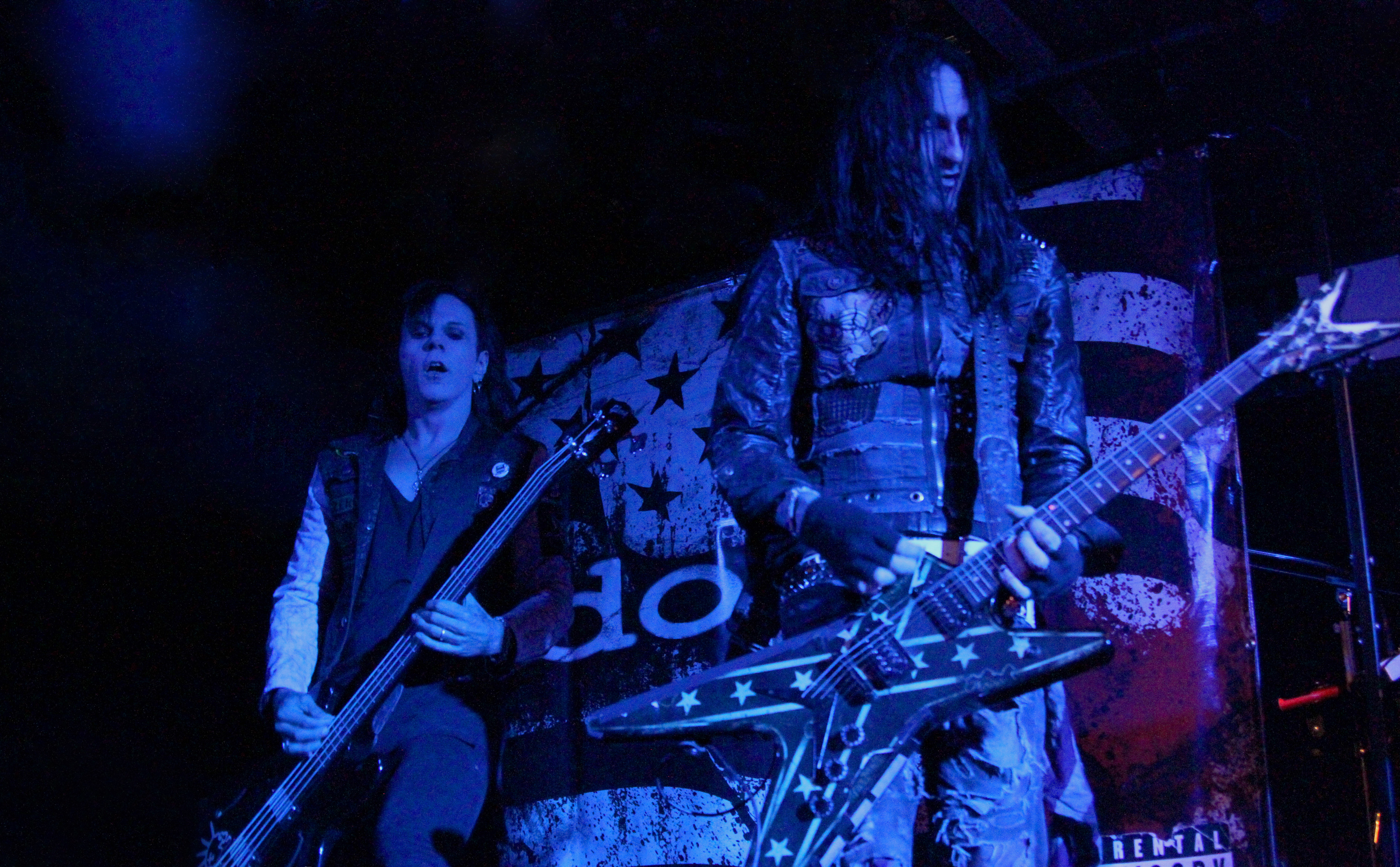
- Dope in 2015
- Studio albums: 7
- Live albums: 1
- Compilation albums: 3
- Singles: 27
- Music videos: 27

American industrial metal band Dope has released seven studio albums, one compilation album, and 20 singles. The band released its first two studio albums on record label Epic Records, the next two on Artemis Records, and their most recent album on Koch Records. The band's songs have appeared in movies, TV shows, and video games. A song from their first album, Felons and Revolutionaries, appeared in the movie The Fast and the Furious. They also recorded WWE chairman Vince McMahon's theme song, "No Chance in Hell". Five songs from American Apathy feature in the video game MTX Mototrax. Their song "Nothing for Me Here", from their album No Regrets, is featured in the video game Guitar Hero III: Legends of Rock.

== Albums ==
=== Studio albums ===
Year	Album details	Peak chart positions					Sales
Year	Album details	US	US Heat.	US Ind.	US Hard Rock	US Rock	Sales
1999	Felons and Revolutionaries: Released: September 14, 1999; Label: Epic; Formats: CD, CS, DI, streaming	—	25	—	—	—	US: 236,000
2001	Life: Released: November 6, 2001; Label: Epic; Formats: CD, DI, streaming	180	6	—	—	—	US: 73,000
2003	Group Therapy: Released: October 21, 2003; Label: Artemis; Formats: CD, DI, streaming	—	16	17	—	—	US: 50,000
2005	American Apathy: Released: July 26, 2005; Label: Artemis; Formats: CD, LP, DI, streaming	128	1	14	—	—	US: 100,000
2009	No Regrets: Released: March 10, 2009; Label: Koch; Formats: CD, DI, streaming	88	—	7	11	—	US: 60,000
2016	Blood Money Part 1: Released: October 28, 2016; Label: eOne Music; Formats: CD, DI, LP, streaming	27	—	2	3	3	US: 20,000
2023	Blood Money Part Zer0: Released: February 24, 2023; Label: eOne Music; Formats: CD, DI, streaming	—	—	—	—	—	
"—" denotes a release that did not chart.

=== Compilation albums ===
Year	Album details
2002	Felons for Life: Released: October 2002; Label: Eat Me/Sue Me; Format: CD
2017	The Early Years - New York City 1997/1998: Released: December 1, 2017; Label: Cleopatra; Format: CD, DI, Streaming
2019	Live & Rare: Released: 2019; Label: Cleopatra; Format: LP

=== Live albums ===
Year	Album details
2016	Live from Moscow Russia: Released: 2016; Label: self-released; Format: CD, DI, Streaming

== Singles ==
Year	Title	Peak chart positions		Certifications	Album
Year	Title	US Active Rock	US Main.	Certifications	Album
1999	"Debonaire"	38	—		Felons and Revolutionaries
1999	"Sick"	—	—		Felons and Revolutionaries
1999	"Pig Society"	—	—		Felons and Revolutionaries
2000	"Everything Sucks"	—	—		Felons and Revolutionaries
2000	"You Spin Me Round (Like a Record)" (Dead or Alive cover)	30	37		Felons and Revolutionaries
2001	"Die MF Die"	—	—	RIAA: Gold	Life
2001	"Now or Never"	23	28		Life
2002	"Slipping Away"	31	29		Life
2003	"Bitch"	—	—		Group Therapy
2003	"I Am"	—	—		Group Therapy
2003	"Rebel Yell" (Billy Idol cover)	—	—		Non-album single (later re-recorded as a bonus track on No Regrets)
2005	"Always"	37	38		American Apathy
2005	"People Are People" (Depeche Mode cover)	—	—		American Apathy
2009	"Addiction"	34	33		No Regrets
2014	"Selfish"	—	—		Blood Money Part 1
2016	"Blood Money"	—	—		Blood Money Part 1
2016	"Hold On"	—	—		Blood Money Part 1
2016	"1999"	—	—		Blood Money Part 1
2017	"Thieves" (Ministry cover)	—	—		Non-album single
2022	"No Respect"	—	—		Blood Money, Part Zer0
2022	"Believe"	—	—		Blood Money, Part Zer0
2022	"Fuck It Up"	—	—		Blood Money, Part Zer0
2022	"Best of Me"	—	—		Blood Money, Part Zer0
2023	"Misery"	—	—		Blood Money, Part Zer0
2023	"Dive"	—	—		Blood Money, Part Zer0
2023	"Parasite"	—	—		Blood Money, Part Zer0
2023	"Dead World"	—	—		Blood Money, Part Zer0
2023	"Lovesong" (The Cure cover)	—	—		Blood Money, Part Zer0
"—" denotes a release that did not chart.

== Other appearances ==
As with many industrial metal music stars, Edsel Dope has been involved with the supergroup Pigface. The following are some remixes of the Dope track "Bitch" that have featured on Pigface releases.

- Easy Listening... – (January 2003)

"Bitch (Mattress mix)"

- Head – (August 2003)

"Bitch (Defrag's Extraordinary Skipping Glitch mix)" and "Bitch (Passive/Aggressive remix)"

- Dubhead – (May 2004)

"Bitch (Bitch & Scratch)"

- Clubhead Nonstopmegamix #1 – (June 2004)

"Bitch (Where's My Bitch edit)"

- Pigface Presents Crackhead: The DJ? Acucrack Remix Album – (August 2004)

"Bitch (Own Your Own Edsel)"

- ''8 Bit Head: Complete Remix of Easy Listening + Other Stuff – (October 2004)

"Bitch (Defrag's Extraordinary Skipping Glitch mix)" and "Bitch Dance"

They also appeared on WWF Forceable Entry with the song "No Chance" and on Take A Bite Outta Rhyme with the song "New Jack Hustler".

== Music videos ==
Song	Year	Album
"Everything Sucks"	1999	Felons and Revolutionaries
"Debonaire (Live)"	1999	Felons and Revolutionaries
"Sick (Live)"	1999	Felons and Revolutionaries
"Now Or Never"	2001	Life
"Falling Away"	2003	Group Therapy
"Bitch"	2003	Group Therapy
"I Am"	2003	Group Therapy
"Motivation"	2003	Group Therapy
"Sing"	2003	Group Therapy
"Now Is The Time"	2003	Group Therapy
"Paranoia"	2003	Group Therapy
"Bring It On"	2003	Group Therapy
"Another Day Goes By"	2003	Group Therapy
"Today Is The Day"	2003	Group Therapy
"Burn"	2003	Group Therapy
"Easier"	2003	Group Therapy
"Survive"	2005	American Apathy
"6-6-Sick"	2009	No Regrets
"Addiction"	2009	No Regrets
"Selfish"	2014	Blood Money Part 1
"Blood Money"	2016	Blood Money Part 1
"Hold On"	2016	Blood Money Part 1
"Thieves"	2017	
"Believe"	2022	Blood Money Part Zer0
"No Respect"	2022	Blood Money Part Zer0
"Best of Me"	2022	Blood Money Part Zer0
"Misery"	2023	Blood Money Part Zer0
