= Virus (musician) =

American guitarist

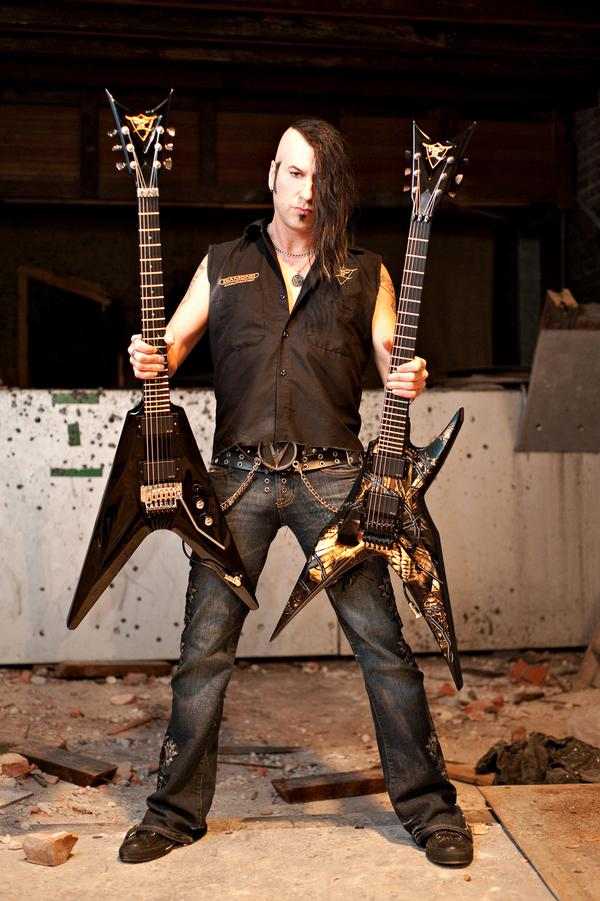
- Virus in 2009

Background information
- Born: Andre Michel Karkos; June 27, 1969 (age 57); Rochester, New York, U.S.
- Genres: Alternative rock; nu metal; hard rock; industrial metal
- Occupation: Musician
- Instrument: Guitar
- Years active: 1986–present
- Member of: Lords of Acid; Twisted Method; Verni; Dope
- Formerly of: Device

Andre Michel Karkos (born June 27, 1969), known professionally as Virus, is an American musician most recognized for playing lead guitar for the industrial metal band Dope. He is also known for his work with Device.

== Career ==
Growing up in Rochester, New York, Karkos started playing violin at the age of nine, but began to teach himself guitar when he discovered heavy metal at the age of 13. When he was 17, Karkos dropped out of his junior year of high school to teach guitar at the House of Guitars and was already playing clubs throughout upstate New York with his alternative rock band One, of which his younger brother Daniel Karkos was also a member.

One toured the Northeast club circuit in the early 1990s and then relocated to New York City. Virus started to focus on his songwriting/production career and session recording work. During this time, he toured extensively with artists he co-wrote albums with and produced several independent records for regional acts, including the One self-titled album on Sole Records in 1997. One also appeared on two compilation albums in the late 1990s. Making A Scene contained a live recording by the band in 1998 at the famous New York City venue Arlene's Grocery, and The Musician's Choice Vol.1 album was released by BMG in 1999 featuring Mötley Crüe and Sponge.

In the year 2000, Virus won the bass audition for the Brooklyn-based band Dope during the writing of their second album. When Tripp Eisen was fired from the group and joined industrial metal band Static-X, Virus replaced him on lead guitar, Acey Slade was moved up to the position of rhythm guitar, and Sloane Jentry (who had remained friends with the band) rejoined this time on bass. On drums, Preston Nash was replaced by Adrian Ost, and in 2001, Adrian was replaced by Racci Shay.

Dope released their second album Life in 2001 on Flip Records/Epic Records. The two singles from Life; "Now Or Never", which Virus co-wrote, and "Slipping Away" reached #28 and #29 on the Mainstream Rock charts respectively. The album itself reached #11 on the Billboard charts and #1 on the Top Heatseekers, which up until that point was the band's highest charting.

Disappointed with the label's perceived lack of promotion for the album, the band left Flip/Epic and joined Artemis Records, while also seeing the departure of Acey Slade in 2002. Virus began to contribute songwriting significantly to the band's founder and lead singer Edsel Dope for their third studio album titled Group Therapy, which was released in 2003 by Artemis Records. It was innovative in that it also featured a video for each song; meaning in total those who purchased the album received thirteen audio songs and videos. One song from that album, "Today is the Day" served as the official theme song for WWE's pay-per-view event No Mercy in October 2003. The songs "Falling Away", "Bitch", "Motivation", "Burn", and "So Low" were featured in the video game; MTX Mototrax, in both full and instrumental versions. In an effort to cut overhead and set up shop in their biggest market, Dope relocated to Chicago, Illinois. It was around this time that Virus began expanding his songwriting to corporate customers, with a company he started with Edsel called Evonix, by writing music for industry giants like Activision, Disney, MTV/VH-1, and ESPN out of his recording studio.

During the time when their fourth album American Apathy was being written, recorded, and released, Virus and Edsel began to pursue some rock side projects. In 2005, Virus wrote, performed, engineered, produced, manufactured, and released Black-N-Blues Vol.1, a dark-toned, all-acoustic collaboration between Virus and his younger brother Daniel. The music video for this album, "The Sale", featured Jerry Gaskill of King's X, and Hector Graziani of 40 Below Summer. That same year, Virus and Edsel joined Makeshift Romeo, which was originally formed by vocalist Derrick "Tripp" Tribbett, also known as Sinister of the VH-1 Daisy Of Love reality show, and bassist Derek DeSantis. The band released their 9-track self-titled EP on July 13, 2006.

In 2005, Dope released the album titled American Apathy, which Virus co-wrote and received credit for vocal production. Although released eight years after the band formed, four albums in and on an independent label, American Apathy performed well in the charts, debuting at #1 on the Billboard Top Heatseekers chart as well as #1 on the Billboard Independent Album chart; it was the band's highest charting to date.

After two years of touring, Dope returned to Chicago and began to write the follow-up album to American Apathy in 2007. Later that year, Guitar Hero III: Legends of Rock included a song by Dope called "Nothing for Me Here" on the bonus list and mentions that it will be on the band's upcoming album.

After Dope signed with Koch Records in 2008 for the band's fifth album, Virus relocated to New Hope, PA. Now being on the East Coast again, he was able to pursue new musical ventures in his old stomping ground, New York City. Using the name, Andre Virus Karkos, he won the Guitar 2 position for the monstrous Broadway musical Spider-Man: Turn Off the Dark, which all the music was written by U2. A proud moment for Virus, since he auditioned for The Edge via video and had to get his approval. When Reeve Carney signed on to take the lead role of Peter Parker, a deal was made to have Reeve's band to be hired as key musicians for the show, which led to Virus getting bumped by Zane Carney (Reeve's brother) for the chair of Guitar 2. To fill in the gaps between gigs, Virus started teaching guitar, bass, and song composition at the Paul Green School Of Rock Fort Washington, and also begged for more recording work. After rebuilding his studio in his new residence, he had his first client in Prong. Virus was asked to do a remix of the track "Looking For Them" for "Power of the Damn Mixxxer", the remix counterpart to Prong's 2007 album Power of the Damager. The CD was released on May 12, 2009, via 13th Planet Records.

No Regrets, which is co-written and co-produced by Virus, was released March 10, 2009. To coincide with the release, Dope joined the Black Label Bash tour with Black Label Society and Sevendust to promote the album from March 7 to May 17, 2009. The first video from the record featured a guest appearance by Zakk Wylde (Ozzy Osbourne, Black Label Society), who lent his signature guitar squeals to the song "Addiction". Continuing his desire to teach, Virus gave a tour and lecture to the School of Rock students during the Black Label Bash Tour about a typical day on the tour: loading into the venue, setting up the stage, maintaining gear, and even let the kids play his and Zakk Wylde's guitars.

Heading into the summer, the release of their second single "Rebel Yell" should be in full swing while Dope joins Mudvayne, Black Label Society, Static-X, Suicide Silence, and Bury Your Dead for the Pedal To The Metal Tour. Also during this tour, E1 Records band Dirge Within released Force Fed Lies, their debut album January 9, 2009, which contains a guest guitar solo from Virus on the song "Complacency".

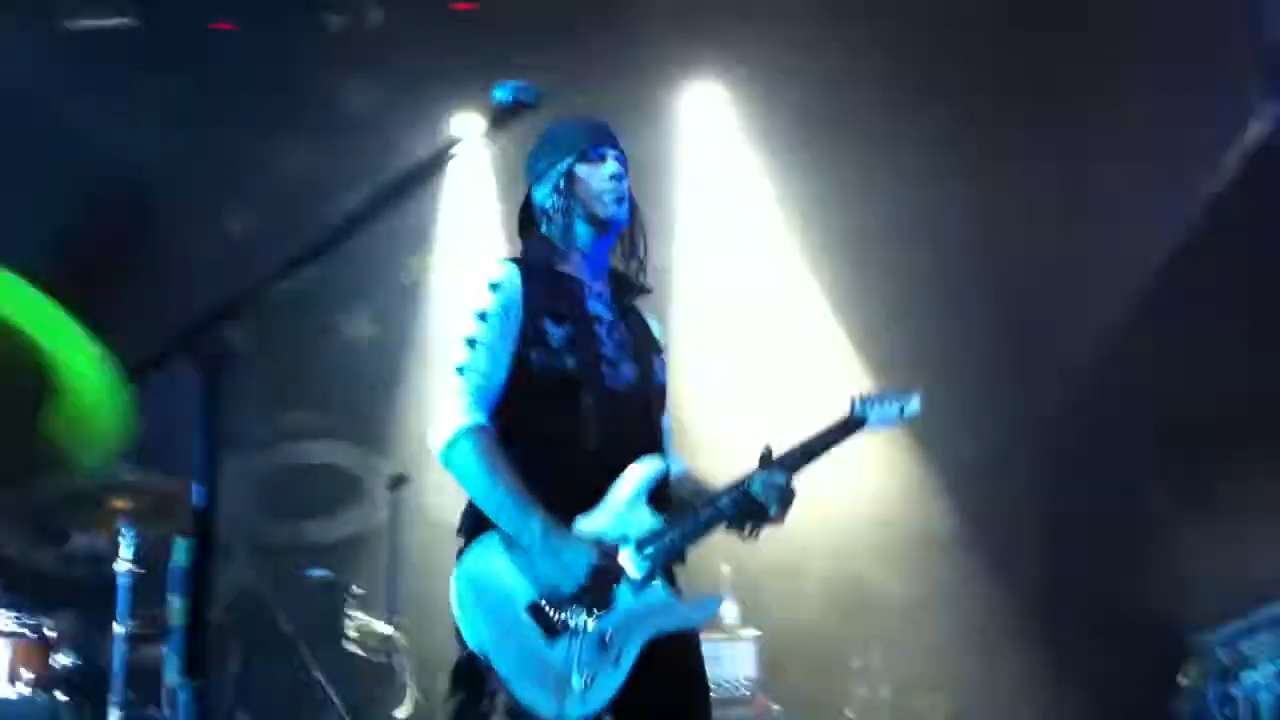
Virus with Dope in 2013

Looking for more work in 2010, Virus was asked to play guitar by his longtime friend and bandmate Tripp, who is now playing shows as Sinister (VH-1 Daisy of Love). In June, Virus was asked to play with American Idol finalist and Tony Award-nominated Rock of Ages vocalist Constantine Maroulis to perform shows called "A Night at the Rock Show" around the New York, New Jersey, and Pennsylvania area. Being the lead guitarist for Constantine eventually led to Virus performing in the Broadway musical smash hit Rock of Ages himself; playing shows from July 2010 through the present on Broadway in New York City.

On January 13, 2011, the techno/industrial band Lords of Acid announced that Virus would be joining the band. He made his debut on the Sonic Angel Tour 2011. Virus also toured with Lisa Bouchelle, a singer/songwriter who was main support for Ted Nugent on his Summer of 2011, "I Still Believe Tour".

After hearing guitar tracks that Virus played for the album from up and coming country artist Bradley Gaskin, John Rich asked Virus to audition to play some shows with Big & Rich. He got the nod and made his debut at the prestigious festival Country Thunder in Phoenix, AZ on April 13, 2012.

On January 10, 2013, it was announced that Virus was a tour member of Device, an industrial metal band which includes David Draiman from Disturbed, and Will Hunt from Evanescence.

== Influences ==
Virus often talks about how George Lynch is his main guitar influence, also Eddie Van Halen, Warren DeMartini and The Edge. He also cites Neal Schon and Gary Richrath as very important in his guitar upbringing.

== Discography ==
- 2016: Dope, Blood Money E1 Records (guitars, bass, backing vocals, songwriter)
- 2013: Device, Device, Warner Bros. Records Inc. (guitars)
- 2012: (e)motion picture, The Worth of a Heart (single), independent (mastering)
- 2012: Bradley Gaskin, Bradley Gaskin, Columbia/BNA Records (guitars)
- 2012: 7 Deadly, Hellbound (single), Bieler Bros. Records (guitars, bass, keys, backing vocals, songwriter)
- 2009: His Mighty Robot, Black Season (engineer) (unreleased)
- 2009: Team Cybergeist, How to Destroy Something Beautiful, RB Records Japan (guitar solo on the song "The Dream")
- 2009: Dirge Within, Force Fed Lies, E1 Records/Koch Records (guitar solo on the song "Complacency")
- 2009: Prong, Power of the Damn Mixxxer, 13th Planet Records (remixer of the song "Looking for Them")
- 2009: Dope, No Regrets, E1 Records/Koch Records (guitars, bass, keys, backing vocals, songwriter, co-producer)
- 2008: Team Cybergeist, Rumors, Toxic Shock Records (guitar solo on the song "The Dream")
- 2005: Black-N-Blues, Black-N-Blues Vol. 1, Sole Records (guitars, bass, backing vocals, lead vocals, songwriter, mixer, producer)
- 2005: Dope, American Apathy, Artemis Records (guitars, bass, keys, backing vocals, songwriter, vocal producer)
- 2003: Dope, Group Therapy, Recon/Artemis Records (guitars, bass, keys, backing vocals, songwriter, vocal producer)
- 2001: Dope, Life, Flip/Epic Records (guitars, bass, keys, backing vocals, songwriter)
- 1999: One, The Musician's Choice Vol.1 Beyond/BMG Records (guitars, backing vocals, songwriter, mixer)
- 1998: One, Making a Scene (compilation), Temperamental Records (guitars, backing vocals, songwriter, co-mixer)
- 1998: Paul Lockwood, Positive, Endurance Records (guitars, bass, keys, backing vocals, songwriter, mixer, producer)
- 1998: Billy Populus, Walking Backwards, Populus Records (producer, mixer)
- 1997: Lisa St. Ann, Curiously Strong, Pax Records (guitars, backing vocals, songwriter, mixer, producer)
- 1997: One Self Titled, Sole Records (guitars, lead and backing vocals, songwriter, mixer, producer)
- 1995: Lisa St. Ann, Conversations from the Sidewalk, Pax Records (guitars, bass, backing vocals, percussion, songwriter, mixer, producer)
