= No Chance in Hell =

No Chance in Hell may refer to:

- "No Chance in Hell" a WWE song recorded by Dope
- Royal Rumble: No Chance in Hell, 1999 professional wrestling event
- I Am Somebody: No Chance in Hell, a 2008 film featuring Dominik García-Lorido
- No Chance in Hell, a 1960 novel by Marvin Albert as Nick Quarry

== See also ==
- A snowball's chance in hell, an idiom of improbability
