= Crossbreed (band) =

American metal band

- Origin: Clearwater, Florida, U.S.
- Genres: Industrial metal; nu metal; industrial rock; alternative metal; electro-industrial
- Years active: 1996–2010; 2021–present
- Labels: Driven Music Group; Artemis
- Members: James Rietz; Ian Hall; JakoB SiN; Keith Heisler; Julius Caesar Mendoza; Tamara Kemp
- Past members: Chris Nemzek; Corey Floyd; Kem Secksdiin; Jay Diesel; Travis Simpkins; Charlie Parker
- Website: crossbreedonline.com

Crossbreed is an American industrial metal band from Clearwater, Florida, formed in 1996. They were signed with Artemis Records before being dropped from the label in 2003. The band released two EPs and three full-length albums before disbanding in 2010. The band reformed in 2021, playing two "rebirth" shows that year. The new single "N.F.G." was released, along with a music video in December of 2022. "The Killer Inside" released on April 20th, 2023.

== History ==
=== Early years ===
Crossbreed was formed in 1996 as a four-man band consisting of James Rietz, Chris Nemzek, Charlie Parker & Travis Simpkins. A year later they added keyboardist Jason Troph who left in 1998 to front the Orlando-based band Irrational. He was replaced by Phil "Flip" Marquardt. Their self-produced album .01 was released in 1998 with only 1,000 copies made; the album featured a cover version of "Wicked Game" by Chris Isaak.

In 1999, Dan "DJ" Izzo (then under the moniker "D.J. Balistick") joined the band as their Turntablist/2nd Keyboardist. It was at this time that he began developing their stage show using black lights and glow paint, which helped bring the band to the attention of the music industry.

=== 2000–2005 ===
On April 29, 2000, Crossbreed played Tampa's 98Rock's radio festival, Livestock, where they met the girls from the band Kittie. They gave them a copy of their Babydoll EP, which found its way to the A & R Rep for Kittie's former label Artemis. Crossbreed was signed to Artemis by the end of the year and their debut album, Synthetic Division was released nationally on May 8, 2001. Their first single, "Underlined", debuted on MTV2 & MTVX. The video for that song was nominated for a Billboard Music Award. In the summer of 2001 they toured the U.S. and Canada with the German band Rammstein and did a short run with Static-X. Synthetic Division has sold to date a total of over 100,000 copies. In what would be a sign for the future, bassist Charlie Parker left the band after a show on April 20, 2002. Crossbreed then parted ways with their label in 2003 and after a show with Orgy on May 2, 2004, bassist Bishop, keyboardist "Flip", and drummer Simpkins left the band as well. Later that year, Izzo would also leave the band. James Rietz & Chris Nemzek chose to continue and re-form the band with new members.

=== 2005–2010 ===
With a new line-up and manager (Bill Aucoin, former manager of Kiss), Crossbreed spent their time writing new material and doing shows in Florida, including opening for Orgy, Mushroomhead, and Mindless Self Indulgence. On July 25, 2005, they released their self-produced EP New Slave Nation and toured the Midwest with Mushroomhead and Dope on the "Music for Freedom" Tour. The following spring, they went out with Nothingface and Silent Civilian for a brief time before dropping off the tour due to conflict. Since that time they have toured again with Mushroomhead as well as alone throughout the Eastern U.S.

As of May 14, 2008, it was noted on Subkulture's Myspace Blog that Kem Secksdiin (former touring bassist for Celldweller) was co-writing and performing numerous songs on the upcoming Crossbreed album.

In July 2008, Crossbreed opened up their own audio-visual recording studio. Dubbed "The Candy Factory", the studio was located in the warehouse district of Downtown Clearwater, Florida and served as the studio where Crossbreed's new record KE 101 was recorded.

In June 2008, Crossbreed signed with "Driven Music Group", the new label of ex-Korn guitarist, Brian "Head" Welch. According to the band's MySpace, KE 101 was scheduled to be released in late spring/early summer 2009 via Ryko distribution, but due to the company going under, they decided to sign with Crash Music, an affiliate of Driven Music Group. Due to this and several other issues, KE 101 was released on September 15, 2009.

Crossbreed played on December 17, 2010, at The State Theatre in St. Petersburg, Florida.

=== Hiatus and other projects ===
Frontman James Rietz released this statement on the band's hiatus:

"I will start out with nothing is official cause nothing stays gone, but, as of now, Crossbreed and its members will be moving on to other projects. We have had a great run, but after all these years, some of us have never had a chance to expand beyond Crossbreed. Personally, Chris and I (James) have been doing this group on paper for 14 years and have never had a chance to do anything else. As some of you might know, we have our studio which will be running as usual, but there has to be a point where some journeys end to begin new ones. Now, I’m not saying there will never be another Crossbreed show, I’m only saying that Crossbreed will no longer be the primary focus any longer for our members."

Members of Crossbreed James Rietz and Ian Hall teamed up with Tamara Kemp to form a band called "Shu-Tang". They released their first EP "Drink Til You're Hott" on March 1, 2011. In September 2012, they released a video for the song "Dance Like A Zombie".

Kem Secksdiin released solo album called [eMerGe-n-EvoLve] on January 12, 2010. The album features guest appearances from Crossbreed's singer James Breed on the song "Night (Replace The day)" and F@mu$ (aka Famus, also known for work with XXX Car Ride) for the song "rEZuRekdEAD".

=== 2021–present ===
Crossbreed reunited in 2021, featuring the return of long time vocalist James Rietz and Ian Hall (Keyboardist/Programmer/Vocalist), for a live performance on July 3, 2021, in Cleveland at The Odeon. They partnered up with long time friends Rick Thomas (of Mushroomhead/Ventana fame) and Dan Fox (of Dope/Ventana fame) to revive the band in an event dubbed the 'rebirth show', that also featured co-headliner Ventana.

== Members ==
=== Current members ===
- James "James Breed" Rietz – lead vocals (1996–present)
- Ian Hall – keyboards, programming, backing vocals (2005–present)

=== Touring members ===
- JaKob SiN – keyboards, programming, backing vocals (2023–present) percussion (2025–present)
- Keith Heisler – guitar (2025–present), bass (2024–2025)
- Julius Caeser Mendoza – drums (2024–present)
- Tamara Kemp – keyboards, percussion (2025–present)
- Daniel Cruz – bass (2026–present), percussion, vocals (2025)

=== Former members ===
- Chris Nemzek – guitar, programming (1996–2010)
- Charlie Parker – bass (1996–2002)
- Travis Simpkins – drums (1996–2004)
- Jason Tropf – keyboards (1997–1998; touring 2004)
- Phil "Flip" Marquardt – keyboards (1998–2004)
- Dan "DJ" Izzo – turntables, programming (1999–2005)
- Bishop – bass (2002–2004)
- Corey Floyd – bass (2004–2010; died 2021)
- Chris Morris – drums (2004–2006)
- Travis Inskeep – keyboards, programming (2004–2006)
- Angel Bartolotta – drums (2006, 2022–2024)
- Kem Secksdiin – keyboards (2006, 2007–2010)
- Mike Cais – drums (2007–2008)
- Jay Diesel – drums (2008–2010)
- Dan Fox – drums (2006–2007, touring 2021–2022)
- Rick "Stitch" Thomas – keyboards, programming (2021–2023; touring 2006)
- Justin Kalenits – guitar (2021–2022)
- Kriz D. K. – drums (2022)
- Dro "The Dro" Simoes – bass (2022–2023)
- Jason Knotek – bass (touring 2024)
- Joey Aceto – drums (touring 2024)
- Derek Obscura – bass (touring 2021–2022), guitars (touring 2024)
- Chris "Manicotty" Maniatis – guitar (touring 2024–2025), bass (touring 2024)
- Mikey Glassel – keyboards (touring 2025)
- Wade Harris – guitar, keyboards (touring 2026)
- Seven Dunbar – keyboards, drums, percussion, vocals (touring 2026)
- Jay Arkham – guitar (touring 2026)

=== Session members ===
- John Sustar – keyboards, guitar, drums (2022)
- Sally Bartolotta – bass (2022)
- Jay Schmidt – guitar (2022)

== Discography ==
=== Albums ===
- .01 (1998)
- Synthetic Division (2001)
- KE 101 (2009)

=== Demos ===
- 3-Track (Baby Doll) (1999)
- 5-Track (Blue Guy) (2000)

=== EPs ===
- 2Twenty2 (1998)
- New Slave Nation (2005)
