= Synthetic Division =

Studio album by Crossbreed
- Released: May 8, 2001
- Recorded: December 2000 – February 2001
- Genre: Nu metal, industrial metal
- Length: 46:16
- Label: Artemis
- Producer: Matt Chiaravalle

Crossbreed chronology
| Synthetic Division (2001) | KE 101 (2009) |

Professional ratings
Review scores
| Source | Rating |
|---|---|
| AllMusic | 2.5/5 stars |
| Sputnikmusic | 3.5/5 |

Synthetic Division is the debut album by Crossbreed. The album had three singles: "Underlined", "Seasons", and "Breathe".

== Production ==
The band recorded the album in New York, after Kittie passed along Crossbreed's demo tape to Artemis Records.

== Critical reception ==
The Washington Post called the album a "no-nonsense debut", writing that "it will get the system pulsing".

== Track listing ==
| No. | Title | Length |
|---|---|---|
| 1. | "Severed" | 4:45 |
| 2. | "Seasons" | 2:51 |
| 3. | "Underlined" | 4:22 |
| 4. | "Breathe" | 5:01 |
| 5. | "Pure Energy" | 4:08 |
| 6. | "Release Me" | 4:49 |
| 7. | "Machines" | 3:16 |
| 8. | "Painted Red" | 4:06 |
| 9. | "Stem" | 3:07 |
| 10. | "Concentrate" | 2:09 |
| 11. | "Regretful Times" | 2:41 |
| 12. | "Lost Soul" | 5:01 |
| Total length: | | 46:16 |

== Notes ==
- "Pure Energy" was written on Christmas Day 2000 when the band was in New York City recording the album and they were unable to spend the day with family.
- "Seasons," "Regretful Times," and "Lost Soul" are reworked versions of songs that previously appeared on the band's self-released album .01.
- One track cut from the album was a 7 and a half minute instrumental called "Synthetic Division."
