= Tripp Eisen =

American guitarist (born 1965)

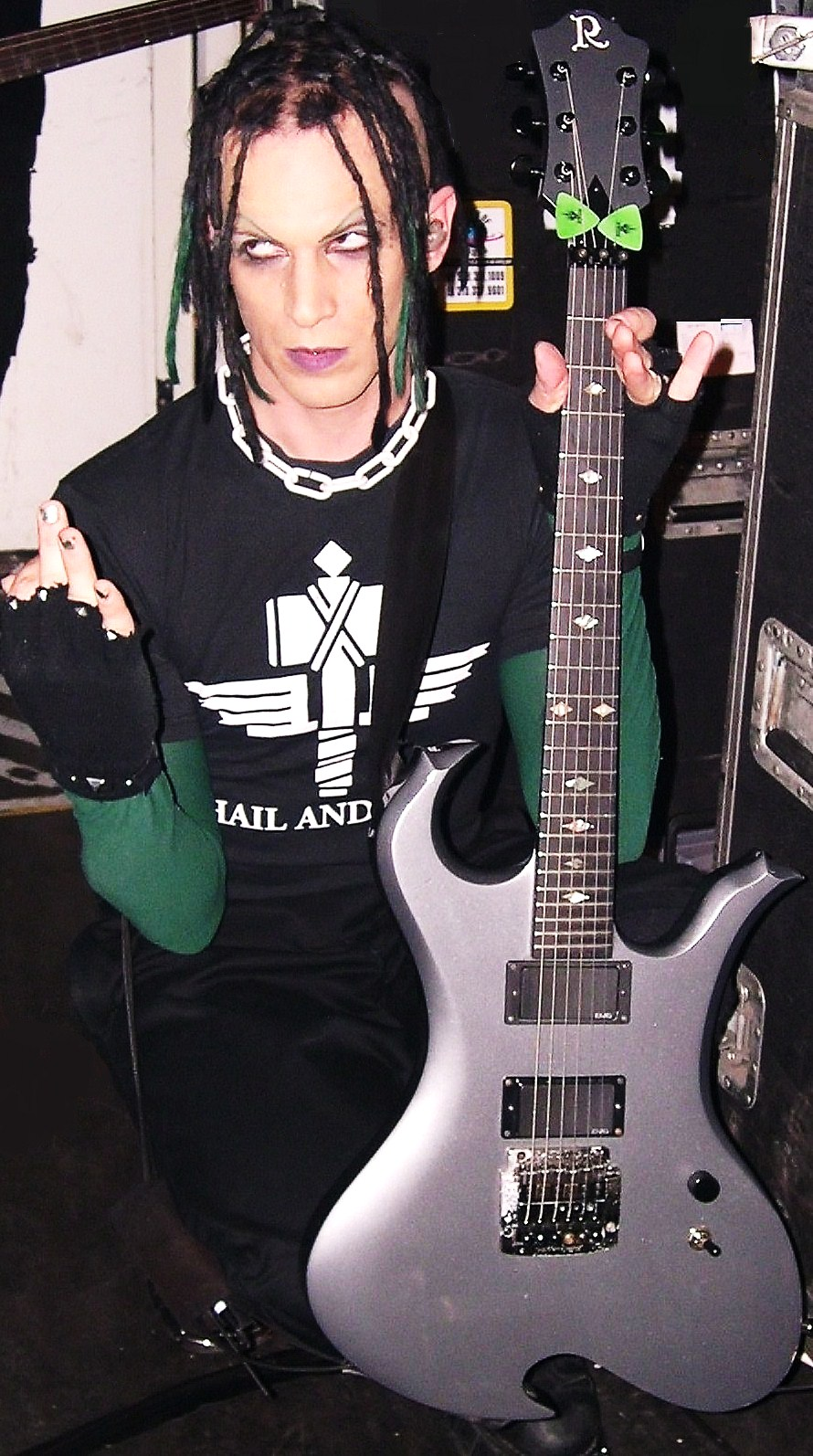
- Eisen in 2004

Background information
- Born: Tod Rex Salvador; June 29, 1965 (age 61); Pen Argyl, Pennsylvania, U.S.
- Genres: Industrial metal; nu metal; alternative metal; hard rock; horror punk
- Occupation: Musician
- Instruments: Guitar; bass
- Years active: 1986–1989; 1997–2005; 2016–present
- Member of: Face Without Fear; Roughhouse
- Formerly of: Static-X; Dope; Murderdolls

Tod Rex Salvador (born June 29, 1965), known professionally as Tripp Eisen, is an American musician best known as the former guitarist of industrial metal band Static-X. He is the current guitarist for the bands Face Without Fear and Roughhouse, and a former member of Dope and Murderdolls.

== Career ==
=== Dope (1997–2000) ===
Dope was formed in 1997, when Eisen met with brothers Edsel and Simon Dope. Eisen brought in friend Preston Nash to play drums, and the band worked the New York City club circuit. In 1998, Dope was signed to Flip/Sony records, and Eisen moved from bass guitar to lead guitar, bringing in Acey Slade—who had first referred Eisen to Dope a few years earlier—to play bass.

After the release of the album Felons and Revolutionaries (1999), the band toured extensively throughout the U.S. and Canada with acts such as Sevendust, Kid Rock, Static-X, Slipknot, Disturbed, Chevelle, Fear Factory, Staind, and Alice Cooper. During this time, Eisen met Wayne Static and Joey Jordison, with whom he would go on to collaborate. Eisen appeared in the Dope videos for "Debonaire", "Sick", and "Everything Sucks", and gained much notoriety from his wild antics and stage persona. He split with the band in late 2000.

The debut album sold in excess of 250,000 copies.

=== Murderdolls (1999–2002) ===
Originally formed by Joey Jordison under the name "the Rejects" in 1995, Eisen joined after meeting Jordison on tour in 1999. After touring as the Rejects until 2002, the band changed their name and released their debut Beyond the Valley of the Murderdolls under the name Murderdolls that same year. Eisen left the group in 2002 to be replaced by Dope bandmate Acey Slade, citing conflicts between touring plans and his work recording with Static-X.

=== Static-X (2000–2005) ===
Eisen joined the band Static-X in the year 2000, after the departure of guitarist Koichi Fukuda. He contributed to the recording of the albums Shadow Zone and Start a War.

Eisen has claimed that a number of the tracks on the 2020 Static-X album Project Regeneration Vol. 1 were co-written by him and Wayne Static. He went on to accuse the band of attempting to alter the compositions in order to deny him songwriting credits, and to say that a legal claim he made against the band was the reason for the album's delay. In a response to a query from a fan on Instagram, the band claimed that Eisen had no involvement in the production of the album beyond compositional credits from his time in the band.

=== Face Without Fear (2019) ===
In April 2019, Eisen announced a new project named Face Without Fear through a short promo video. The group features Ken "Mantis" Hoyt (Crushpile) on vocals, TJ Cooke (Methodical) on drums, Dante on rhythm guitar, and Nick Sledge on bass. The band released "Deliverance", their first single, in June 2019. FWF played their live debut in August at Newark's QXT, New Jersey, in August 2019. The band released their second single, "My Parasite", in March 2020 and performed their first livestream event in June 2020.

=== Roughhouse (2016-present) ===
Roughhouse is an American glam metal band founded as Teeze in 1983. The current members of the band are vocalist Luis Rivera, guitarists Tripp Eisen (known at the time as Rex Eisen) and Gregg Malack, bassist Dave Weakley, and drummer Mike Natalini. In 1991, the band broke up and reunited for some shows in 1992, 1993, and 2002.

On October 15, 2016, Roughhouse performed their first show in 14 years at the Whiskey Tango in Philadelphia, PA. This was followed with more shows in 2017 and an upcoming spot at the NY glam metal fest in Brooklyn, NY on June 27, 2026.

== Legal issues ==
While a member of Static-X, Eisen was arrested on February 10, 2005, on a felony charge of statutory sexual contact with a minor in Orange County, California. He was released on bail after only a few hours in custody. Just two weeks later, on February 24, 2005, Eisen was arrested by New Jersey detectives on a separate charge. He was ultimately convicted of the sexual offense of “luring with a motor vehicle" in the New Jersey case.

Upon hearing of the arrests, Static-X released a statement condemning the allegations and saying they had no idea Eisen might have been engaging in such conduct. They replaced Eisen with original guitarist Koichi Fukuda, who had quit the band in 2000.

On June 24, 2005, Eisen pleaded guilty to the charges in California and was sentenced to a year in state prison. He was released later that year and due for an October 7, 2005 arraignment in New Jersey on the February 24 charges.

On December 10, 2008, Eisen was arrested for parole violation in the California case. He was released on October 19, 2009.

On February 23, 2017, Eisen gave his first interview in more than a decade, to Totally Driven Radio. He spoke about his arrest and subsequent release from prison, saying both charges involved sexual contact with underage girls. Eisen said he had shown “Horrible judgment” and had “paid a price” for his behavior.

== Equipment ==
In 2004 to 2005, BC Rich guitars produced a Tripp Eisen signature model of their Wave guitar. It featured in Gun metal gray, with two BDSM closed humbuckers, his signature on the back of the headstock and the Static-X symbol inlaid 12th fret. In 2005 Epiphone produced a prototype ES-335 signature model, with EMG Pickups, locking nut, and no f-holes. The ES-335 was, however, never commercially manufactured. After Eisen's return to performing from 2017 he has continued using his B.C. Rich Wave guitar.

== Discography ==
Roughhouse

- Roughhouse (1988) – (guitar, backing vocals)

Dope

- Felons and Revolutionaries (1999) – (lead guitar, backing vocals)
- American Psycho: Music from the Controversial Motion Picture (2000) – (lead guitar, backing vocals)
- Scream 3: The Album (2000) – (lead guitar, backing vocals)
- Life (2001) - (additional guitars)
- The Fast and the Furious (2002) – (guitar, backing vocals)
- Felons for Life (2002) – (guitar, backing vocals)
- Dope – The Early Years – 1997/1998 (2017) – (bass, backing vocals)

Murderdolls

- Beyond the Valley of the Murderdolls (2002) – (select guitar solos, backing vocals)

Static-X

- The Family Values Tour 2001 (2001) – (guitar, backing vocals)
- Static-X: Chaos! Comics (2002) – (bonus DVD)
- Queen of the Damned Soundtrack (2002) – (guitar)
- Shadow Zone (2003) – (lead guitar)
- Static-X: X-Posed (2003) – (DVD)
- Texas Chainsaw Massacre Soundtrack (2003) – (lead guitar, backing vocals)
- Beneath... Between... Beyond... (2004) – (lead guitar)
- Static-X: X-Rated (2005) – (DVD)
- Start a War (2005) – (lead guitar)
- Static-X: Original Album Series (box set) (2008) – (guitar)
- Project Regeneration Vol. 1 (2020) (additional guitars & lyrics)
- Project Regeneration Vol. 2 (2024) (additional guitars & lyrics; uncredited)
