= American Apathy =

Studio album by Dope
- Released: July 26, 2005
- Genre: Nu metal; industrial metal
- Length: 48:25
- Label: Artemis
- Producer: Edsel Dope

Dope chronology
Group Therapy (2003)	American Apathy (2005)	No Regrets (2009)

Singles from American Apathy
- 1. "Always" Released: June 13, 2005; 2. "People Are People" Released: November 21, 2005

Professional ratings
Review scores
Source	Rating
Allmusic	2/5 stars
CDNow	3.5/5 stars
melodic.net	3.0/5 stars

American Apathy is the fourth studio album by American industrial metal band Dope. It was released July 26, 2005, through Artemis Records. It was the last album to feature drummer Racci Shay and also the band's last to be released through Artemis Records, who were merged with V2 Records North America the next year.

== Background ==
Dope's previous album, Group Therapy, was released through a partnership between Artemis Records and Recon Records. Edsel Dope would later express dissatisfaction at the marketing process for the band's last album, blaming poor sales on the label's owner making "a bunch of bad business decisions". Fortunately, Artemis Records willingly bought out Recon, providing the band with more control over money and promotion.

"Last time we were under two labels and now we just have one. We’re solely on Artemis now. Artemis bought the independent label that was started for the last Dope record. The guy that funded the label just wasn’t quite sure of how the music business worked. He was making a bunch of bad business decisions because he was handling the money. Danny Goldberg at Artemis stepped in and bought him out so Danny could have control of the band so we could do this record with him and put it out right. We’re looking forward to a nice long campaign in going out and promoting this record. The last record we only put out a year ago and man – here we are with a new record." Edsel Dope explaining the label changeup between Group Therapy and American Apathy.

== Production and Recording ==
The album was self-produced by lead vocalist Edsel Dope, who also handled most of the songwriting with guitarist Virus. Edsel Dope had also participated in the production, mixing and mastering of all previous Dope albums, but opted to handle the production himself, as it meant the band could continue to tour while recording the album. Most of the material recorded for the album was done in the band's tour bus, using studio equipment the band had acquired over the years in an effort to build their own studio with the intention of it to be mobile. When discussing the production style and aims of the record, Edsel stated:

"The whole idea of how we wanted to produce and record this album, was not to make a live album. But to make an album that makes this band feel live. It’s got that dirty, raw, groove oriented approach to the production. We wanted to make a record where we could call out any song on any given night and it would fit into our set list."

The album sound shows the band going back to a more aggressive style of music, incorporating more industrial metal and nu metal elements in a similar style to their previous album, Felons and Revolutionaries. Edsel Dope would comment that the band "spent a couple records experimenting and stretching the sound of what the band is. Now after making two albums and feeling very good about accomplishing that, we're very happy to meet ourselves back at the beginning again." Edsel would later describe American Apathy as a "sort of re-introduction and redefinition of what DOPE does best."

Edsel also incorporated elements of tongue-in-cheek humor in his lyrics, particularly on the tracks Sex Machine and I Wish I Was The President. He would later comment that he consciously wanted to let his sense of humor come out in both recordings and live shows, claiming that he previously fell for the common rookie mistake of taking himself too seriously.

Similar to their cover of You Spin Me Round (Like a Record) by Dead or Alive on the Felons and Revolutionaries album, American Apathy featured a cover version of People are People by English pop band Depeche Mode. The Life is a re-worked and re-recorded version of an old Dope song named City Tonight, which was originally written before the band's debut album. The City Tonight demo would later get a widespread release on Dope's The Early Years - New York City 1997/1998 compilation album in 2017.

== Release and touring ==
In 2004, to build anticipation for the upcoming album's release, the band headed out on the American Apathy tour from October 7 until December 21. Originally, Adema were intended to be the support act for the tour, but they ended up dropping out. Not wanting to let their fans down, the band sought out their contacts to secure support acts to fulfill whatever dates they could. In the end, the band received support from Mushroomhead, Motograter, Powerman 5000 and Twisted Method.

American Apathy was released on July 26, 2005 via Artemis Records. There were three different versions of the album available: The regular edition featured 14 tracks, the American Apathy: Reloaded edition came with an additional 9 bonus tracks, and the limited-edition version of American Apathy: Reloaded came with a bonus DVD featuring behind-the-scenes footage and a selection of music videos. The latter version was exclusive to Best Buy.

The album managed to sell 9,000 copies in its first week, peaking at number 1 on the Billboard Top Heatseekers chart, number 14 on the Billboard Independent Albums chart and number 128 on the Billboard 200.

In support of the album, the band went on the Music for FREEdom tour with co-headliners Mushroomhead. Industrial band Nocturne provided support for the entire tour, while Crossbreed and Pit Bull Daycare provided additional support on selected dates. The tour offered free admission for anyone with a valid military ID.

The album has since gone on to sell over 100,000 copies in the US.

== Reception ==
The album received mixed reviews upon release, with Johnny Loftus from Allmusic unfavorably comparing the album to "a strip club in the daytime." In a 4/10 review, Blabbermouth labelled the album "slightly better [compared to Group Therapy]", but ultimately claimed it was "difficult to take seriously." In a more positive review, The Metal Forge labelled the album as "their strongest to date", but also noted that some tracks felt like filler, specifically naming The Life.

== Track listing ==
All tracks by Edsel Dope and Virus except when noted.

1. "I'm Back" – 3:25 (Dope)
2. "Survive" – 3:12
3. "No Way Out" – 3:27
4. "Always" – 3:16
5. "Bastard" – 3:26
6. "Sex Machine" – 2:51 (Dope, Slade)
7. "Four More Years" – 0:17
8. "Revolution" – 3:39
9. "Let's Fuck" – 2:39
10. "Fuck the World" – 3:32 (Dope)
11. "I Wish I Was the President" – 4:05 (Dope)
12. "Dream" – 2:56 (Dope, Milner, Virus)
13. "The Life" – 5:08 (Dope)
14. "People Are People" (Depeche Mode cover) – 3:12 (Martin Gore)

=== American Apathy: Reloaded track listing ===
1. "Bitch" (Alternate Version) – 3:06
2. "Fuck tha Police" (2005 Studio Version) (N.W.A cover) – 3:48 (Dr. Dre, Ice Cube, MC Ren)
3. "Burn" (featuring the Detroit Hate Choir) – 3:16
4. "Debonaire" (Fuck Hollywood Mix) – 2:53
5. "Now Is the Time" (Alternate Version) – 2:56
6. "Motivation" (Alternate Version) – 2:55
7. "You Spin Me Round" (American Psycho Mix) (Dead or Alive cover) – 2:44
8. "Bring It On" (Fuck Tomorrow Mix) – 3:16
9. "Sick" (Bang You're Dead Mix) – 3:41
- Only rare initial pressings of the album included all of these bonus tracks onto the special edition version (which also included a Bonus DVD) of the album giving it a total of 23 tracks.
- In the edited version of the album, the track titles "Let's Fuck", "Fuck the World" and "Fuck tha Police" are changed to "Let's ****", "F.T.W." and "F.T.P." respectively.

=== Limited edition second disc ===
1. "Debonaire" (Fuck Hollywood Mix)
2. "Now Is the Time" (Alternate Version)
3. "Motivation" (Alternate Version)
4. "You Spin Me Round" (American Psycho Mix)
5. "Bring It On" (Fuck Tomorrow Mix)
6. "Sick" (Bang You're Dead Mix)

The bonus disc only includes newer pressings of the release.

== Personnel ==
Dope

- Edsel Dope – lead and backing vocals, rhythm guitar, bass, keyboards, programming, samples
- Virus – lead guitar, bass, backing vocals, keyboards
- Brix Milner – bass
- Racci Shay – drums

Additional personnel

- Detroit Hate Choir – performance

Production

- Chip Quigley – executive production
- Edsel Dope – production, engineering, mixing
- Virus – engineering, vocal production
- Ted Jensen – mastering
- Stephen Jensen – art conception, art direction, design
- Dan Machnik – photography
- Shawn Nowotnik – assistant
- Ron Ransom – illustrations
- Joey Stumpo – mixing assistant

== Chart positions ==
Album

Chart (2005)	Peak position
The Billboard 200	128
Top Heatseekers	1
Top Independent Albums	14

Singles

Song	Chart (2005)	Peak position
"Always"	Hot Mainstream Rock Tracks	38
