= Roughhouse (band) =

American glam metal band

- Cover art of the band's self-titled album

Background information
- Also known as: Teeze
- Origin: Lansdale, Pennsylvania, U.S.
- Genres: Glam metal, hard rock
- Years active: 1983-1991 (reunions: 1992, 1993, 2002, 2016, 2017)

Roughhouse is an American glam metal band founded as Teeze in 1983.

Their name was changed to Roughhouse in 1988 following line-up and image changes after signing with Columbia Records, although the reason for the name change itself was reportedly for "legal reasons". Max Norman produced their 1988 self-titled album. The members of the band are vocalist Luis Rivera, guitarists Tripp Eisen (known at the time as Rex Eisen) and Gregg Malack, bassist Dave Weakley, and drummer Mike Natalini. In 1991, the band broke up and reunited for some shows in 1992, 1993 and 2002.

On October 15, 2016, Roughhouse performed their first show in 14 years at the Whiskey Tango in Philadelphia. This was followed with more shows in 2017.

== Members ==
=== Teeze ===
==== 1983–1986 ====
- Luis Rivera – lead vocals
- Gregg Malack – rhythm guitar, backing vocals
- Dave Weakley – bass, lead vocals
- Brian Stover – lead guitar, backing vocals
- Kevin Stover – drums, backing vocals

==== 1986–1988 ====
- Luis Rivera – lead vocals
- Gregg Malack – rhythm guitar, backing vocals
- Dave Weakley – bass, co-lead vocals
- Rex Eisen – lead guitar, backing vocals
- Mike Natalini – drums, backing vocals

=== Roughhouse ===
==== 1988–1989 ====
- Luis Rivera – lead vocals
- Gregg Malack – rhythm guitar, backing vocals
- Dave Weakley – bass, co-lead vocals
- Rex Eisen – lead guitar, backing vocals
- Mike Natalini – drums, backing vocals

== Discography ==
- Teeze (1984, SMC Records)
- Teeze (1985, Greenworld Records)
- Roughhouse (1988, CBS Records International)
