= No Regrets (Dope album) =

Studio album by Dope
- Released: March 10, 2009
- Recorded: 2007–2008
- Studios: The Dope Factory, Chicago
- Genres: Industrial metal; nu metal; alternative metal
- Length: 47:21
- Label: eOne
- Producer: Edsel Dope

Dope chronology
American Apathy (2005)	No Regrets (2009)	Blood Money Part 1 (2016)

Professional ratings
Review scores
Source	Rating
AllMusic	(favorable)
Sea of Tranquility	4/5 stars

No Regrets is the fifth studio album by American industrial metal band Dope. The album was released on March 10, 2009. The album debuted at number 88 with 6,200 copies sold in its first week, making it the second highest-charted album in the band's history, even though American Apathy sold nearly 3,000 more copies during its first week of release. It remained Dope's highest charting album until Blood Money Part 1 peaked at number 27 in 2016.

== Track listing ==
All tracks are written by Edsel Dope.

Standard version
No.	Title	Writer(s)	Length
1.	"Flat Line"		0:38
2.	"6-6-Sick"		2:48
3.	"Addiction" (featuring Zakk Wylde)		2:43
4.	"No Regrets"		3:31
5.	"My Funeral"		3:32
6.	"We Are"		3:25
7.	"Dirty World"		3:00
8.	"Interlude"		0:08
9.	"Violence"		2:51
10.	"Best for Me"		3:21
11.	"Bloodless"		0:10
12.	"Scorn"		3:04
13.	"Rebel Yell" (Billy Idol cover)	Billy Idol; Steve Stevens	4:04
14.	"I Don't Give A..."		2:41
15.	"Die, Boom, Bang, Burn, Fuck" (Live medley consisting of parts from the songs: "Die MF Die", "I'm Back", "Sick", "Burn" and "Fuck tha Police")		8:26
16.	"Nothing for Me Here"		3:02
Total length:			47:24

Bonus tracks
No.	Title	Writer(s)	Length
17.	"High" (Jimmie's Chicken Shack cover)	Jimi Haha; Jim McD; Jim Chaney; Che Lemon	2:54
18.	"Para Fuckin Oia" (featuring Jimi Haha)		2:50
19.	"No Way Out (Black Heart Mix)"		3:45
20.	"Bitch (Black Heart Mix)"		3:06
Total length:			59:59

== In popular media ==
- The song "Nothing for Me Here" is featured in the video game Guitar Hero III: Legends of Rock as a bonus track, therefore making the song's original release date in 2007, two years before No Regrets was released.

== Chart positions ==
Album

Chart (2009)	Peak position
The Billboard 200	88
Hard Rock Albums	11
Independent Albums	7

Singles

Song	Chart (2009)	Peak position
"Addiction"	Hot Mainstream Rock Tracks	33

== Personnel ==
Dope

- Edsel Dope – lead vocals, backing vocals, rhythm guitar, bass, drums, keyboards, programming, sampling
- Virus – lead guitar, bass, backing vocals, keyboards
- Derrick "Tripp" Tribbett – bass, backing vocals
- Angel Bartolotta – drums

Additional personnel

- Zakk Wylde – guitar solo on "Addiction"

Production

- Edsel Dope – production, executive production, art conception, audio production, engineering, mixing
- Virus – engineering, production
- Tadpole – audio engineering, mixing, production
- Angel Bartolotta – editing
- Molly Hankins – management
- Stephen Jensen – art conception, art direction, design, photography
- Patrick Szczypinski – assistant
- Pete "Shakes" Szczypinski – editing
- Ted Jensen – mastering
- Bob Ringe – management
