= Group Therapy (Dope album) =

Studio album by Dope
- Released: October 21, 2003
- Genre: Alternative metal; industrial metal; nu metal
- Length: 39:25
- Label: Artemis; Recon
- Producer: Edsel Dope

Dope chronology
Life (2001)	Group Therapy (2003)	American Apathy (2005)

Singles from Group Therapy
- 1. "I Am" Released: September 22, 2003; 2. "Bitch" Released: 2003

Group Therapy is the third studio album by American industrial metal band Dope. The enhanced portion of the album contains a music video for each song. Group Therapy shows the band expanding on the more alternative metal style music the band had started on their previous album, Life, and most of the industrial style music has been toned down. The album contains some of the band's most heavy and aggressive songs while certain songs such as "Sing", "Another Day Goes By" and "Easier" show a softer, more melodic sound. In the second half of 2004 the album had already sold about 37,749 in United States. "Now is the Time" was used in an episode of Dog the Bounty Hunter, while "Today is the Day" was the theme for WWE's No Mercy event in October 2003

== Critical reception ==
Professional ratings
Review scores
Source	Rating
AllMusic	2.5/5 stars
CDNow	4.5/5 stars
Melodic	2.5/5 stars

Group Therapy garnered mixed reviews from music critics. Magnus Altkula of Sputnikmusic praised the album's production quality and instrumentation work for being improvements over previous records with Dope's inspirational lyricism, saying that "[T]he band has matured a lot but still have room to grow and I hope that one day they land a real masterpiece." Kaj Roth of Melodic commended the band's industrial direction with newfound musicianship but felt that it lacked memorable tracks that other bands like Orgy and Godhead had, calling it "An okay record, no more!" Johnny Loftus of AllMusic found the album better than 2001's Life but felt that Edsel Dope's take on the nu-metal formula was too reminiscent of Korn and Linkin Park with insincere introspection, concluding that "Dope has focused its fiery attack on Group Therapy, and that should at least get the pit roiling at shows. But Edsel's agenda is still riddled with cliché, and this fact robs the record of any lasting spark."

== Track listing ==
All music is composed by Edsel Dope, except where noted.

No.	Title	Length
1.	"Falling Away"	2:51
2.	"Bitch"	3:06
3.	"I Am" (Dope, Virus)	3:04
4.	"Motivation"	2:53
5.	"Sing" (Dope, Virus)	3:05
6.	"Now Is the Time" (Dope, Virus)	2:50
7.	"Paranoia"	2:41
8.	"Bring It On" (Dope, Virus)	3:14
9.	"Another Day Goes By" (Dope, Virus)	3:19
10.	"Today Is the Day"	2:55
11.	"Burn" (Dope, Virus)	3:06
12.	"Easier" (Dope, Virus)	2:58
13.	"So Low"	3:14
Total length:		39:25

== Personnel ==
Credits adapted from AllMusic.

Dope

- Edsel Dope – lead and backing vocals, rhythm guitar, bass, drums, keyboards, programming, sampling
- Virus – lead guitar, keyboards, backing vocals
- Sloane "Mosey" Jentry – bass, backing vocals
- Racci "Sketchy" Shay – drums

Additional personnel

- Heather Thompson – backing vocals

Production

- Edsel Dope – production, A&R, arrangements, art conception, audio engineering, audio production, composition, direction, engineering
- Stephen Franciosa – editing
- Mike Graham – photography
- Ted Jensen – mastering
- Jay Baumgardner – mixing
- Joe Morena – editing
- Shawn Nowotnik – assistant
- Chip Quigley – A&R
- Daniel Wyatt – A&R

== Charts ==
Chart (2003)	Peak position
Top Heatseekers	16
Top Independent Albums	17
