= Bradley Gaskin =

American country music singer-songwriter

- Born: Gadsden, Alabama, U.S.
- Genres: Country
- Occupation: Singer-songwriter
- Instrument: Vocals
- Years active: 2011–present
- Labels: BNA, Columbia

Bradley Gaskin is an American country music singer-songwriter. He signed with Columbia Nashville in 2011 and has released his debut single, "Mr. Bartender" after being discovered through a talent contest sponsored by John Rich of Big & Rich. The song entered the Hot Country Songs charts at number 51 on the chart dated for the week ending April 2, 2011. He made his Grand Ole Opry debut on August 20, 2011.

== Discography ==
=== Albums ===
Title	Details
Unfinished Business	Release date: April 4, 2025; Label: 30a Life

=== Extended plays ===
Title	Details
Bradley Gaskin	Release date: April 10, 2012; Label: Columbia Nashville

=== Singles ===
Year	Single	Peak positions	Album
Year	Single	US Country	Album
2011	"Mr. Bartender"	32	Bradley Gaskin
2024	"Accidentally Drunk"	–	single
2026	"'Bout Damn Did"	–	Unfinished Business

=== Music videos ===
Year	Video	Director
2011	"Mr. Bartender" (acoustic)	David Bean
2011	"Mr. Bartender"	Ryan Hamblin
