= Preston Nash =

American drummer

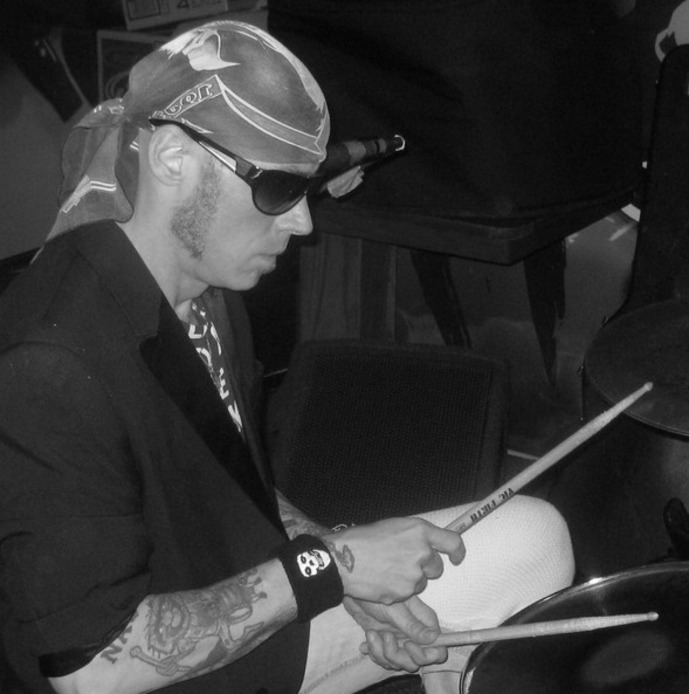

Preston Nash is an American musician, drummer, music educator, composer/songwriter, music producer, and former radio personality and producer. Prior to working with established artists, Nash gigged heavily, including shows at CBGB and throughout Canada and Europe. He is best known as the drummer for Dope, Primer 55, Society 1, Voodoo Rockfish, and The Color Red . He is also known as the former producer for The Ralph Bailey Show on 1560 KNZR out of Bakersfield, California. As a songwriter and composer, he's written music used in independent films, jingles heard on radio stations around the United States, and has collaborated and recorded with artists including Virus, Billie Stevens, and cellist Tina Guo.

Nash is a music educator and drum instructor for over 20 years, and holds 3 degrees in music, including a Master's Degree in Music Theory/Composition. In 2011 he moved to Indianapolis, where he's been a free-lance drummer, the lesson coordinator and a drum instructor at the Sam Ash Music Indianapolis Learning Center, and the director of Sam Ash Music's rock-group program called ASH ROCK. Preston Nash is endorsed by Pearl Drums, Sabian Cymbals, Pro-Mark Drumsticks, Evans Drumheads, PureSound Percussion, and Samick Guitars.

In 2025, Nash rejoined the reunited Primer 55. The reunion continued into 2026, including their own headlined Shattered Schemes, Broken Dreams Tour.

== Discography ==
- 1999: Felons and Revolutionaries – Dope
- 2001: (The) New Release - Primer 55
