= Life (Dope album) =

Studio album by Dope
- Released: November 6, 2001
- Recorded: 2001
- Studios: Pulse Recording (Los Angeles); The Dope Factory
- Genres: Nu metal; industrial metal
- Length: 45:36
- Labels: Epic; Flip
- Producers: Josh Abraham; Edsel Dope

Dope chronology
Felons and Revolutionaries (1999)	Life (2001)	Felons for Life (2002)

Singles from Life
- 1. "Now or Never" Released: September 17, 2001; 2. "Slipping Away" Released: 2002

Professional ratings
Review scores
Source	Rating
AllMusic	2/5 stars
Blender	1/5 stars
melodic.net	2.0/5 stars

Life (stylized LIFE) is the second studio album by American industrial metal band Dope. It was released on November 6, 2001 on Epic Records and Flip Records. Life has sold over 73,000 copies in the United States. The album's sound bears a resemblance to that of Marilyn Manson with nu metal elements. Life is Dope's final release through Epic and Flip, as the band severed their relationship with the companies after Epic Records' lack of promotion.

== Track listing ==
All tracks are written by Edsel Dope, except where noted.

No.	Title	Writer(s)	Length
1.	"Take Your Best Shot"		2:48
2.	"Now or Never"	Dope; Acey Slade; Virus	3:26
3.	"Nothing (Why)"		3:59
4.	"Stop"	Dope; Tripp Eisen	2:50
5.	"Thanks for Nothing"		2:50
6.	"Die MF Die"	Dope; Eisen	3:06
7.	"What About..."	Dope; Slade	3:23
8.	"Move It"	Dope; Slade	2:47
9.	"Jenny's Cryin'"		3:11
10.	"With or Without You"		3:36
11.	"Crazy"		3:05
12.	"Slipping Away"		3:02
13.	"March of Hope" (contains the hidden track "You're Full of Shit")		7:01
Total length:			45:36

== Credits ==
=== Dope ===
- Edsel Dope – lead vocals, additional guitar, bass, programming, producer, recording/engineering (1), digital editing, layout/design, design, artwork
- Simon Dope – keyboards, samplers, percussion, additional engineering (1)
- Acey Slade – rhythm guitar, backing vocals, additional engineering (1)
- Sloane "Mosey" Jentry – bass
- Racci "Sketchy" Shay – drums
- Virus – lead guitar, backing vocals

=== Other personnel ===
- DJ Lethal – turntables (4, 7, 13)
- Tripp Eisen – additional guitars (4, 6)
- Jordan Schur – executive producer and A&R
- Josh Abraham – producer, recording/engineering (2–13)
- Anthony "Fu" Valcic – recording/engineering (2–13)
- Kevin Strauwen (Strowen on album) – assistant engineer
- Andy Wallace – mixing
- Steve Sisco – mix down engineer
- Vlado Meller – mastering
- Chip Quigley – management and direction
- Kaz Utsunomiya – A&R for Epic
- Lia Sweet – business affairs
- Joe Serling – legal representation
- John Ditmar – booking
- Chapman Baehler – photography
- Hans Fahrmeyer – photography
- Gene Ambo – photography
- Sara Bowers – layout and design
- Lori Jensen – cover inspiration
- Ron Ransom – artwork
- Dink – artwork
- Darcy J.Watt – artwork
- Darcy Vorhees – artwork
- Jenny Dots – artwork
- Darrin Moore – artwork
- OzZMUDD – artwork

== Chart positions ==
Album

Chart (2001)	Peak position
The Billboard 200	180
Top Heatseekers	6

Singles

Year	Song	US Main.
2001	"Now or Never"	28
2002	"Slipping Away"	29
