= Blood Money Part 1 =

Studio album by Dope
- Released: October 28, 2016
- Genre: Industrial metal; metalcore; alternative metal
- Length: 48:37
- Label: eOne
- Producer: Edsel Dope

Dope chronology
No Regrets (2009)	Blood Money Part 1 (2016)	Blood Money Part Zer0 (2023)

Singles from Blood Money Part 1
- 1. "Selfish" Released: August 26, 2014; 2. "Blood Money" Released: July 15, 2016; 3. "Hold On" Released: August 16, 2016; 4. "1999" Released: 2016

Blood Money Part 1 is the sixth studio album by American industrial metal band Dope. The album was released on October 28, 2016 by eOne Music, seven years after No Regrets, making it the longest gap between studio albums. The album charted at number 27 on the Billboard 200, Dope's highest-charting position in the US, and stayed on the chart for two weeks. The songs "Selfish", "Blood Money" and "Hold On" were given music videos in respective orders. A prequel album entitled Blood Money Part Zer0 was released in 2023.

== Reception ==
Metal Hammer critic Sophie Maughan gave the record a positive review, writing: "Emotional soliloquies aside, the main allure comes in the form of pounding basslines (Drug Music), twisted beats (X-Hale), and underlying old-school sensibilities with 1999 sure to delight longtime fans and stir up the pits." Grim Lord of New Noise Magazine stated: "After all these years, very little has changed and I'm sure you'll be pleased with the final product."

== Track listing ==
No.	Title	Lyrics	Music	Length
1.	"Confessions of a Felon (Intro)"	Edsel Dope	Edsel Dope	0:10
2.	"Blood Money"	Edsel Dope	Edsel Dope, Matt Szlachta, Virus	4:32
3.	"Shouda Known Better"	Edsel Dope	Edsel Dope, Nikk Dibs	3:17
4.	"Lexipro"	Edsel Dope	Edsel Dope, Nikk Dibs	1:44
5.	"Hold On"	Edsel Dope	Edsel Dope, Matt Szlachta	3:26
6.	"1999"	Edsel Dope	Edsel Dope, Jordan Lee, Virus	3:42
7.	"Razorblade Butterfly"	Edsel Dope	Edsel Dope, Matt Szlachta, Virus	3:27
8.	"Drug Music"	Edsel Dope	Edsel Dope, Matt Szlachta, Nikk Dibs	4:08
9.	"A New Low"	Edsel Dope	DJ Nelson, Edsel Dope	3:37
10.	"Hypocrite"	Edsel Dope	Edsel Dope, Matt Szlachta, Nikk Dibs	3:12
11.	"X-Hale"	Edsel Dope	Edsel Dope, Matt Szlachta, Nikk Dibs	2:01
12.	"End of the World"	Edsel Dope	Edsel Dope, Matt Szlachta, Nikk Dibs	3:19
13.	"Selfish"	Edsel Dope	DJ Nelson, Edsel Dope	4:18
14.	"Numb"	Edsel Dope	Edsel Dope	4:04
15.	"Violet" (Hole cover/Bonus track)	Courtney Love, Eric Erlandson	Courtney Love, Eric Erlandson	3:40
Total length:				48:37

== Personnel ==
Dope

- Edsel Dope: performance (1, 4, 11), backing vocals (2, 5, 8, 9, 12–15), bass (2, 10, 13), drums (2, 3, 5–10, 12–15), guitars (2, 8, 9, 12–15), vocals (2, 3, 5–10, 12–15), programming (2, 5–10, 12–15)
- Virus: guitars (2, 6, 8, 10, 14, 15), backing vocals (8, 13, 14)
- Nikk Dibs: bass (2, 3, 5–10, 12–15), guitars (3, 5, 6, 8–10, 12, 15), programming (3, 5–10, 12–15), performance (4, 11), backing vocals (5, 8, 9, 15)

Other personnel

- Matt Szlachta: guitars (2, 5–8, 10, 12, 13)
- Jerms Jude: backing vocals (2)
- DJ Nelson: guitars (9, 13, 14), bass (13)
- Peter Szczypinski: backing vocals (15)
