= Acey Slade =

American musician

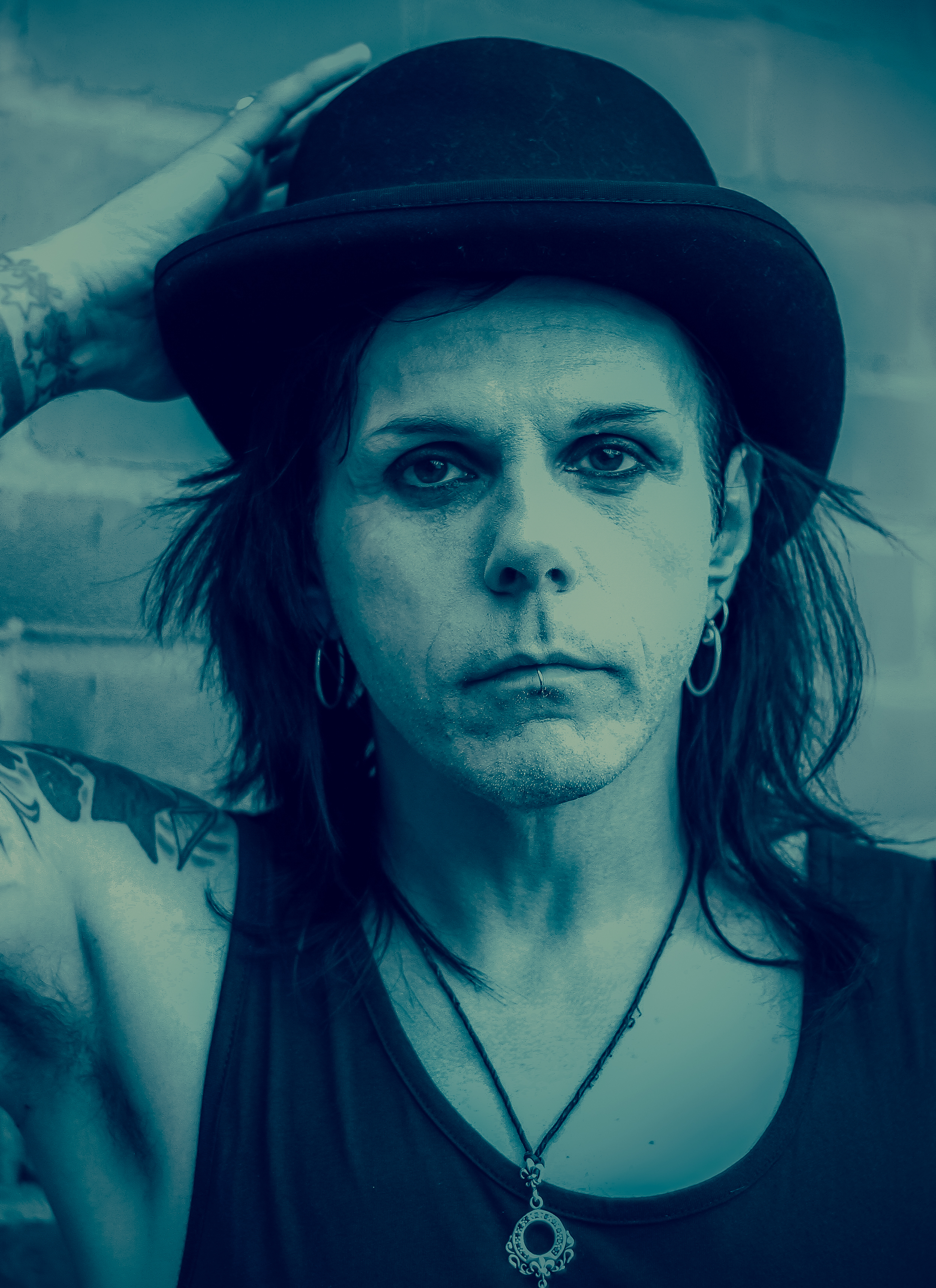
- Slade in 2015

Background information
- Born: Emil John Schmidt IV; Pennsylvania, U.S.
- Genres: Punk rock; hardcore punk; horror punk; hard rock; heavy metal
- Occupations: Musician; record producer
- Instruments: Guitar; bass; vocals
- Member of: Acey Slade; Misfits; Joan Jett and the Blackhearts; Acey Slade & the Dark Party; Trashlight Vision; Murderdolls; Dope; Billy Liar; Amen; Rachel Lorin; Vampire Love Dolls; Wednesday 13

Emil John Schmidt IV, known professionally as Acey Slade, is an American musician. He is the bassist and one of the guitarists in the industrial metal band Dope and a former guitarist of the horror punk and glam metal act Murderdolls. He is also the lead singer and guitarist of Acey Slade & the Dark Party and a touring guitarist of The Misfits. Previous to this, he served as the bassist in Joan Jett and the Blackhearts and as the lead vocalist and guitarist in the punk rock band Trashlight Vision, which broke up in 2007.

== Career ==
Schmidt was born in Pennsylvania. Prior to Murderdolls and Wednesday 13, Slade played bass, and later guitar, in Dope alongside guitarist Tripp Eisen who was also part of the Murderdolls. After Eisen left Dope, Slade was moved to guitar for the 2001 album Life. He later left Dope to join the Murderdolls, again replacing Eisen on guitar. Before joining the Murderdolls (alongside his Dope work), Slade also fronted a band known as the Vampire Love Dolls. After Murderdolls were put on hiatus in 2004, Slade filled in on guitar for punk/metal crossover band Amen for a tour of Japan.

Slade played rhythm guitar on the track "Tired 'n Lonely" on Roadrunner United for Roadrunner Records' 25-year anniversary. He collaborated on the song with Joey Jordison, who also played in the Murderdolls with Slade. After the breakup of TrashLight Vision, Slade filled in as guitarist for Wednesday 13 on his 2008 tour as well as taking time to produce records by His Mighty Robot (which remains unreleased) and Billy Liar.

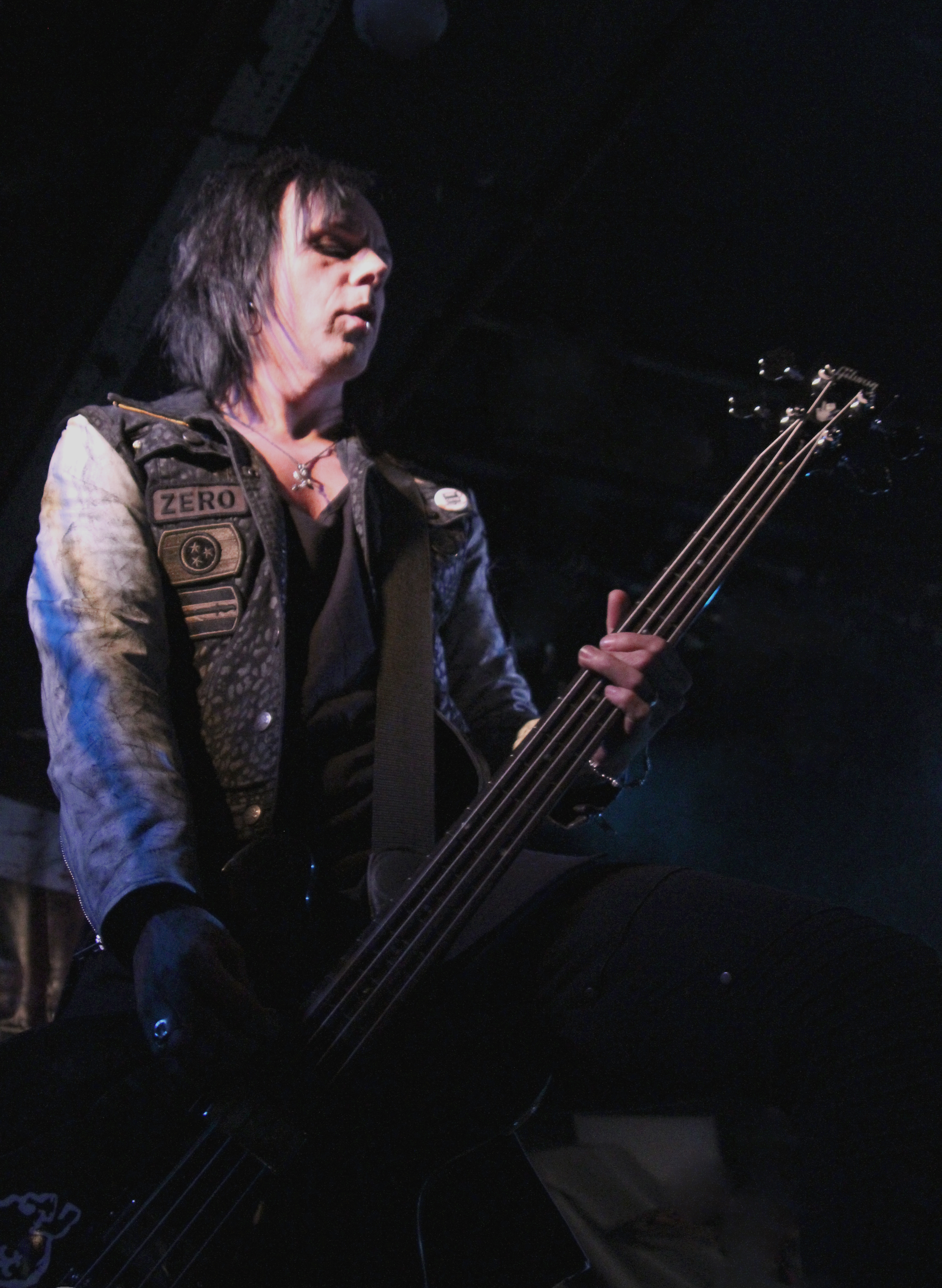
Slade performing in 2015

Slade is one of the contributors to the book Sex Tips from Rock Stars by Paul Miles published by Omnibus Press in July 2010 and was also used as the motion-capture model for the punk singer and rock guitarist characters on the video game Rock Band 2.

Slade is currently touring and promoting his new band Acey Slade & the Dark Party, whose début album The Dark Party was released in 2010, and is also playing bass with Joan Jett & the Blackhearts and filling in on bass for the occasional tour date with former band Dope. Slade performed second guitar for the various Original Misfits reunion sets.

In 2022, he joined the band of Rammstein frontman Till Lindemann for the "Ich hasse Kinder" tour.

== Personal life ==
Slade lives in Newark, New Jersey.

He also owns a coffee shop in Boonton, New Jersey, called Catfight Coffee.

== Equipment ==
=== Joan Jett & the Blackhearts ===
- ESP Phoenix II-B bass guitars
- Ampeg SVT-CL amps
- Ampeg SVT-810E cabinets
- Boss TU-2

=== Acey Slade & the Dark Party ===
- ESP Phoenix guitars
- ESP Eclipse-I guitars
- Peavey Penta amps
- Peavey Penta cabinets
- Boss TU-2

=== Other: In the past Slade has also used ===
- Black 35 "Ouija Board" custom guitar
- Gibson Les Paul guitars
- Dean ML with EMGs guitars
- Dean Modern with EMGs guitars
- Gibson Firebird guitars
- BC Rich Mockingbird guitars
- ESP Vintage-4 PJ bass guitars
- Epiphone Les Paul guitars
- Hughes & Kettner guitar amps
- Marshall guitar amps
- Tech 21 SansAmp
- Hagstrom Viking bass guitar

== Discography ==
- 1997: Vampire Love Dolls – Vampire Love Dolls (Vocals)
- 1999: Felons and Revolutionaries – Dope (Bass)
- 2001: Life – Dope (Guitar, backing vocals)
- 2004: TrashLight Vision EP – TrashLight Vision (Vocals, guitar)
- 2005: Allergic to Home EP – TrashLight Vision (Vocals, guitar)
- 2005: Roadrunner United – Roadrunner Records (Rhythm guitar on "Tired 'N Lonely")
- 2006: Alibis and Ammunition – TrashLight Vision (Vocals, guitar) †
- 2008: Sex, Murder, Art, Baby! EP – Acey Slade (Vocals, guitar, bass) †
- 2009: Black Season – His Mighty Robot (Unreleased) †
- 2009: It Starts Here EP – Billy Liar (Production, backing vocals, guitar) †
- 2009: She Brings Down the Moon EP – Acey Slade (Vocals, guitar, bass) †
- 2009: Use It EP – Black Sugar Transmission (Vocals on "I Dare You")
- 2010: The Dark Party – Acey Slade & the Dark Party (Vocals, guitar, bass) †
- 2010: The After Party EP – Acey Slade & the Dark Party (Vocals, guitar, bass) †
- 2010: Spin the Bottle EP – Acey Slade & the Dark Party (Vocals, guitar)
- 2011: Inside the Reptile House: Live from NYC – Acey Slade & the Dark Party (Vocals, guitar)
- 2012: Recognise – JD & the FDCs (Vocals on "The Secret")
- 2012: Suicide Lullaby/Burn This City Down – Acey Slade & the Dark Party (Vocals, guitar) - Split 7" with JD & the FDCs
- 2013: Unvarnished – Joan Jett & the Blackhearts (Bass)
- 2015: Valentines for Sick Minds – Acey Slade (Vocals, bass, guitar)
- 2016: Live from Moscow, Russia – Dope (bass, vocals)

† - Produced
