= Angel Bartolotta =

American drummer

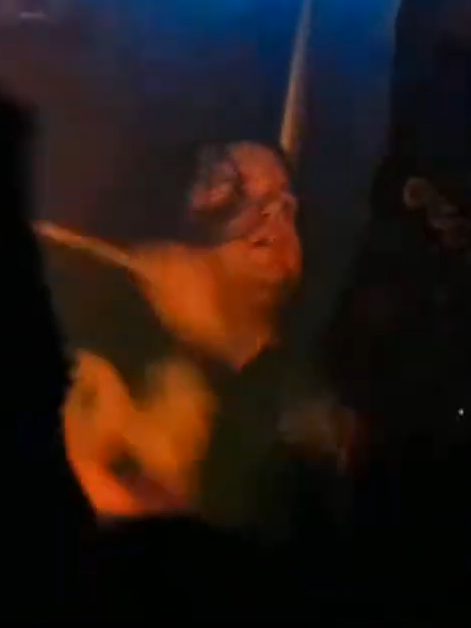
- Bartolotta with Dope in 2013

Background information
- Born: Andrew Bartolotta; November 26, 1981 (age 44); Morristown, New Jersey
- Genres: Alternative metal; industrial rock; heavy metal
- Occupations: musician; songwriter; drummer; teacher; author; music school founder
- Instrument: Drums
- Years active: 1996–present
- Labels: Metropolis; Corporate Punishment; Toxic Shock

Angel Bartolotta (born November 26, 1981) is an American drummer, teacher, and author. He is best known as the drummer for the band Dope (whose album “No Regrets” debuted at #88 on the Billboard 200, #11 on Billboard's Hard Rock Albums, and #7 on Billboard's Independent Albums), shock-rockers Genitorturers, industrial rock pioneers PIG, cyber-metal rockers Crossbreed, nu-metal heavyweights Switched, the iconic punk band The Undead (original members of the Misfits), as well as Rikets, Crooked, Grim Faeries, Gen-XX (electro project from Gen of Genitorturers), and many other bands. In 2016, Angel and his wife Sally opened The Rock Box Music School & Stage in North Port, Florida. Angel Bartolotta is an Artist on the DW Drums, PDP Drums, Zildjian Cymbals, Evans Drumheads, Vater Drumsticks, Westone Audio, SkyGel Damper Pads, and Orthopedic Drum Thrones rosters. www.angelbartolotta.com

== Band History ==
- Team Cybergeist (2006–present)
- Dope (2006–2013)
- Genitorturers (2001–2009, 2025)
- PIG (2006)
- Crossbreed (2006, 2022–2024)
- Switched (2006–2010)
- The Undead (2001)
- Rikets (2005)
- Crooked (2003)
- Gen-XX (2008–2012)
- Nicholas Barratt (2024) (Feature)

== See also ==
- KMFDM
