= Dope (band) =

American industrial metal band

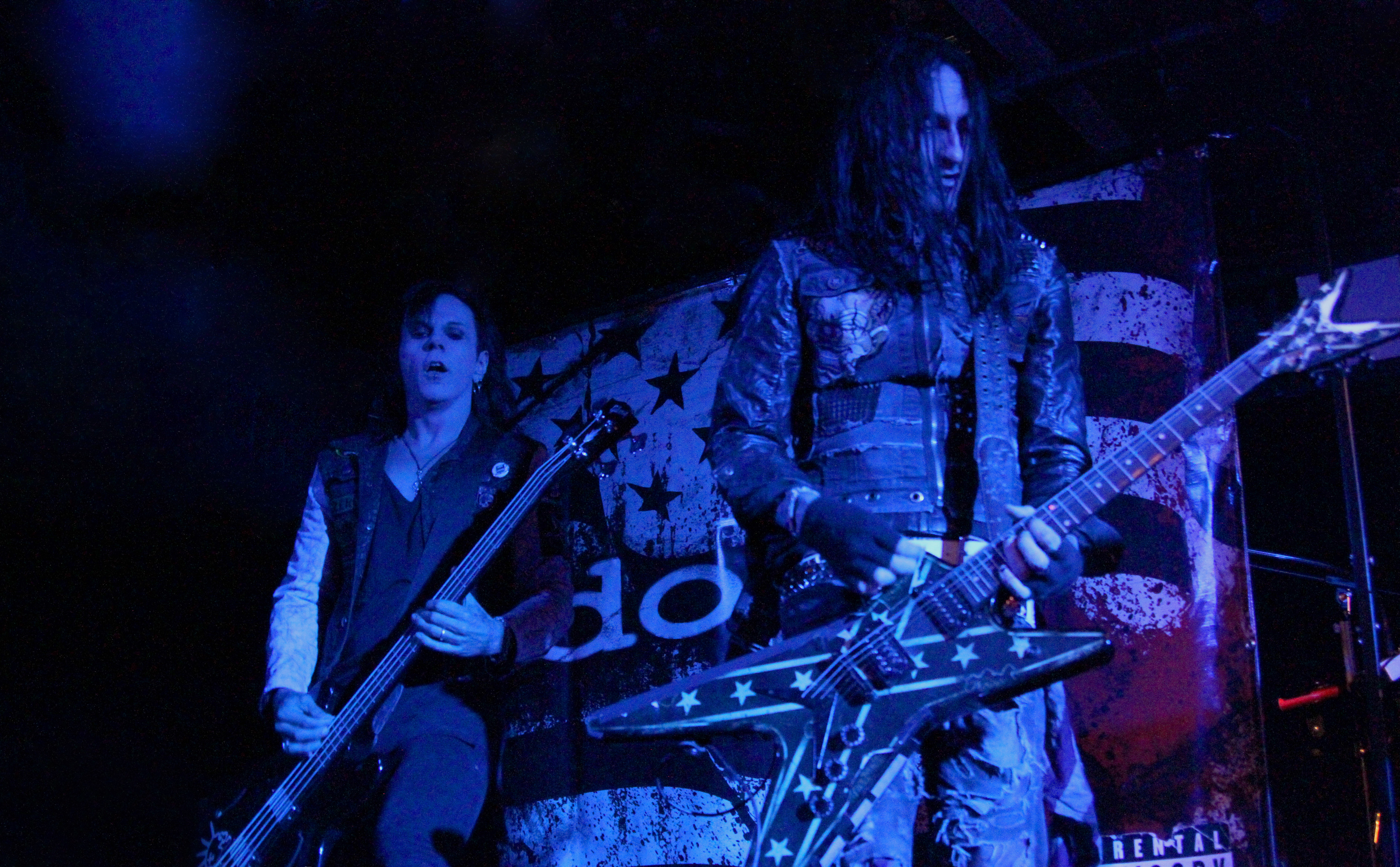
- Dope performing in 2015. L–R: Acey Slade and Edsel Dope

Background information
- Origin: New York City, U.S.
- Genres: Industrial metal; nu metal; alternative metal
- Years active: 1997–present
- Labels: Flip; Epic; Eat Me/Sue Me; Artemis; V2; eOne; EPOD
- Members: Edsel Dope; Acey Slade; Virus; Daniel Fox
- Past members: Simon Dope; Preston Nash; Tripp Eisen; Sloane "Mosey" Jentry; Racci "Sketchy" Shay; Brix Milner; Angel Bartolotta; Derrick Tribbett; Jerms Genske; Nikk Dibs
- Website: dopetheband.com

Dope is an American industrial metal band from New York City, formed in 1997. The band has released seven full-length studio albums with their most recent studio album, Blood Money Part Zer0, being released in February 2023. The lineup currently consists of founding member and lead singer, rhythm guitarist and keyboardist Edsel Dope, lead guitarist Virus, bassist Acey Slade, and drummer Daniel Fox. As of 2022, they have sold over one million albums worldwide.

== History ==
=== Early days (1997–1998) ===
The band was founded in 1997 by songwriter and lead vocalist Edsel Dope. As a child, Edsel and his brother Simon Dope were separated when their parents divorced. When the two were adults, they reunited and Simon joined Edsel's band, playing keyboards, samples and percussion. The pair then recruited Sloane Jentry as guitarist, Preston Nash as drummer, and Tripp Eisen as bassist.

Unlike many of the popular bands from the 1990s, Dope derived their sound from influences taken from heavy metal bands and fused that with the sound of industrial rock acts who had made waves earlier in the decade, such as Ministry and Skinny Puppy.

In their earliest days, the band sold drugs to survive and purchase instruments. Furthermore, the band name "Dope" refers to heroin, which was the common substance Edsel and Simon sold around the New York City area as shown by their early T-shirt designs, which prominently displayed hypodermic needles.

The band also had some early connections with fellow rockers Marilyn Manson; ex-drummer Ginger Fish shared an apartment with Edsel Dope in Las Vegas during the earlier 1990s, before either of them were in their respective bands. Also, guitarist Zim Zum allowed the band to claim that they were "currently being produced by Zim Zum" on the cover of their promotional discs to help them gain a record deal. It was originally planned that Zum would produce their debut. However, he was busy recording the album Mechanical Animals at the time. Lead singer Edsel has also maintained a good friendship with ex-Manson guitarist Daisy Berkowitz.

=== Felons and Revolutionaries (1999–2000) ===
Felons and Revolutionaries was created after performing on the New York City club circuit, and releasing several promotional cassettes the band was signed by Epic Records. For the album's recording, Sloane Jentry had left the band and Tripp Eisen moved to guitar, while Acey Slade was brought in on bass. The album featured fourteen tracks including two covers, which were; "Fuck tha Police" by N.W.A and "You Spin Me Round (Like a Record)" by English new wave band Dead or Alive, which featured in the movie American Psycho. "Debonaire" was also featured on the Scream 3 movie soundtrack and the first The Fast and the Furious movie during the police raid on Johnny Tran's house scene.

Dope toured extensively, taking part in several national tours with various acts ranging from Alice Cooper to Kid Rock. This helped Felons and Revolutionaries SoundScan more than 250,000 units in total.

A live video for the song "Sick" was recorded to capture the energy of the group's live show. The first single and non-live promotional video released by the band from the album was "Everything Sucks", which failed to chart. The second single, a cover of "You Spin Me Round", saw the band gaining more attention; it received radio play and reached No. 37 on the US Mainstream Rock charts.

=== Life (2001–2002) ===
After the relative success of their debut album, Dope decided to record a follow-up entitled Life. Several band changes had taken place once more; Tripp Eisen was fired from the group and joined industrial metal band Static-X, so Virus, a guitarist/producer from New York City who was originally hired for bass, replaced him on guitar in 2000. Acey Slade was moved to the position of guitar, while Sloane Jentry (who had remained friends with the band) rejoined, this time on bass. On drums, Preston Nash was replaced by Racci "Sketchy" Shay.

The two singles from Life; "Now or Never" and "Slipping Away" reached No. 28 and No. 29 on the Mainstream Rock charts respectively. The album itself reached No. 180 on the Billboard charts and No. 6 on the Top Heatseekers, which up until that point was the band's highest charting. After the album's release, Simon Dope left the group to pursue a career as a video game producer.

"Debonaire" from the first album was used in the movie The Fast and the Furious. More soundtrack work was done by Dope in 2002, as the band recorded WWE chairman Vince McMahon's theme song "No Chance" for the WWF Forceable Entry audio release. Dope's music had previously been used as the background theme in ECW, and Rhino also used "Debonaire" as his entrance theme.

Around this period, Edsel Dope also had a public rivalry with the band Murderdolls, particularly vocalist Wednesday 13. An early version of that group had featured Racci Shay on drums; and under the name Murderdolls, it featured Tripp Eisen. Dope guitarist Acey Slade then left the band to join Murderdolls in mid-2002.

=== Group Therapy and American Apathy (2003–2007) ===
Disappointed with the label's perceived lack of promotion for the album, the band left Epic Records. The band signed with Recon Records, which was later bought out by Artemis Records, a New York independent record label. Dope's third studio album was titled Group Therapy. A song from that album, Today is the Day served as the official theme song for WWE's pay-per-view event No Mercy 2003 in October.

By 2005, Dope had regrouped once more, the band had a new bassist, Brian "Brix" Milner (former guitarist and keyboardist for Orlando's Skrape). For their new album entitled American Apathy, the band returned to a harder sound similar in some respects to their debut, in an industrial metal style. Although released eight years after the band formed, four albums in and on an independent label, American Apathy performed well in the charts. It was a No. 1 hit on the Top Heatseekers chart, for the first time in the band's history and it also saw the band's highest charting on the Billboard chart to date.

Ben Graves of the Murderdolls joined Dope as the live drummer on a tour of Japan. In 2006 Dope bassist Brix Milner played in Murderdolls front man Wednesday 13's solo band, replacing the injured Kid Kid. Edsel Dope and Virus became involved in an alternative pop/rock side-project called Makeshift Romeo.

In April 2006, Dope signed with V2 Records. However, all of V2's acts, including Dope, were dropped in January 2007.

=== No Regrets (2008–2012) ===
No Regrets is the band's fifth studio album. The album was released on March 10, 2009. The album debuted at No. 88 with 6,200 copies sold in its first week, making it the highest-charted album in the band's history. This CD is different from past releases in that the name of the CD is repeated in many of the songs, including "Dirty World", "My Funeral", "We Are", and the CD's title track. "Addiction" is the third single from the album. The song features a guitar solo by the guest musician Zakk Wylde.

Dope has finished their spring tour of the United States, the tour, which took place over two months, included 22 dates. Tripp Lee played live on bass with the band (although Brix is still listed, and seems doubtful that he will return) and a new drummer named Angel Bartolotta, formerly of Pig and The Genitorturers has joined.

It was announced on October 15, 2008, that the first single from No Regrets is called "Violence". The song is currently available to listen on the band's MySpace. One of the tracks for the album was released in late 2007 in the game, Guitar Hero III: Legends of Rock. Guitar Hero III includes a song by Dope called "Nothing for Me Here" on the bonus list and mentions that it will be on the band's upcoming album.

Some time in early 2009, Dope updated their official website, which now features promotion for No Regrets, which was released on March 10, 2009. Previews of eight tracks from the new album can be heard via the music player on the site. In addition to this, the full music video for the single Addiction, which features Zakk Wylde of Black Label Society and well-known guitarist for Ozzy Osbourne is available to be viewed on the site. One of the tracks on the new album is a cover of the Billy Idol single, "Rebel Yell".

On July 29, 2008, Dope released American Apathy Reloaded—a CD of remixes and alternate versions of songs from American Apathy, plus a live DVD.

Dope has released a video to go along with the second single on the album, "6-6-Sick".

The song "Nothing for Me Here" is featured in the video game Guitar Hero III: Legends of Rock as a bonus track, therefore making the song's original release date in 2007, 2 years before No Regrets was released.

Virus, the lead guitarist, teaches guitar/bass at the Paul Green School of Rock in Fort Washington, Pennsylvania.

Virus also produces up-and-coming bands and writes music for TV and video game companies such as Activision, Disney and ESPN.

In 2011, Dope performed at the Gathering of the Juggalos.

On August 12, 2011, Dope played at Mojoes in Joliet, Illinois.

In 2012, Virus joined David Draiman's band Device.

=== Blood Money Part 1 + Part Zer0 (2013–present) ===
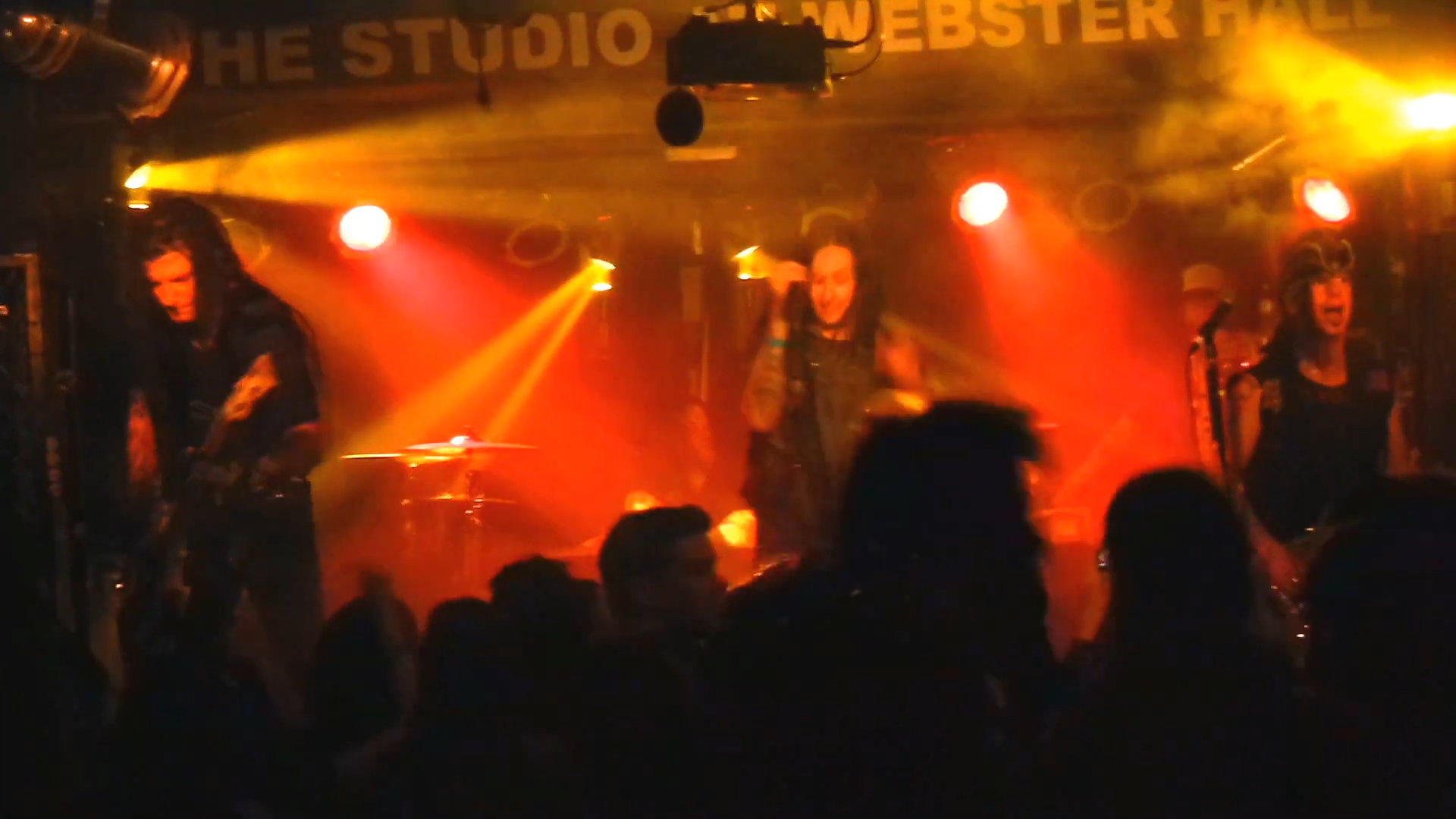
Dope performing in 2013

On the September 19, 2013, the band officially released a teaser for the song "Drug Music" from their upcoming sixth studio album, entitled "Blood Money" via their Facebook page. The album was originally set to be released in March 2014. However, in an interview with Dee J. Nelson, it was said that the release will take place in the summer. The music video for the album's first single "Selfish" was released on August 26, 2014, as frontman Edsel Dope announced that Blood Money will be a two-part album. In 2015, Dope announced the dates for the "Die Mother Fucker Die" reunion tour, featuring the classic lineup of Edsel Dope, Virus, Acey Slade, and Racci Shay. Dope also recorded their very first live album in Moscow which featured the four long time friends and bandmates. Dope's live album, titled "Live In Moscow", was released in 2016 summer via a fan-funded process through their website where all those who pre-ordered the live album and/or contributed to the fundraiser would have their name listed in the album's liner notes and would subsequently make the website's virtual thermometer grow as fans shopped around the website. The Thermometer would display the overall progress in reaching various fundraiser goals such as the release of the live DVD and making it to United Kingdom and Europe for a tour.

After the release of their first live album, the band announced that they will be releasing their long-awaited album "Blood Money, Part 1" in the fall of 2016, also stating that the second part of "Blood Money" would not see such lengthy delays as Part 1 did.

Dope released the official music video for the two-part album's title track "Blood Money" on July 16, 2016. The band released the second single on the album entitled "Hold On" on August 26, 2016, as well as the official music video. Blood Money part 1 was officially released worldwide on October 28, 2016, via eOne Entertainment.

After the release of "Blood Money, Part 1", Dope went to tour Russia and the United Kingdom as the headlining act as well as having toured with the classic lineup featured in the "Die Mother Fucker Die Reunion" tour. This reunion tour had guitarist Virus, drummer Racci Shay, and bassist Acey Slade return for the occasion.

In the beginning of 2017, Dope released tour dates for Spring 2017, touring with co-headliner Combichrist and supporting acts September Mourning and Davey Suicide. They also released more tour dates for Fall 2017, this time touring with Hed PE.

In 2019, Dope toured with Static-X, DevilDriver, Wednesday 13, and Raven Black in the US. In 2023, they are part of the Rise of the Machine tour with Static-X, Fear Factory, Mushroomhead and Twiztid.

On July 19, 2022, the band announced Blood Money Part Zer0, the prequel to "Blood Money, Part 1" as a free digital download for its release in 2023. The band also shared the songs "No Respect" and "Believe" on the same day. On August 22, 2022, a music video for Believe was released to YouTube. On September 7, they released a third new single from Blood Money Part Zer0, "Fuck It Up".

On December 7, 2022, Dope released the "Best Of Me" EP, featuring 4 songs.

On January 25, 2023, Dope released the "Dive" EP, featuring the previously released singles.

On February 7, 2023, Dope released the "Dead World" EP, featuring the aforementioned singles.

On February 14, 2023, Dope released the "Lovesong" EP, featuring the previous singles as well as a cover of "Lovesong" by The Cure. On February 24, 2023, Dope released "Blood Money Part Zer0" as a free digital download.

== Musical style, influences and lyrics ==
Dope have been described as alternative metal, nu metal, and industrial metal. Dope's influences include Judas Priest, Iron Maiden, Ministry, Nine Inch Nails, Kiss, Guns N' Roses, White Zombie, Mötley Crüe, Slayer, and Overkill. Dope's lyrics are known for being obscene and aggressive. In a review of Dope's album Felons and Revolutionaries, NME said "In American Pie, a boy puts his cock in an apple pie, to let us know that there's something rotten at the heart of the American Dream. Ex-con brothers Edsel and Simon Dope, though, would probably put someone else's cock in the apple pie, cut it off, lace the pie with strychnine, and serve it up at the Clinton dinner table."

In terms of composition, the band mostly relies on simplicity. Edsel Dope describes one of his songs "Pig Society" a song that "encompasses the spirit of the band at its core development. Angry, simple, and full of middle fingers".

The band's song "Die MF Die" has become Dope's most popular song and has also been used during military operations. About the song, Edsel Dope explained:

It is a very progressive but very fun 'tongue in cheek' song. The real amazement to me is the power that song took on over the years and how many things it's done beyond way more than I ever thought it would. Apparently that song was used as kind of a battle cry for lots of soldiers as they went into the Iraq war and was used in training. There have been other rumours that they have used it when they have interrogated Iraqi POWs. It is kind of an aggressive song for people to lose their minds. It took on a whole other life that I had never ever imagined".

== Members ==
=== Current members ===
- Edsel Dope – lead vocals, programming (1997–present), rhythm guitar (1997–2000, 2002–present), keyboards (2002–present)
- Acey Slade – bass (1998–2001, 2015–2017, 2018–present), lead guitar (2023–present), backing vocals (1998–2000, 2015–2017, 2018–present), rhythm guitar (2000–2002)
- Virus – lead guitar, backing vocals (2000–2013, 2015–2017, 2018–present), keyboards (2002–2013, 2015–2017, 2018–present)
- Daniel Fox – drums (2004–2005, 2013–2015, 2017, 2019–present), occasional bass (2023–present), backing vocals (2023–present)

=== Current touring musicians ===
- Chris Warner – drums (2017–2019, 2023–present; substitute for Daniel Fox)

== Discography ==
Studio albums

- Felons and Revolutionaries (1999)
- Life (2001)
- Group Therapy (2003)
- American Apathy (2005)
- No Regrets (2009)
- Blood Money Part 1 (2016)
- Blood Money Part Zer0 (2023)
