= Felons and Revolutionaries =

Studio album by Dope
- Released: September 14, 1999
- Recorded: 1999
- Studio: Greene Street Recording (New York City)
- Genres: Nu metal; industrial metal; speed metal
- Length: 47:41
- Labels: Epic; Flip
- Producers: Edsel Dope; John Travis

Dope chronology
Felons and Revolutionaries (1999)	Life (2001)

Singles from Felons and Revolutionaries
- 1. "Debonaire" / "Sick" Released: 1999; 2. "Pig Society" Released: 1999; 3. "Everything Sucks" Released: 1999; 4. "You Spin Me Round (Like a Record)" Released: 2000

Professional ratings
Review scores
Source	Rating
AllMusic	3/5 stars
Collector's Guide to Heavy Metal	4/10
Metal Hammer	7/10
NME	7/10

Felons and Revolutionaries is the debut studio album by American industrial metal band Dope. The album was released in 1999 on Epic Records and has sold over 236,000 copies in the United States, making it their best-selling album to date. It was re-released on June 17, 2000, with their cover of the Dead or Alive hit "You Spin Me Round (Like a Record)" as a bonus track. "Pig Society", "Everything Sucks", "Sick", and "Debonaire" were also released as singles, but did not chart.

== Track listing ==
All tracks are written by Edsel Dope, except where noted.

No.	Title	Writer(s)	Length
1.	"Pig Society"		3:14
2.	"Debonaire"		2:33
3.	"Everything Sucks"		3:01
4.	"Sick"	Edsel Dope; Simon Dope	3:11
5.	"Kimberly's Ghost"		3:18
6.	"Spine for You"		4:39
7.	"One Fix"		3:41
8.	"Fuck tha Police" (N.W.A cover)	Ice Cube; MC Ren	4:04
9.	"Intervention"		2:45
10.	"America the Pitiful"		2:42
11.	"Shit Life"		4:13
12.	"Wake Up"		3:20
13.	"I Am Nothing"		4:12
Total length:			47:41

Later pressing bonus track
No.	Title	Writer(s)	Length
14.	"You Spin Me Round (Like a Record)" (Dead or Alive cover)	Pete Burns; Steve Coy; Wayne Hussey; Tim Lever; Mike Percy	2:43

- The track listing on the back cover of some pressings does not list the song "Fuck tha Police" as appearing on the record. This is most likely due to a typographical error, censorship, or the producers using too much of the space on the back of the album for the artwork. The original pressing for the album's Canadian release does list the song on the back cover. There are also reports that some versions of the album actually did not contain this song.
- On the later pressing that included "You Spin Me 'Round (Like a Record)", the song "Everything Sucks" is actually the Andy Wallace remix version.

== Appearances in other media ==
- "Debonaire" is used during the SWAT assault scene in the movie The Fast and the Furious.
- "Debonaire" is featured in the Scream 3 soundtrack.
- "Debonaire" was used as the entrance theme of the wrestler Rhino in ECW. It was also used as the opening song for their video game Anarchy Rulz. Also used in the movie Run All Night starring Liam Neeson and Joel Kinnaman.

== Personnel ==
Dope

- Edsel Dope – lead vocals, programming, rhythm guitar, bass
- Simon Dope – keyboards, percussion, sampling
- Tripp Eisen – lead guitar, backing vocals
- Acey Slade – bass, backing vocals
- Preston Nash – drums

Additional personnel

- DJ Lethal – screaming hummingbird on track 12
- The N.Y.C. Dope Choir – backing vocals on track eight

Production

- Jordan Schur – executive production and A&R
- Edsel Dope – production, arrangements, artwork, design, digital editing, engineering, layout, mixing
- Chip Quigley – management and direction
- John Travis – production, engineering, recording, mixing
- Acey Slade – engineering
- Eric Too – assistant engineering
- Derek Carlson – assistant engineering
- Mr. Big Head – assistant engineering
- Jay Baumgardner – mixing
- Blumpy – mixing
- Will Gibson – A&R coordination for Flip
- Kaz Utsunomiya – A&R for Epic
- Larry Robinson – business affairs
- Joe Serling – legal representation
- Howie Weinberg – mastering
- Roger Lian – editing
- John Ditmar – booking
- Peter Ciccotto – design
- Marina Chavez – photography
- Chapman Baehler – photography
- Mear at Conart – artwork

== Chart positions ==
Album

Chart (1999)	Peak position
US Top Heatseekers	25

Single

Song	Chart (2000)	Peak position
"You Spin Me Round (Like a Record)"	US Mainstream Rock Tracks	37
