= Edsel Dope =

American singer and musician

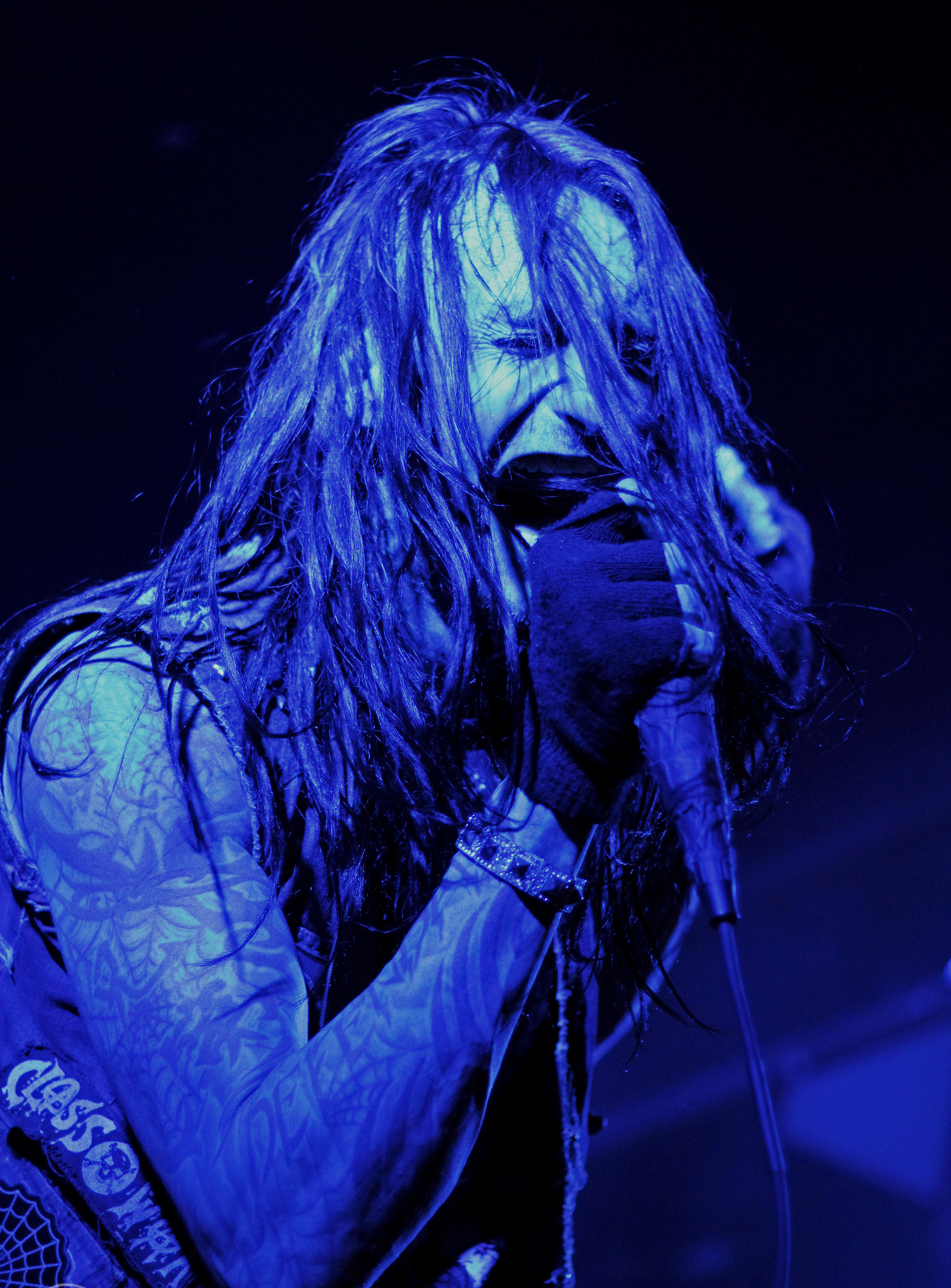
- Edsel Dope performing in 2015

Background information
- Also known as: Xer0
- Born: Brian Charles Ebejer; March 21, 1974 (age 52); West Palm Beach, Florida, U.S.
- Origin: New York City, U.S.
- Genres: Industrial metal; nu metal
- Occupations: Singer; musician; producer
- Instruments: Vocals; guitar; keyboards
- Years active: 1997–present
- Member of: Dope; Makeshift Romeo; Static-X
- Website: dopetheband.com

Brian Charles Ebejer (born March 21, 1974), known professionally as Edsel Dope, is an American musician who is the lead singer, rhythm guitarist and main songwriter for industrial metal band Dope. Dope was founded in 1997 by Edsel and his brother Simon (keyboards) in New York City.

Edsel has co-produced all of Dope's albums. On Felons and Revolutionaries, Dope's first album released in 1999, Edsel played and programmed most of the musical instruments. Drummed for Makeshift Romeo.

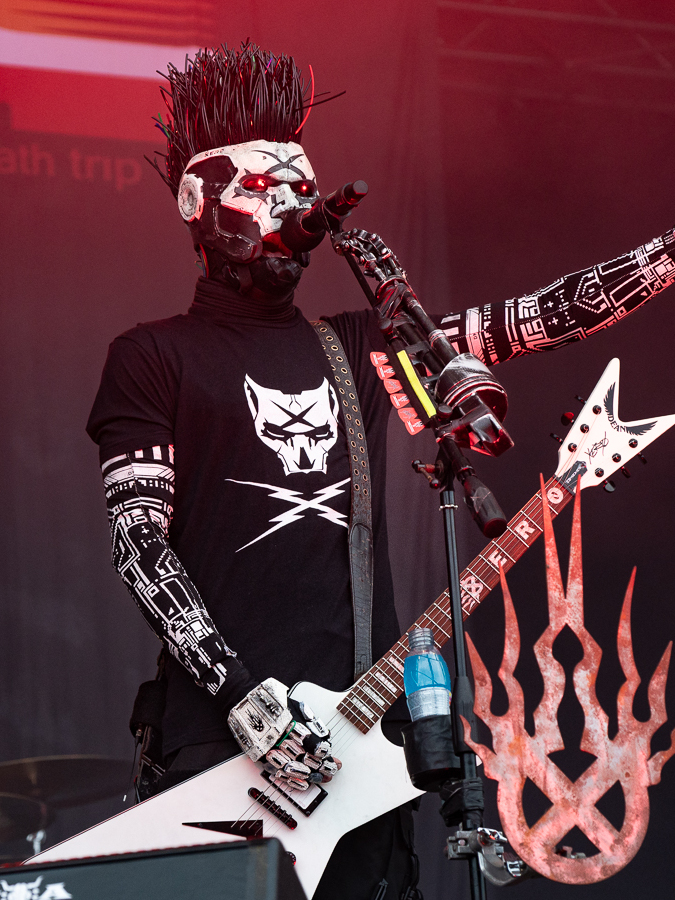
Dope, as Xer0, performing with Static-X in 2025

In 2019, a masked lead vocalist and rhythm guitarist joined Static-X under the moniker Xer0. Edsel Dope was widely believed to be Xer0, and it was eventually revealed that he is. However, he does not want to be seen as the face of Static-X, reserving that position for the late Wayne Static.

== Personal life ==
Edsel Dope is engaged and has a daughter born in 2020.

== Discography ==
Dope

- Felons and Revolutionaries (1999)
- Life (2001)
- Group Therapy (2003)
- American Apathy (2005)
- No Regrets (2009)
- Blood Money Part 1 (2016)
- Blood Money Part Zer0 (2023)

Static-X (as Xer0)

- Project: Regeneration Vol. 1 (2020)
- Project: Regeneration Vol. 2 (2024)
