= Undead Unplugged =

Studio album by Wednesday 13
- Released: July 7, 2014
- Genre: Horror punk, acoustic
- Length: 38:20
- Label: Wednesday 13 LLC

Wednesday 13 chronology
The Dixie Dead (2013)	Undead Unplugged (2014)	Dead Meat: 10 Years of Blood, Feathers & Lipstick (2014)

Undead Unplugged is the first acoustic album by horror punk musician Wednesday 13. It features mainly acoustic versions of songs from his solo career, with one original track entitled "Undead". The album also features acoustic versions of Murderdolls and Frankenstein Drag Queens From Planet 13 songs, both being bands Wednesday had fronted in the past.

== Background ==
Before the release of the album, Wednesday 13 released a few acoustic versions of songs from Bloodwork and Spook and Destroy EPs with an acoustic version of "Curse of Me" first appearing on Spook and Destroy. The album was released shortly after "The Undead Unplugged UK Tour" in May 2014. The tour featured only 3 musicians with Wednesday on vocals and guitar and Roman Surman and Jack Tankersley on guitar. Despite Roman's involvement in the tour only Wednesday and Jack performed on the album.

== Track listing ==
No.	Title	Originally from	Length
1.	"Undead"		1:58
2.	"Dead Carolina"	Skeletons	2:55
3.	"Haunt Me"	Transylvania 90210: Songs of Death, Dying, and the Dead	4:06
4.	"Nowhere" (Murderdolls cover)		4:28
5.	"Morgue Than Words"	Fang Bang	2:58
6.	"Curse of Me"	Fang Bang	3:41
7.	"Welcome to the Strange" (Frankenstein Drag Queens from Planet 13 cover)		4:06
8.	"Scary Song" (Frankenstein Drag Queens from Planet 13 cover)		2:50
9.	"We All Die"	Calling All Corpses	2:59
10.	"Ghosts Stories"	The Dixie Dead	4:07
11.	"Transylvania 90210"	Transylvania 90210: Songs of Death, Dying, and the Dead	3:52

== Personnel ==
- Wednesday 13 - All vocals, guitars & keyboards
- Jack Tankersley - lead guitar on "Scary song", "Curse of Me", "Welcome to the Strange", and "Ghost Stories"
