= Murderdolls discography =

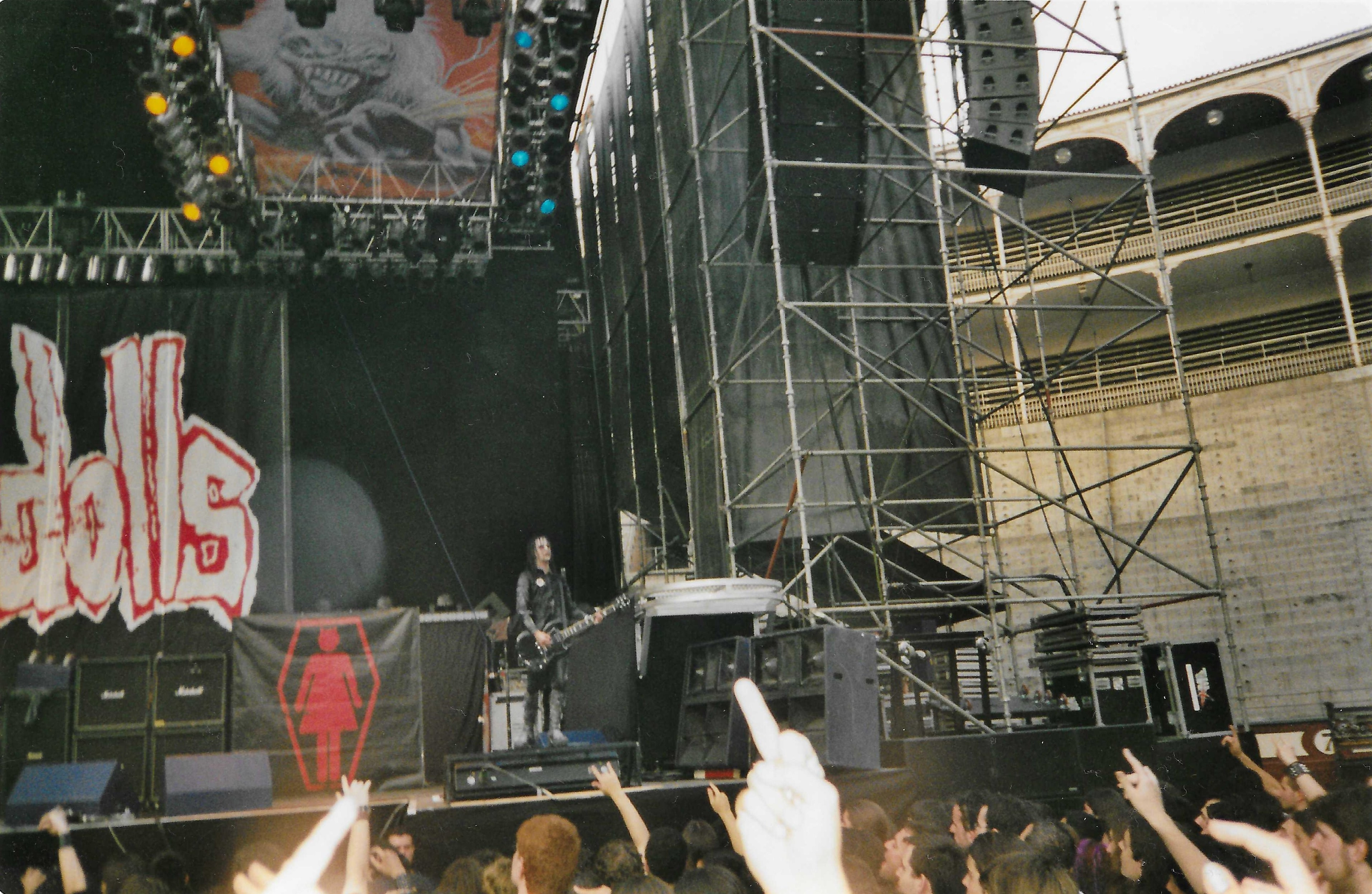
- Studio albums: 2
- Extended plays: 1
- Compilation albums: 2
- Singles: 5
- Music videos: 5

Murderdolls is an American horror punk band. Their discography currently consists of two studio albums, two compilation albums, one extended play, and five singles. These figures do not account for material released by members' side projects.

The Murderdolls first release was an extended play, entitled Right to Remain Violent. It was released in early 2002 on Roadrunner Records. It is considered to be a promotional album for their upcoming studio album. The album consists of three tracks that were later featured on their debut studio album. It did not make it onto any charts.

Their debut album, Beyond the Valley of the Murderdolls, was a studio album, consisting of 15 tracks. It was released in mid-2002 on Roadrunner Records. There were three versions released, the original issue, the limited edition, released in 2003, and the Enhanced DVD. The album peaked at number 40 in the UK, 102 in the US, and 144 in France.

Their second album, Women & Children Last was a studio album consisting of 14 tracks. It was released in August 2010.

The three singles they released include "Dead in Hollywood", "White Wedding", and "My Dark Place Alone". "Dead in Hollywood" peaked at 54 on the UK charts. "White Wedding" peaked at 24 on the same chart.

== Albums ==
=== Studio albums ===
Title	Album details	Peak chart positions										Certifications (sales thresholds)
Title	Album details	US	AUS	AUT	FIN	FRA	GER	NLD	SWE	SWI	UK	Certifications (sales thresholds)
Beyond the Valley of the Murderdolls	Released: August 20, 2002; Label: Roadrunner; Format: CD, CS, CD/DVD, CD+, DL, LP	102	—	—	—	144	84	—	—	—	40	BPI: Silver
Women and Children Last	Released: August 31, 2010; Label: Roadrunner; Format: CD, CD/DVD, DL	43	18	53	34	67	48	86	43	71	33	
"—" denotes a release that did not chart.

=== Compilation albums ===
Title	Album details
The Complete Albums	Released: 2019; Label: WMG, X5; Format: DL
White Wedding	Released: 2020; Label: WMG, X5; Format: DL

== Extended plays ==
Title	EP details
Right to Remain Violent	Released: 2002; Label: Roadrunner; Format: CD

== Singles ==
Title	Year	Peak chart positions		Album
Title	Year	GER	UK	Album
"Dead in Hollywood"	2002	—	54	Beyond the Valley of the Murderdolls
"White Wedding"	2003	97	24	Beyond the Valley of the Murderdolls
"My Dark Place Alone"	2010	—	—	Women and Children Last
"Summertime Suicide"	2010	—	—	Women and Children Last
"Nowhere"	2010	—	—	Women and Children Last
"—" denotes a release that did not chart.

== Other appearances ==
Title	Year	Album
"197666"	2002	Dawson's Creek
"Dead in Hollywood"	2002	Dawson's Creek

== Music videos ==
Title	Year	Director
"Dead in Hollywood"	2002	Paul R. Brown
"White Wedding"	2003	The Jay; Tony Show
"Love at First Fright"	2003	Bryan Domyan
"I Love to Say Fuck"(Live)	2003	
"My Dark Place Alone"	2010	Paul R. Brown
"Drug Me to Hell"	2010	
"Summertime Suicide"	2010	
"Chapel of Blood"	2010	
"Nowhere"	2010	Paul R. Brown
