= Fuck It, We'll Do It Live =

Live album by Wednesday 13
- Released: October 21, 2008
- Recorded: July 18, 2008
- Venue: Crocodile Rock in Allentown, Pennsylvania
- Genres: Horror punk, heavy metal
- Length: 66:51

Wednesday 13 chronology
Skeletons (2008)	Fuck It, We'll Do It Live (2008)	From Here to the Hearse (2010)

Fuck It, We'll Do It Live is the first live album by American horror punk musician Wednesday 13. It contains a live performance recorded at the Crocodile Rock in Allentown, Pennsylvania on July 18, 2008. The album was released on October 21, 2008, through Hot Topic locations in the United States and on website Interpunk.com, in a two-disc format with recordings of the live performance on CD and DVD.

The album was inspired by a video clip featuring television personality Bill O'Reilly. In an outtake from Inside Edition from 1993 popularized on the Internet, O'Reilly shouts "Fuck it, we'll do it live!" after becoming frustrated by a last-minute alteration to the show's teleprompter text. The band members watched the video clip of this incident repeatedly and decided that it was emblematic of how they wanted to record a live show – without overdubbing in post-production. Personnel in the group for the live show included Wednesday 13 on vocals and guitar, Jason Trioxin on guitar, Nate Manor on bass, and Jonny Chops on drums.

Fuck It, We'll Do It Live received a generally positive reception from music critics. Metal Storm reviewed the release and described the album as an ideal introduction to Wednesday 13, comparing the style of music to glam punk. Metal Ireland recommended the music for its simple, B-movie quality. Global Domination wrote that the album broke the trend of inadvisable purchases of live performances. The release received favorable reviews from Metal.de and MusicWaves; the latter compared the album's style to that of Alice Cooper and Marilyn Manson. The Swedish-language review site Hallowed.se found the recording to be unexciting.

== Production ==
=== Inspiration ===
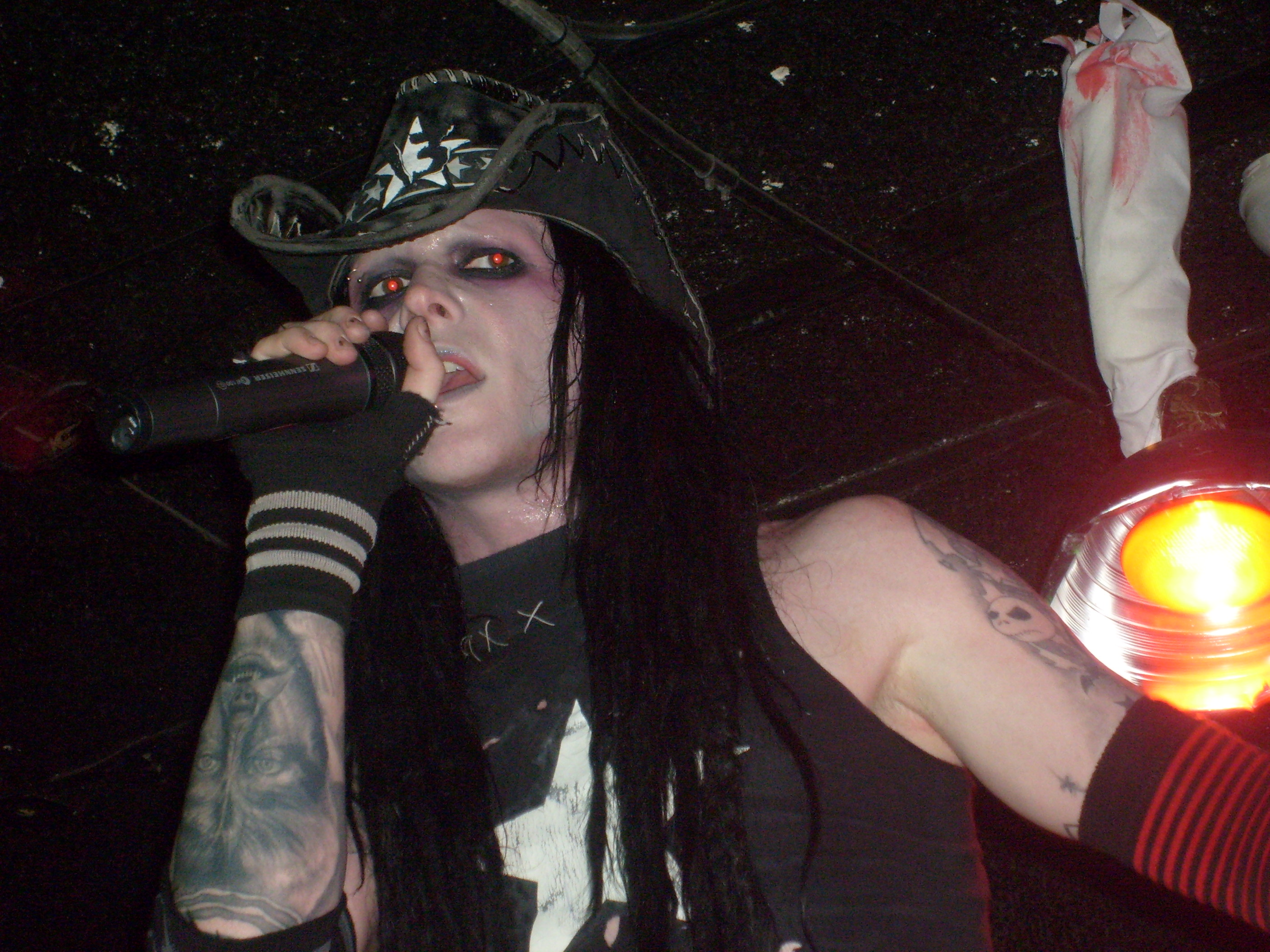
Wednesday 13 in 2007

Fuck It, We'll Do It Live was inspired by a video clip featuring television personality Bill O'Reilly. In an outtake from Inside Edition popularized on the Internet, O'Reilly shouts "Fuck it, we'll do it live!" after becoming frustrated by a last-minute alteration to the show's teleprompter text.

Wednesday 13 explained the album's inspiration in an interview: "Wednesday 13 (the band) has a live DVD that I put out and we couldn't think of a title and we were driving down the road thinking, we are going to have to come up with a name for it. The live titles, you have to put something like that. So, we were watching Bill O'Reilly and we kept listening to him say, 'Fuck it, we'll do it live.' That's kind of how quick we threw that DVD together. We didn't know we were putting it together like 4 days before so we were like, 'fuck it, we'll do it live.' We didn't do any overdubs on it, everybody in the band was sick and we just went with it."

=== Live recording ===
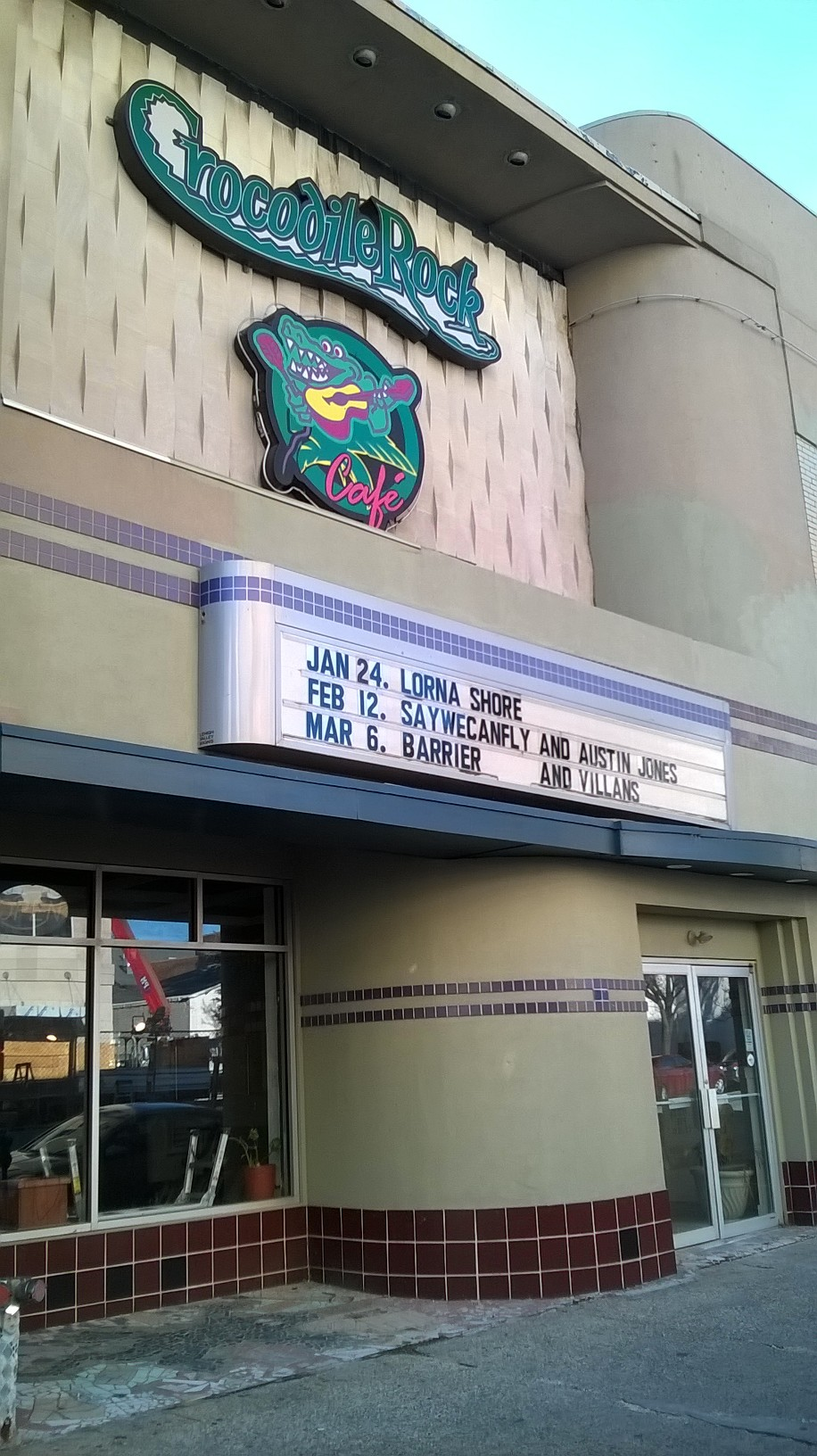
The exterior of Crocodile Rock in Allentown, Pennsylvania, where the album was recorded

Fuck It, We'll Do It Live was recorded live on July 18, 2008, at the Crocodile Rock nightclub in Allentown, Pennsylvania. Personnel in the group for the live show included Wednesday 13 on vocals and guitar, Jason Trioxin on guitar, Nate Manor on bass, and Jonny Chops on drums.

Wednesday 13 explained that he had been in a motor vehicle accident in September 2007 and had fractured his clavicle, and had subsequently decided to expand the band from four to five members. By the time of the live recording, he had healed sufficiently to both perform as frontman and play guitar, and the band was reduced back to its normal size of four members. This was Wednesday 13's first live album. In an interview with SF Weekly, Wednesday 13 spoke about his touring band. "This is like my favorite lineup that I've ever had, and I've definitely had members come and go for many different reasons over the years."

The video of the performance was recorded using six cameras. At brief times during the performance, the video recorded a moment of white on camera or a dark screen, both of which were related to the use of strobe lights. An individual dressed in costume as Friday the 13th character Jason Voorhees made an appearance on-stage at one point during the performance.

=== Post-production ===
No post-production overdubbing was done in the studio. Occasional wrong notes can be heard in the final product of the recording. Wednesday 13 admitted, "First off, let me say this is a live recording. This is not a live recording where we went back into the studio and overdubbed guitar parts or vocals. This is us ... LIVE! If we make a mistake, you will hear it. If my voice cracks, you hear it. This is as close to a live experience as we could give."

=== Release ===
The album was released on October 21, 2008, timed to coincide with Halloween. The album was made available as a two-disc set, with audio tracks on one in CD format and video recording of the live performance on the other in DVD format. The DVD contains a live video recording of the performance, without special features or DVD extras. The packaging also included a 20-panel booklet featuring photographs of the group performing, taken by their fans. Wednesday 13 commented, "This release is for the fans and we want them to feel like they are part of everything we do."

The album was Wednesday 13's first production released in a dual CD/DVD format, and the first time he had released a recording of a complete live concert show. The album was sold through Hot Topic stores and Interpunk.com. Wednesday 13 appeared for fans to sign albums on October 24 in Parsippany, New Jersey, as part of the Chiller Theatre Expo, which showcased films, models, and toys related to the horror genre. On October 30, Wednesday 13 joined Hanoi Rocks frontman Michael Monroe at Fopp Records in Covent Garden, London, England, for a session signing merchandise for fans. This event included an exclusive release of the DVD recording of Fuck It, We'll Do It Live. The DVD was featured as the first release in the "Live & Loud" collection by Global Music.

== Reception ==
Fuck It, We'll Do It Live
Review scores
Source	Rating
MusicWaves	4/5 stars
Metal Ireland	3.5/5 stars
Metal.de	8/10
The Metal Forge	8/10
Metal Storm	7/10
MetalFan.NL	70/100

Metal Storm reviewed the DVD recording of the live performance and called it "a perfect way to discover the music of Wednesday 13 that I could describe as a mix of Glam with Punk". Justin Donnelly reviewed the album for The Metal Forge and wrote favorably about the DVD portion: "Shot with six cameras, Fuck It, We'll Do It Live is a raw and honest representation of Wednesday 13 live in concert". A review by Metal Rage was critical of the DVD, but praised the audio on the CD: "All in all I definitely recommend the CD, 'cause you get a nice representative image of what a good Wednesday 13 show sounds like."

Dónal McBrien gave the performance 3.8 stars out of 5 in a review for Metal Ireland writing: "It's horror punk, and you get exactly what you expect. Songs in the key of B-movie, with faux-horror lyrics and hook-laden riffs that work surprisingly well for their simplicity."

The album received a score of 70/100 from Dutch-language music site Metalfan.NL, which preferred the DVD to the CD version. French-language site MusicWaves gave the album a rating of 4 out of 5 stars, and compared Wednesday 13's style to that of Alice Cooper and Marilyn Manson. The album received a rating of 8/10 from German-language site Metal.de, which recommended it as a good gift. The Swedish-language review site Hallowed.se found the album to be boring.

== Track listing ==
All tracks written by Wednesday 13 unless otherwise stated.

Fuck It, We'll Do It Live
No.	Title	Writer(s)	Length
1.	"Gimmie Gimmie Bloodshed"		1:43
2.	"I Want You...Dead"		2:18
3.	"My Home Sweet Homicide"		4:00
4.	"Not Another Teenage Anthem"		2:59
5.	"From Here to the Hearse"		3:55
6.	"Till Death Do Us Party"		3:21
7.	"Skeletons"		4:18
8.	"God Is a Lie"		4:22
9.	"House by the Cemetery"		3:39
10.	"Put Your Death Mask on"		3:05
11.	"Happily Ever Cadaver"		4:29
12.	"Runnin' Down a Dream"	Tom Petty and the Heartbreakers	3:33
13.	"Look What the Bats Dragged in"		3:37
14.	"Faith in the Devil"		3:10
15.	"197666"	Frankenstein Drag Queens from Planet 13	2:39
16.	"Rambo"	Frankenstein Drag Queens from Planet 13	2:54
17.	"Bad Things"		3:57
18.	"I Love to Say Fuck"	Frankenstein Drag Queens from Planet 13	6:21
Total length:			66:51

== Personnel ==
- Wednesday 13 – vocals, guitar
- Jason Trioxin – guitar
- Nate Manor – bass
- Jonny Chops – drums
