= Songs from the Recently Deceased =

Studio album by Frankenstein Drag Queens from Planet 13
- Released: 1999
- Genre: Horror punk
- Length: 50:58
- Label: Uncle God Damn (USA); People Like You (Europe)

Frankenstein Drag Queens from Planet 13 chronology
Night of the Living Drag Queens (1998)	Songs from the Recently Deceased (1999)	Viva Las Violence (2001)

Professional ratings
Review scores
Source	Rating
Metal Hammer	8/10

Songs from the Recently Deceased is the third full-length release by American punk band the Frankenstein Drag Queens from Planet 13. It was originally released on Uncle God Damn Records in 1999, and was later re-released on Century Media Records in collaboration with People Like You Records in 2000 as a Digi-Pack. It is also featured in the 2006 box set "Little Box of Horrors".

This album was recorded in two separate sessions. In the first session, the band recorded the basic guitar, bass, drums and vocals for the album. Three to four months later, the band returned to the studio, and put the finishing touches on all the songs. A few of the songs had different titles during the first session and the second, such as "I Was a Teenage Ghoulscout", which was originally named "Rat Race", and "Plan 9 from Outa Space", which was originally named "Get Outta My Face".

== Track listing ==
1. "Ghouls Just Wanna Have Fun" – 1:01
2. "Hooray for Horrorwood" – 2:18
3. "Creature from the Black Lagoon" – 3:25
4. "Oogie Boogie Baby Baby" – 3:00
5. "Monster Monster 13 Oh Yeah" – 0:47
6. "The Rocketship Oddity 13" – 3:33
7. "Bride of Frankenstein" – 2:27
8. "The Witch is Dead" – 4:34
9. "Back in Blacula" – 2:01
10. "The Last Halloween - The Story of Trick or Treat Pete" – 3:19
11. "I Was a Teenage Ghoulscout" – 2:16
12. "Welcome to the Strange" (cover of "Riders on the Storm" by The Doors) – 2:57
13. "They Only Wanna Eat Your Brains" – 2:14
14. "Plan 9 from Outer Space" – 3:03
15. "Neon Black" – 3:44
16. "La La for Lon Chaney, Jr" – 0:49
- The 2000 re-release also included 2 extra tracks:
1. "I Love to Say Fuck" – 4:45
2. "I Love to Say Fuck" (Evil Dead-ited Radio Mix) – 4:45

== Trivia ==
- "Hooray for Horrorwood" was later re-recorded and renamed "Dead in Hollywood" for the Murderdolls album Beyond the valley of the murderdolls. "I Love to Say Fuck" has been re-recorded twice by Frankenstein Drag Queens from Planet 13 vocalist Wednesday 13, in his later acts. The first re-recording was by Murderdolls, a side project 13 was involved in until its hiatus in 2004. The second re-recording was by Wednesday 13's solo band of the same name, and was released on his 2008 EP, Bloodwork.

== Album credits ==
- Wednesday 13: Guitar, vocals (Credited as "Blood curdling screams, and graveyard gunslinger of the wicked west")
- Sicko Zero: Drums (Credited as "Dead beats and master of the macabre")
- Seaweed: Bass (Credited as "Space bass and mind control")
