= Dead Meat: 10 Years of Blood, Feathers & Lipstick =

Compilation album by Wednesday 13
- Released: July 7, 2014
- Genre: Horror punk, heavy metal
- Length: 3:40:48
- Label: Wednesday 13 LLC

Wednesday 13 chronology
| Undead Unplugged (2014) | Dead Meat: 10 Years of Blood, Feathers & Lipstick (2014) | Monsters of the Universe: Come Out and Plague (2015) |

Dead Meat: 10 Years of Blood, Feathers & Lipstick is a box set and 2nd compilation album by horror punk musician Wednesday 13. It's a collection that spans his solo career from 2003-2013 and other projects he fronted such as Murderdolls and Frankenstein Drag Queens From Planet 13 It features 4 discs. A best of compilation, a collection of demos and the entire Re-Animated EP with extra remixes.

== Background ==
The album was released by Wednesday on July 8, 2014, to celebrate 10 years as a solo musician. It was released on the same day as his Acoustic album Undead Unplugged.

== Track listing ==
Disc 1: Best of the Worst
| No. | Title | Length |
|---|---|---|
| 1. | "Mr. Motherfucker" | 2:03 |
| 2. | "I Love To Say Fuck" | 4:55 |
| 3. | "Rambo" | 2:29 |
| 4. | "Bad Things" | 3:31 |
| 5. | "Scream Baby Scream" | 4:04 |
| 6. | "Gimme Gimme Bloodshed" | 2:22 |
| 7. | "Skeletons" | 4:53 |
| 8. | "From Here To the Hearse" | 3:47 |
| 9. | "I Wanna Be Cremated" | 4:07 |
| 10. | "Calling All Corpses" | 2:34 |
| 11. | "Something Wicked This Way Comes" | 4:22 |
| 12. | "The Dixie Dead" | 3:32 |
| 13. | "Get Your Grave On" | 4:13 |
| 14. | "Hail Ming" | 3:47 |
| 15. | "House By The Cemetery" (Live) | 3:08 |
| 16. | "Your Mother Sucks Cocks In Hell" | 2:41 |
| 17. | "Xanaxtasy" | 4:34 |
| 18. | "It's a Wonderful Lie" | 4:13 |

Disc 2: Homesweet Demo-cide V.1.
| No. | Title | Length |
|---|---|---|
| 1. | "I Walked With a Zombie" | 1:21 |
| 2. | "Creature Feature" | 3:09 |
| 3. | "Pieces of You" | 1:31 |
| 4. | "Post Mortem Boredom" | 1:17 |
| 5. | "House By the Cemetery" | 1:38 |
| 6. | "Homicide Dr." | 3:13 |
| 7. | "I Want You Dead" | 1:30 |
| 8. | "Nothings Gonna Be Alright" | 2:26 |
| 9. | "Doomsday Afternoon" | 3:15 |
| 10. | "Bored Till Death" | 1:58 |
| 11. | "Brend New Hell (Nowhere)" | 1:33 |
| 12. | "Die Sci-Fi" | 1:38 |
| 13. | "Till Death Do Us Party" | 3:32 |
| 14. | "Lipstick" | 1:53 |
| 15. | "A Moment of Violence" | 1:48 |
| 16. | "Morgue and Mindy" | 4:11 |
| 17. | "Haddonfield" | 3:03 |
| 18. | "The Saw is Family" | 0:57 |
| 19. | "The World According To Revenge" | 1:54 |
| 20. | "My Homesweet Homicide" | 3:04 |
| 21. | "Upon This Noose" | 2:15 |
| 22. | "Motherfucker See, Motherfucker Do" | 1:22 |
| 23. | "Crawl" | 1:17 |
| 24. | "Curse of Me" | 4:00 |
| 25. | "Rubber Mask" | 1:49 |
| 26. | "Teenage Wasteoid In Babylon" | 1:57 |
| 27. | "Horror Day" | 1:28 |
| 28. | "Spider Baby Crawl" | 3:45 |

Disc 3: Homesweet Demo-cide V.2.
| No. | Title | Length |
|---|---|---|
| 1. | "Dead Carolina" | 3:08 |
| 2. | "Death Valley Superstars" | 1:34 |
| 3. | "Skeletons" | 4:43 |
| 4. | "Hello Goodbye Die" | 1:48 |
| 5. | "Rock N' Roll is All I Got" | 3:02 |
| 6. | "Nightmare Man" | 1:36 |
| 7. | "My Demise" | 4:30 |
| 8. | "Silver Bullets" | 2:02 |
| 9. | "Save The Last Grave" | 1:17 |
| 10. | "I Wanna Be Cremated" | 1:47 |
| 11. | "We All Die" | 1:28 |
| 12. | "From Here To the Hearse" | 3:37 |
| 13. | "They Always Go For the Butcher Knife" | 1:46 |
| 14. | "Something Wicked This Way Comes" | 1:58 |
| 15. | "Be My Exorcist" | 1:50 |
| 16. | "Drug Me To Hell" | 1:06 |
| 17. | "Hanging By a Thread" | 1:03 |
| 18. | "Halloween 1313" | 1:34 |
| 19. | "What Ever You Got I'm Against It" | 1:27 |
| 20. | "Blood Fades To Black" | 1:02 |
| 21. | "Creep For Life" | 1:35 |
| 22. | "The Funeral Ball" | 2:07 |
| 23. | "As the Daylight Died (Summertime Suicide)" | 4:32 |
| 24. | "Bloodsucker Motherfucker" | 1:32 |
| 25. | "Curse The Living" | 1:57 |
| 26. | "Get Your Grave On" | 1:43 |
| 27. | "Ghost Stories" | 1:50 |
| 28. | "The Dixie Dead" | 1:22 |

Disc 4: Re-Animated Resurrected
| No. | Title | Length |
|---|---|---|
| 1. | "All American Massacre" (Skull Soup Mix) | 3:23 |
| 2. | "Gimmie, Gimmie Bloodshed" (Punishment & Cookies Mix) | 3:50 |
| 3. | "No Rabbit In the Hat" (Shotgun Solution Mix) | 3:30 |
| 4. | "Put Your Death Mask On" (Meat Hooker Mix) | 2:48 |
| 5. | "Scream Baby Scream" (Ghost Boo-Ty Mix) | 3:12 |
| 6. | "Bad Things" (Suffocation Celebration Mix) | 3:39 |
| 7. | "Rambo" (Bullets & Bloodshed Mix) | 2:43 |
| 8. | "I Wanna Be Cremated" (Fun In Funeral Mix) | 3:19 |
| 9. | "Get Your Grave On" (Abra-Cadaver Mix) | 3:54 |
| 10. | "Hail Ming" (Reign In Green Blood Mix) | 3:35 |

== Personnel ==
All musicians that appear on the album

- Wednesday 13 - Composer, Instrumentation, Liner Notes, Lyricist, Primary Artist, Vocals
- Jonny Chops - drums
- Troy Doebbler - bass, background vocals
- Jamie Hoover - piano, slide guitars
- Nate Manor - bass
- Racci Shay - drums
- Roman Surman - guitar, background vocals
- Jack Tankersley - guitar, background vocals
- Jason Trioxin - guitar
- Jason "Shakes" West - drums

Additional Personnel

- Brent Clawson - Editing, Mastering
- Laume Conroy - Cover Art
- Koichi Fukuda - Remixing
- Ross Smith - Remixing
- Marlene Velasco - Design, Layout
