= From Here to the Hearse =

Compilation album by Wednesday 13
- Released: July 13, 2010
- Genre: Horror punk, heavy metal, glam metal, outlaw country
- Length: 37:32
- Label: Wednesday 13 LLC

Wednesday 13 chronology
Fuck It, We'll Do It Live (2008)	From Here to the Hearse (2010)	Re-Animated (2011)

From Here to the Hearse is a 2010 limited-edition vinyl compilation album by American musician Wednesday 13. It features material from his solo career as well as tracks from several related projects, including Bourbon Crow and Gunfire 76, along with covers originally recorded with Frankenstein Drag Queens From Planet 13.

== Background ==
The album includes studio recordings from Wednesday 13's solo career, including the previously unreleased digital single "It’s a Wonderful Lie", as well as a live recording of "197666", a song originally recorded by Frankenstein Drag Queens From Planet 13. It also features tracks from Bourbon Crow and Gunfire 76. The album artwork was created by Marlene Elizabeth, with photography by James Williams of Razorstrike.com.

== Track listing ==
Side 1

1. Gimmie Gimmie Bloodshed - 2:19 (Wednesday 13 - Skeletons)
2. From Here to the Hearse - 3:21 (Wednesday 13 - Skeletons)
3. B-Movie Babylon - 5:02 (Wednesday 13 - Bloodwork)
4. I Love to Say Fuck - 6:22 (Wednesday 13 - Bloodwork) (2007 Version)
5. Suck My Dixie - 2:11 (Bourbon Crow - Highway to Hangovers)

Side 2

1. Long Way to the Bottom - 2:54 (Bourbon Crow - Long Way to the Bottom)
2. 197666 (live) - 2:54 (Wednesday 13 - Frankenstein Drag Queens From Planet 13 cover)
3. Los Angel-Less - 4:27 (Gunfire 76 - Casualties & Tragedies)
4. One More Reason - 3:52 (Gunfire 76 - Casualties & Tragedies)
5. It's a Wonderful Lie - 4:10 (Wednesday 13 - Xanaxtasy digital single)
