= Night of the Living Drag Queens =

Studio album by Frankenstein Drag Queens from Planet 13
- Released: 1998
- Genre: Horror punk
- Length: 35:28
- Label: Uncle God Damn (USA); People Like You (Europe)

Frankenstein Drag Queens from Planet 13 chronology
The Late, Late, Late Show (1996)	Night of the Living Drag Queens (1998)	Songs from the Recently Deceased (2000)

Professional ratings
Review scores
Source	Rating
Metal Hammer	10/10

Night of the Living Drag Queens is the second full-length release by North Carolina punk band the Frankenstein Drag Queens from Planet 13. It was originally released on Uncle God Damn Records in 1998, and was later re-released on Century Media Records in collaboration with People Like You Records in 1999 as a Digi-Pack. It is also featured in the 2006 box set "Little Box of Horrors". "Twist My Sister", "Let's Go to War" and "Die My Bride" were later re-recorded for the murderdolls album Beyond the Valley of the Murderdolls

== Track listing ==
1. Mr.Motherfucker (1:55)
2. Twist My Sister (2:04)
3. Let's Go to War (2:22)
4. Die My Bride (3:14)
5. Screwdriver (1:45)
6. Scary Song (2:54)
7. Rambo (2:43)
8. I Love Me (2:11)
9. Full Metal Jackoff (2:17)
10. Crossdressing G.D.S.O.B. (1:54)
11. I Don't Wanna Be Your Friend (1:57)
12. STD's (1:13)
13. Motel Killafornia (2:19)
14. She's a Man (1:39)
15. Foot In Mouth (3:13)
16. Going to Hell (1:48)

== Album credits ==
- Wednesday 13: Guitar, Vocals
- Sydney: Guitar
- Seaweed: Bass
- Sicko Zero: Drums
