= Re-Animated (EP) =

EP / Remix album by Wednesday 13
- Released: May 10, 2011
- Genre: Horror punk, heavy metal
- Length: 16:34
- Label: Wednesday 13 LLC

Wednesday 13 chronology
From Here to the Hearse (2010)	Re-Animated (2011)	Calling All Corpses (2011)

Re-Animated is a remix album and the second EP by American horror punk musician Wednesday 13. It was released digitally on May 10, 2011.

== Background ==
The album was released in part to raise funds for earthquake relief efforts in Japan following the 2011 Tōhoku earthquake and tsunami, which Wednesday 13 experienced firsthand while touring the country with the Murderdolls.

For the first month of release a portion of all sales were donated to the American Red Cross who were supporting and advising the Japanese Red Cross Society who were assisting the government in its response at the time.

== Track listing ==
No.	Title	Length
1.	"Scream Baby Scream" (Ghost Boo-Ty Mix)	3:09
2.	"Gimmie, Gimmie Bloodshed" (Punishment & Cookies Mix)	3:49
3.	"No Rabbit In the Hat" (Shotgun Solution Mix)	3:27
4.	"Put Your Death Mask On" (Meat Hooker Mix)	2:49
5.	"All American Massacre" (Skull Soup Mix)	3:20

== Personnel ==
- Wednesday 13 - vocals, guitars
- Nate Manor - bass
- Racci Shay - drums
- Jamie Hoover - piano, slide guitars

Remixers

- Koichi Fukuda (Tracks 2 & 4)
- Ross Smith (Tracks 1, 3 & 5)

== Re-release ==
A physical release featuring the entire EP was released as part of Wednesday's Dead Meat: 10 Years of Blood, Feathers & Lipstick box set under the Disc title "Re-Animated Resurrected". This version featured 5 extra remixes. The track listing of the re-release is as follows:

1. "All American Massacre" (Skull Soup Mix) - 3:23
2. "Gimmie, Gimmie Bloodshed" (Punishment & Cookies Mix) - 3:50
3. "No Rabbit In the Hat" (Shotgun Solution Mix) - 3:30
4. "Put Your Death Mask On" (Meat Hooker Mix) - 2:48
5. "Scream Baby Scream" (Ghost Boo-Ty Mix) - 3:12
6. "Bad Things" (Suffocation Celebration Mix) - 3:39
7. "Rambo (Bullets & Bloodshed Mix) - 2:43
8. "I Wanna Be Cremated" (Fun In Funeral Mix) - 3:19
9. "Get Your Grave On" (Abra-Cadaver Mix) - 3:54
10. "Hail Ming" (Reign In Green Blood Mix) - 3:35
