= Roman Surman =

American guitarist

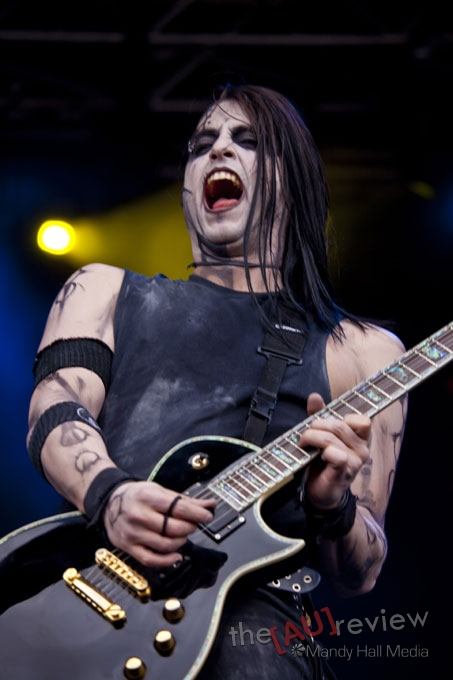
- Surman with Murderdolls in 2011.

Background information
- Genres: Heavy metal; horror punk; outlaw country; glam metal
- Occupation: Guitarist
- Years active: 2006–2024

Roman Surman is an American musician and the current lead guitarist for Wednesday 13's horror punk solo band. Surman was also a guitarist for Gunfire 76, Bourbon Crow and the second incarnation of Murderdolls, all bands fronted by Wednesday 13.

== Career history ==
Surman's long-standing partnership with Wednesday 13 began with Surman becoming a guitar-tech for his solo band. He first performed as a touring guitarist in Bourbon Crow, an Outlaw country side project he had put together in 2006. Surman was assistant editor and music composer for a short video release by Wednesday 13 called "Weirdo A-Go-Go" in 2008. In 2009 Wednesday 13 put together another side project, a glam metal band called Gunfire 76, releasing one album "Casualties and Tragedies" in October 2009. They toured the UK with "The First Blood Tour" in December of that year.

In 2010, Wednesday 13 and Joey Jordison reformed Murderdolls after an eight year hiatus, selecting a different line-up, including Surman as rhythm guitarist. He toured with the band until the second breakup in 2011. He recorded guitar tracks for their second studio album Women and Children Last. After the breakup, Wednesday 13 continued as a solo band with Surman as lead guitarist. He first appeared on 2011's Calling All Corpses and has been on every Wednesday 13 release and tour since except for the Undead Unplugged album.

He was co-credited with Wednesday 13 on five tracks on 2015's Monsters of the Universe: Come Out and Plague and had a sole writing credit for "Planet Eater: Interstellar 187", the first time a Wednesday 13 song was credited entirely to someone other than Wednesday 13, not including covers and co-credits.

== Discography ==
With Gunfire 76

- Casualties and Tragedies (2009)

With Murderdolls

- Women and Children Last (2010)

With Wednesday 13

- Calling All Corpses (2011)
- Spook and Destroy (2012)
- The Dixie Dead (2013)
- Dead Meat: 10 Years of Blood, Feathers & Lipstick (2014)
- Monsters of the Universe: Come Out and Plague (2015)
- Condolences (2017)

Necrophaze (2019) Horrifier (2022)

== Filmography ==
With Murderdolls

- Women and Children Last (Deluxe Edition DVD) (2010)

With Wednesday 13

- Weirdo A Go-Go (2008)
- Scream Britain Scream (2014)
