= The Late, Late, Late Show =

- Cover art of the reissue of The Late, Late, Late Show, taken from the 2006 European Little Box of Horrors boxset.

Studio album by Frankenstein Drag Queens from Planet 13
- Released: 1996
- Recorded: 1996
- Genre: Horror punk
- Length: 28:25
- Label: Uncle God Damn (US); People Like You (Europe)

Frankenstein Drag Queens from Planet 13 chronology
The Late, Late, Late Show (1996)	Night of the Living Drag Queens (1998)

The Late, Late, Late Show is the first full-length release by North Carolina horror themed punk band the Frankenstein Drag Queens from Planet 13. It was released on Uncle God Damn Records in 1996, and was later re-released as part of the "Little Box of Horrors" box set in 2006, on Restless Records.

== Track listing ==
1. "Blood, Feathers, Lipstick... The Monologue" – 1:00
2. "Galactic Chicken Shit" – 2:19 "(This is an early version of "Slit My Wrist", seen on Beyond the Valley of the Murderdolls)"
3. "Hit and Rape" – 2:11
4. "I Dismember Mama" – 2:52
5. "197666" – 2:26 (This song also features the vocals of the Confederate Crusader)
6. "God Damn I Am" – 3:24
7. "The Wolfman Stole my Baby" – 4:42
8. "13th Commandment" – 0:44
9. "Bloodsuckers Anyonomus" - 2:09 [sic]
10. "Kill Miss America" - 2:22
11. "Count Down...Planet 13" - 4:16
- Total Album Length: 28:25

== Album credits ==
- Wednesday 13: Guitar, Vocals (Credited as "Transvestite with chicken")
- Seaweed: Bass (Credited as "Thing holding dolls, the son of uncle god damn")
- Sicko Zero: Drums (Credited as "Galactic Whore 2")
