= Viva Las Violence =

Studio album by Frankenstein Drag Queens from Planet 13
- Released: 2001
- Genre: Horror punk
- Length: 43:19
- Labels: Uncle God Damn (USA); People Like You (Europe)

Frankenstein Drag Queens from Planet 13 chronology
Songs from the Recently Deceased (2000)	Viva Las Violence (2001)	6 Years, 6 Feet Under the Influence (2004)

Viva Las Violence is the fourth studio album of North Carolina horror-themed punk band Frankenstein Drag Queens from Planet 13. It was released on November 6, 2001, on Century Media Records, in collaboration with People Like You Records. It is featured in the 2006 box set, Little Box of Horrors.

== Track listing ==
1. "Viva Las Violence" – 2:11
2. "The Devil Made Me Do It" – 3:05
3. "Give Her to the Monsters" – 3:05
4. "Smother My Brother" – 3:12
5. "Planet of the Apes" – 2:59
6. "Evil Is Good" – 3:21
7. "We Have to Kill You" – 3:35
8. "Kung Fu You" – 2:02
9. "Murder Pie" – 4:44
10. "Eat Drugs First" – 2:58
11. "Celebrity Skinned" – 1:52
12. "Dead and Breakfast (A Night at the Sawyer's)" – 2:25
13. "Bark at the Moon" – 3:59
14. "Galactic Chicken Shit" [Live] – 3:14

Total album length: 43:19

== Album credits ==
- Wednesday 13: Guitar, Vocals (credited for "Gagging, Glitter, Guts, and Glory)
- Ikky: Guitar (credited for "Cosmetics, Chaos, Carnage, and Cadavers")
- Seaweed: Bass (credited for "Mutilations, Monsters, Mayhem and Madness")
- Scabs: Drums (credited for "Skins, Skeletons, SNots and Shocks")
