= Little Box of Horrors =

- European box art for the Little Box of Horrors

Box set by Frankenstein Drag Queens from Planet 13
- Released: May 9, 2006
- Genre: Horror punk
- Label: Restless (USA), People Like You (Europe)

Frankenstein Drag Queens from Planet 13 chronology
Wednesday 13's 6 Years, 6 Feet Under the Influence (2004)	Little Box of Horrors (2006)

Professional ratings
Review scores
Source	Rating
Brave Words & Bloody Knuckles	8/10

Little Box of Horrors is a box set released by North Carolina horror punk band Frankenstein Drag Queens from Planet 13 on May 9, 2006, on Restless Records in the USA and People Like You Records in Europe on May 29, 2006. However, the Europe version feature different artwork, and comes with an exclusive keychain, poster, and 26-page booklet, in a limited edition of 2666 and the first time The Late, Late, Late Show was reissued by People Like You. The American box art for the box set was drawn by Eric Pigors.

The box set contains all four full-length releases by the band, all with their original artwork (American version). It also contains a fifth disc, entitled Rare Treats, which features demo versions of many songs, as well as other rare songs by the band. The American release is accompanied by a DVD, entitled The Transvestite Chainsaw Massacre: Live '98, which features footage of 9 songs performed live at Ground Zero, in Spartanburg, South Carolina, in 1998.

== Track listing ==
=== Disc One ===
- See The Late, Late, Late Show

=== Disc Two ===
- See Night of the Living Drag Queens

=== Disc Three ===
- See Songs from the Recently Deceased

=== Disc Four ===
- See Viva Las Violence

=== Disc Five: Rare Treats ===
1. "Bride of Frankenstein" ('97 demo version)
2. "Whoop D God Damn Da Doo" ('97 demo version)
3. "Snotty Nose" ('97 demo version)
4. "Break Her Teeth" ('97 demo version)
5. "Natalie (You're Really Not That Cool)" ('97 demo version)
6. "Hello Hooray" ('97 demo version) (originally performed by Alice Cooper)
7. "Nobody" (acoustic radio performance, 1997)
8. "Hit and Rape" (acoustic radio performance, 1997)
9. "Kill Miss America" (acoustic radio performance, 1997)
10. "197666" (acoustic radio performance, 1997)
11. "Graverobbing USA"
12. "Rock N Roll"
13. "197666"
14. "Fox on the Run" (originally performed by Sweet)
15. "Anti-You"
16. "Dawn of the Dead"
17. "Levity Ball" (originally performed by Alice Cooper)
18. "I Wanna Be Your Dog" (originally performed by The Stooges)
19. "Shoot to Thrill" (originally performed by AC/DC)
20. "Love at First Fright"
21. "I Wanna Rot" (with alternative lyrics)

=== DVD: The Transvestite Chainsaw Massacre (USA only) ===
1. "Motel Killafornia"
2. "Mr. Motherfucker"
3. "Kill Miss America"
4. "Let's Go to War"
5. "Scary Song"
6. "Graverobbing USA"
7. "Twist My Sister"
8. "STDs"
9. "Going to Hell"

The band line-up at the time of the concert filmed for this DVD was as follows:

- Wednesday 13: vocals, lead guitar
- Seaweed: bass, vocals
- Sicko Zero: drums
- Sydney: rhythm guitar, vocals
