= 6 Years, 6 Feet Under the Influence =

Compilation album by Frankenstein Drag Queens from Planet 13
- Released: 2004
- Genre: Horror punk
- Length: 45:47
- Label: People Like You

Frankenstein Drag Queens from Planet 13 chronology
Viva Las Violence (2001)	'''6 Years, 6 Feet Under the Influence''' (2004)	Little Box of Horrors (2006)

6 Years, 6 Feet Under the Influence is the first compilation album by horror themed punk band Frankenstein Drag Queens from Planet 13. It was released on November 30, 2004, on People Like You records. All songs featured are re-recorded and tweaked from their original versions, with Wednesday 13 himself playing all instruments. This compilation also includes five new tracks and four specially recorded interludes.

== Track listing ==
No.	Title	Length
1.	"Too Dead to Die"	2:16
2.	"Evil Is Good"	3:16
3.	"Rambo"	2:25
4.	"Good Mourning Dolly"	0:42
5.	"We Have to Kill You Now"	3:27
6.	"Nightbreed"	4:43
7.	"Transmission DEAD"	0:36
8.	"Scary Song"	2:41
9.	"Rocketship Oddity 13"	3:41
10.	"Kung Fu You"	1:59
11.	"Darkside of the Tomb"	1:15
12.	"I Wanna Rot"	2:14
13.	"Chop Off My Hand"	2:27
14.	"The Wolfman Stole My Baby"	3:49
15.	"Planet of the Apes"	3:00
16.	"The Witch Is Dead"	4:08
17.	"Death Theme Thirteen"	0:32
18.	"Your Mother Sucks Cocks In Hell"	2:38
19.	"Viva Las Violence (Japan bonus track)"
20.	"The Devil Made Me Do It (Japan bonus track)"
21.	"Murder Pie (Japan bonus track)"
Total length:		45:47

== Album credits ==
=== Frankenstein Drag Queens from Planet 13 ===
- Wednesday 13: Vocals, Guitar, Bass, Keyboards, Song Introductions Performer, Music, Lyrics
- Scabs: Drums
- Jamie Hoover: Piano on "Your Mother Sucks Cocks In Hell"

=== Production ===
- Produced by Wednesday 13
- Co-produced and engineered by Jamie Hoover
