= Monsters of the Universe: Come Out and Plague =

Studio album by Wednesday 13
- Released: January 12, 2015
- Genre: Horror punk, heavy metal
- Length: 57:43
- Label: Wednesday 13 LLC

Wednesday 13 chronology
Dead Meat: 10 Years of Blood, Feathers & Lipstick (2014)	Monsters of the Universe: Come Out and Plague (2015)	Condolences (2017)

Singles from Monsters of the Universe: Come out and Plague
- 1. "Come Out and Plague" Released: October 31, 2014; 2. "Keep Watching The Skies" Released: January 2, 2015; 3. "Serpent Society" Released: January 6, 2015

Alternative covers
- Cover for the Vinyl version of the album

Monsters of the Universe: Come Out and Plague is the sixth studio album by horror punk musician Wednesday 13. It was released on January 12, 2015, in the United Kingdom and January 13, 2015, in the United States. The album is Wednesday 13's first concept album.

The album includes five tracks co-written by Wednesday 13 and Roman Surman, as well as one track written solely by Surman, marking the first time a Wednesday 13 album has featured a song written entirely by another band member.

== Background ==
Wednesday 13 discussed the album’s development in a vlog posted to DevCo Entertainment LLC’s official Vimeo channel. He stated that he wanted to pursue a more challenging project and spent approximately eight months writing material that ultimately formed a continuous narrative for the album.

Describing the concept, Wednesday 13 cited influences from the films They Live and Night of the Living Dead, as well as the television series V, characterizing the album as a science-fiction horror story distinct from his previous work.

On October 31, 2014, Wednesday 13 released the song "Come Out and Plague" via his official SoundCloud account.

== Track listing ==
All lyrics are written by Wednesday 13, except "Planet Eater: Interstellar 187" lyrics by Roman Surman.

No.	Title	Music	Length
1.	"The Fall of All"	Wednesday 13	2:40
2.	"Keep Watching the Skies"	Roman Surman; 13	4:16
3.	"Astro Psycho Galactic Blood Drive"	13	3:02
4.	"Come Out and Plague"	Surman; 13	4:25
5.	"I Ain't Got Time to Bleed"	13	5:09
6.	"Bloodline 666"	13	1:35
7.	"Serpent Society"	Surman; 13	4:24
8.	"Bombs, Guns & Gods - This Is a War"	Surman; 13	4:26
9.	"Planet Eater - Interstellar 187"	Surman	3:52
10.	"I Love Watching You Die"	13	5:00
11.	"Into the Crop Circle"	13	6:19
12.	"Over Your Dead Body"	Surman; 13	4:16
13.	"The Arrival"	13	1:59
14.	"Monsters of the Universe"	13	6:22

== Charts ==
Chart (2015)	Peak position
Australian Albums (ARIA)	95

== Personnel ==
- Wednesday 13 - lead vocals, additional guitar
- Roman Surman - lead guitar, backing vocals
- Jack Tankersley - rhythm guitar, backing vocals
- Troy Doebbler - bass, backing vocals
- Jason West - drums
