= The Dixie Dead =

Studio album by Wednesday 13
- Released: February 19, 2013
- Genre: Horror punk, heavy metal
- Length: 51:06
- Label: Wednesday 13 LLC

Wednesday 13 chronology
Spook and Destroy (2012)	The Dixie Dead (2013)	Undead Unplugged (2014)

The Dixie Dead is the fifth studio album released by horror punk musician Wednesday 13. It was released on February 19, 2013.

== Track listing ==
All tracks are written by Wednesday 13

No.	Title	Length
1.	"Death Arise (Intro)"	1:49
2.	"Blood Sucker"	4:08
3.	"Get Your Grave On"	4:12
4.	"Curse the Living"	4:29
5.	"Too Fast for Blood"	3:50
6.	"Hail Ming"	3:45
7.	"Coming Attractions"	1:07
8.	"The Dixie Dead"	3:33
9.	"Ghost Stories"	4:57
10.	"Fuck You (In Memory Of...)"	4:33
11.	"Carol Anne...They're Here"	3:41
12.	"Hands of the Ripper"	3:06
13.	"Death Arise (Overture)"	2:56

== Limited edition pre-orders ==
Limited editions of the album were available as pre-orders on Wednesday's official "Morgue Than Merch" webstore until November 13, 2012, through the Wednesday 13 web shop that contained the same track listing but different artwork and in a DVD case. Wednesday also offered fans the opportunity to have their name in the booklet.

== Personnel ==
- Wednesday 13 - lead vocals, keyboards
- Roman Surman - lead guitar, backing vocals
- Jack Tankersley - rhythm guitar, backing vocals
- Troy Doebbler - bass, backing vocals
- Jason "Shakes" West - drums
