= Calling All Corpses =

Studio album by Wednesday 13
- Released: October 11, 2011
- Genre: Horror punk, heavy metal
- Length: 44:19
- Label: Wednesday 13 LLC

Wednesday 13 chronology
Re-Animated (2011)	Calling All Corpses (2011)	Spook and Destroy (2012)

Calling All Corpses is the fourth studio album by American horror punk musician Wednesday 13. It was released on October 11, 2011.

== Track listing ==
All tracks are written by Wednesday 13.

No.	Title	Length
1.	"Blood Fades to Black (Intro)"	1:12
2.	"I Wanna Be Cremated"	4:05
3.	"Ghoul of My Dreams"	3:32
4.	"One Knife Stand"	3:31
5.	"Calling All Corpses"	2:32
6.	"Miss Morgue"	3:39
7.	"Silver Bullets"	4:20
8.	"Bad at Being Human"	4:28
9.	"London After Midnight"	3:53
10.	"Candle for the Devil"	4:26
11.	"We All Die"	3:31
12.	"Something Wicked This Way Comes"	4:19
13.	"Blood Fades to Black (Reprise) (Outro)"	1:00

== Personnel ==
- Wednesday 13 - lead vocals, rhythm guitar, keyboards
- Roman Surman - lead guitar, background vocals
- Jack Tankersley - guitar, background vocals
- Troy Doebbler - bass, background vocals
- Jason "Shakes" West - drums
- Brent Clawson - additional background vocals
