= Right to Remain Violent =

EP by Murderdolls
- Released: 2002
- Genre: Horror punk
- Length: 7:59
- Label: Roadrunner
- Producer: Matt Sepanic

Murderdolls chronology
Right to Remain Violent (2002)	Beyond the Valley of the Murderdolls (2002)

Right to Remain Violent is an EP by Murderdolls, released in 2002 on Roadrunner Records. It was released to promote their forthcoming album at the time, Beyond the Valley of the Murderdolls. The three tracks featured are the same as the versions on the full-length album.

== Track listing ==
1. "Dead in Hollywood" – 2:30
2. "Twist My Sister" – 2:06
3. "Let's Go to War" – 3:23

== Credits ==
- Wednesday 13 – vocals, bass
- Joey Jordison – guitar, bass, drums
- Tripp Eisen – lead guitar
