= Best Newcomer =

Best Newcomer is an award category. It may refer to:

- Asian Film Award for Best Newcomer
- BAFTA Award for Most Promising Newcomer to Leading Film Roles
- British Soap Award for Best Newcomer
- Empire Award for Best Female Newcomer
- Empire Award for Best Male Newcomer
- Empire Award for Best Newcomer
- Star Awards for Best Newcomer
