= Transylvania 90210: Songs of Death, Dying, and the Dead =

Studio album by Wednesday 13
- Released: April 13, 2005
- Genre: Horror punk, heavy metal
- Length: 51:12
- Label: Roadrunner
- Producer: Wednesday 13

Wednesday 13 chronology
Transylvania 90210: Songs of Death, Dying, and the Dead (2005)	Fang Bang (2006)

Singles from Transylvania 90210 Songs of Death, Dying, and the Dead
- 1. "I Walked with a Zombie" Released: 2005; 2. "Bad Things" Released: 2005

Professional ratings
Review scores
Source	Rating
AllMusic	2.5/5 stars

Transylvania 90210: Songs of Death, Dying, and the Dead is the debut studio album by American horror punk musician Wednesday 13, released on April 13, 2005, by Roadrunner Records. The album contains fourteen standard tracks, as well as a bonus track exclusive to Japan, titled "Thank You Satan". The album spawned two singles, "I Walked with a Zombie", inspired by the film of the same name, and "Bad Things", which was released only as a promo in the UK to promote the band's upcoming tour.

== Track listing ==
All tracks are written by Wednesday 13.

No.	Title	Length
1.	"Post Mortem Boredom"	0:57
2.	"Look What the Bats Dragged in"	2:32
3.	"I Walked with a Zombie"	3:43
4.	"Bad Things"	3:37
5.	"House by the Cemetery"	3:20
6.	"God is a Lie"	3:37
7.	"Haunt Me"	4:35
8.	"Transylvania 90210"	3:54
9.	"I Want You...Dead"	4:08
10.	"Buried by Christmas"	3:08
11.	"Elect Death for President"	4:23
12.	"Rot for Me"	4:03
13.	"The Ghost of Vincent Price"	5:08
14.	"A Bullet Named Christ"	4:00

Japan bonus track
No.	Title	Length
15.	"Thank You Satan"	3:56

== Personnel ==
Band members

- Wednesday 13 – vocals, guitars, bass, keyboards, samples, producer, director, audio production
- Piggy D. – backing vocals
- Kid Kid – backing vocals
- Ghastly – drums

Additional personnel

- Ziad – saxophone on "Elect Death for President"
- Monte Conner – A&R
- Jamie Hoover – engineer, audio engineer
- Colin Richardson – mixing
- Roger Lian – mastering
- Will Bartle – assistant
- P. R. Brown – art direction, design, photography
