= Women and Children Last =

Studio album by Murderdolls
- Released: August 31, 2010
- Recorded: April 2010
- Studio: Perfect Sound Studios (Hollywood, California)
- Genres: Horror punk; alternative metal
- Length: 47:35 (standard edition); 56:13 (special edition)
- Label: Roadrunner
- Producer: Chris "Zeuss" Harris

Murderdolls chronology
Beyond the Valley of the Murderdolls (2002)	Women and Children Last (2010)

Alternative cover
- Special edition

Singles from Women and Children Last...
- 1. "My Dark Place Alone" Released: June 17, 2010; 2. "Nowhere" Released: November 29, 2010

Women and Children Last is the second and final studio album by American horror punk supergroup Murderdolls released through Roadrunner Records on August 31, 2010, and produced by Chris "Zeuss" Harris. With the exception of Murderdolls touring guitarist Ramon Surman, who contributed lead guitars, and Mötley Crüe's Mick Mars, who guests on "Drug Me to Hell" and "Blood Stained Valentine", the album was recorded by Wednesday 13 and Joey Jordison. In Metal Hammer, Jordison explained why the old lineup would not be returning:

The old band, we didn’t even know each other before it all came together [...] It was dysfunctional but it worked, but this time, we wanted it to be a little more stable. It was apparent that if we were going to do the Murderdolls again, we were going to do it with everything we’ve got.

"He came in, shared a few of our bad taste jokes and recording tips," Wednesday remarked of Mick Mars. "As well as being a lovely guy, Mick is one of the villains of rock, along with Alice Cooper and Rob Zombie."

On June 17, 2010, on the Murderdolls' Facebook page, the lead single, "My Dark Place Alone", was available for full preview on Bloody-Disgusting.com. On June 22, the single was made available for free download, for 48 hours only, from the Roadrunner website. Mock film trailers were released for four of the album's non-single tracks: "Drug Me to Hell", "Summertime Suicide", "Death Valley Superstars" (never released because it was deemed "too violent"), and "Chapel of Blood".

== Alternative versions ==
=== Special edition ===
Along with the standard edition of the album, a special edition of Women and Children Last was also released on August 31, 2010. It features an additional three bonus tracks as well as a DVD of the band's first live performance in seven years.

=== Limited edition (last-aid kit) ===
This edition available only via website preorder. It features a 'last aid kit' which houses the CD/DVD combo version of the album (with autographed booklet), a t-shirt, patch, sticker, pill case and a digital download of the album. Additional bonus items are to be included but have not been announced yet. The fate of this item was uncertain as it was removed from the Roadrunner Records stock list as well as the pre-order list on Omega Order on July 5. As of July 16, the item is officially available again.

== Critical reception ==
Professional ratings
Review scores
Source	Rating
AllMusic	2.5/5 stars
AltSounds	74%
Blabbermouth.net	8/10
Kerrang!	3/5
PopMatters	7/10
Rock Sound	7/10
SoundSphere	4/5 stars
Ultimate Guitar Archive	8.8/10

James Zahn of Kik Axe gave the album 4 "axes" out of 5, praising the album's production, songwriting and recording, calling it "a step up from when we last heard from the band". He also stated that Women and Children Last is a big leap forward and described the band as "If Mötley Crüe were bitten by zombies and resurrected with instruments in-hand, they'd probably sound a lot like Murderdolls."

Mark Garnett of SoundSphere magazine also went along the same line, stating that Wednesday 13's voice is the best right now as it has been in years. He also called Jordison's drumming and guitar riffs 'phenomenal', praising his guitar works on "Summertime Suicide" and "Nowhere", calling them "heavy power-laden beasts yet catchy". Michael Melchor of 411mania.com gave the album 7.0 out of 10, concluding the album as "good" on the 411Mania Legend, and summarized his review by stating "Some of the rollicking fun and celebratory nature of giving the finger to political correctness may be missing here, but in its place is a certified direction. Great care was taken in the writing and recording of Women and Children Last to deliberately mark a point of maturation. There are times when the record takes itself a little more seriously than perhaps it should given the genre, but overall the murkier, more pessimistic feel works more often than not."

== Track listing ==
All music and lyrics written by Joey Jordison and Wednesday 13, except "Drug Me to Hell" and "Blood Stained Valentine" (written by Joey Jordison, Wednesday 13 and Mick Mars).

Standard edition
No.	Title	Length
1.	"The World According to Revenge" (intro)	1:22
2.	"Chapel of Blood"	3:09
3.	"Bored 'Til Death"	3:09
4.	"Drug Me to Hell"	2:59
5.	"Nowhere"	4:21
6.	"Summertime Suicide"	4:07
7.	"Death Valley Superstars"	3:44
8.	"My Dark Place Alone"	2:59
9.	"Blood Stained Valentine"	4:18
10.	"Pieces of You"	2:31
11.	"Homicide Drive"	3:22
12.	"Rock N Roll Is All I Got"	3:32
13.	"Nothing's Gonna Be Alright"	2:36
14.	"Whatever You Got, I'm Against It"	3:12
15.	"Hello, Goodbye, Die"	2:17
Total length:		47:35

Special edition bonus tracks
No.	Title	Length
16.	"Motherfucker See, Motherfucker Do"	2:57
17.	"The Funeral Ball"	3:43
18.	"A Moment of Violence"	1:58
Total length:		56:13

The special edition DVD contains the following:

- Main menu page loop ("My Dark Place Alone") – 2:57
- Song selection menu page loop ("Bored 'Til Death") – 3:08
- "Intro (The World According to Revenge)" (live) – 1:25
- "Chapel of Blood" (live) – 3:15
- "Twist My Sister" (live) – 3:05
- "My Dark Place Alone" (live) – 3:11
- "She Was a Teenage Zombie" (live) – 3:43
- "Die My Bride" (live) – 3:43
- "Dead in Hollywood" (live) – 3:01

== Personnel ==
All credits for Women and Children Last are adapted from the album's liner notes. Murderdolls

- Joey Jordison – guitars, bass, backing vocals, drums, percussion; Murderdolls logo & Militant M design
- Wednesday 13 – lead vocals, guitars, bass, backing vocals

Additional musicians

- Roman Surman – guitars, bass, backing vocals
- Mick Mars – lead guitar on tracks 4 and 9

Technical personnel

- Chris "Zeuss" Harris – production, engineering, mixing; guitars, bass, backing vocals
- Jason Donaghy – assistant engineer
- Jeremy Berman – drum technician
- Mike "Sully" Sullivan – production coordination
- Ted Jensen – mastering
- P. R. Brown – art direction, photography

== Charts ==
Chart performance for Women and Children Last
Chart (2010)	Peak position
Australian Albums (ARIA)	18
Austrian Albums (Ö3 Austria)	53
Belgian Albums (Ultratop Wallonia)	88
Dutch Albums (Album Top 100)	86
Finnish Albums (Suomen virallinen lista)	34
French Albums (SNEP)	67
German Albums (Offizielle Top 100)	48
Swedish Albums (Sverigetopplistan)	43
Swiss Albums (Schweizer Hitparade)	71
UK Albums (Official Charts)	33
US Billboard 200	43
