= Spook and Destroy =

Spook & Destroy

EP by Wednesday 13
- Released: October 09, 2012
- Genre: Horror punk, heavy metal
- Length: 25:45
- Label: Wednesday 13 LLC

Wednesday 13 chronology
Calling All Corpses (2011)	Spook & Destroy (2012)	The Dixie Dead (2013)

Spook & Destroy is the third extended play by American horror punk musician Wednesday 13. It was released on 9 October 2012. This EP includes 2 new songs, 3 re-recordings of existing songs from Wednesday 13 and another projects, an acoustic version of "Curse of Me" and 2 remixes.

== Track listing ==
All tracks are written by Wednesday 13

No.	Title	Length
1.	"M.F.T.W. (Mother Fuck The World)"	4:02
2.	"Halloween 13-13"	3:53
3.	"Bad Things (Re-Recording 2012)"	3:29
4.	"Rambo (Re-Recording 2012)"	2:27
5.	"Mr. Motherfucker (Re-Recording 2012)"	2:02
6.	"Curse of Me (Acoustic)"	3:36
7.	"Bad Things (Suffocation Celebration Remix)"	3:20
8.	"Rambo (Bullets And Bloodshed Remix)"	2:41

== Personnel ==
- Wednesday 13 - lead vocals, keyboards
- Roman Surman - lead guitar, background vocals
- Jack Tankersley - guitar, background vocals
- Troy Doebbler - bass, background vocals
- Jason "Shakes" West - drums
