= Wednesday 13 =

American musician (born 1976)

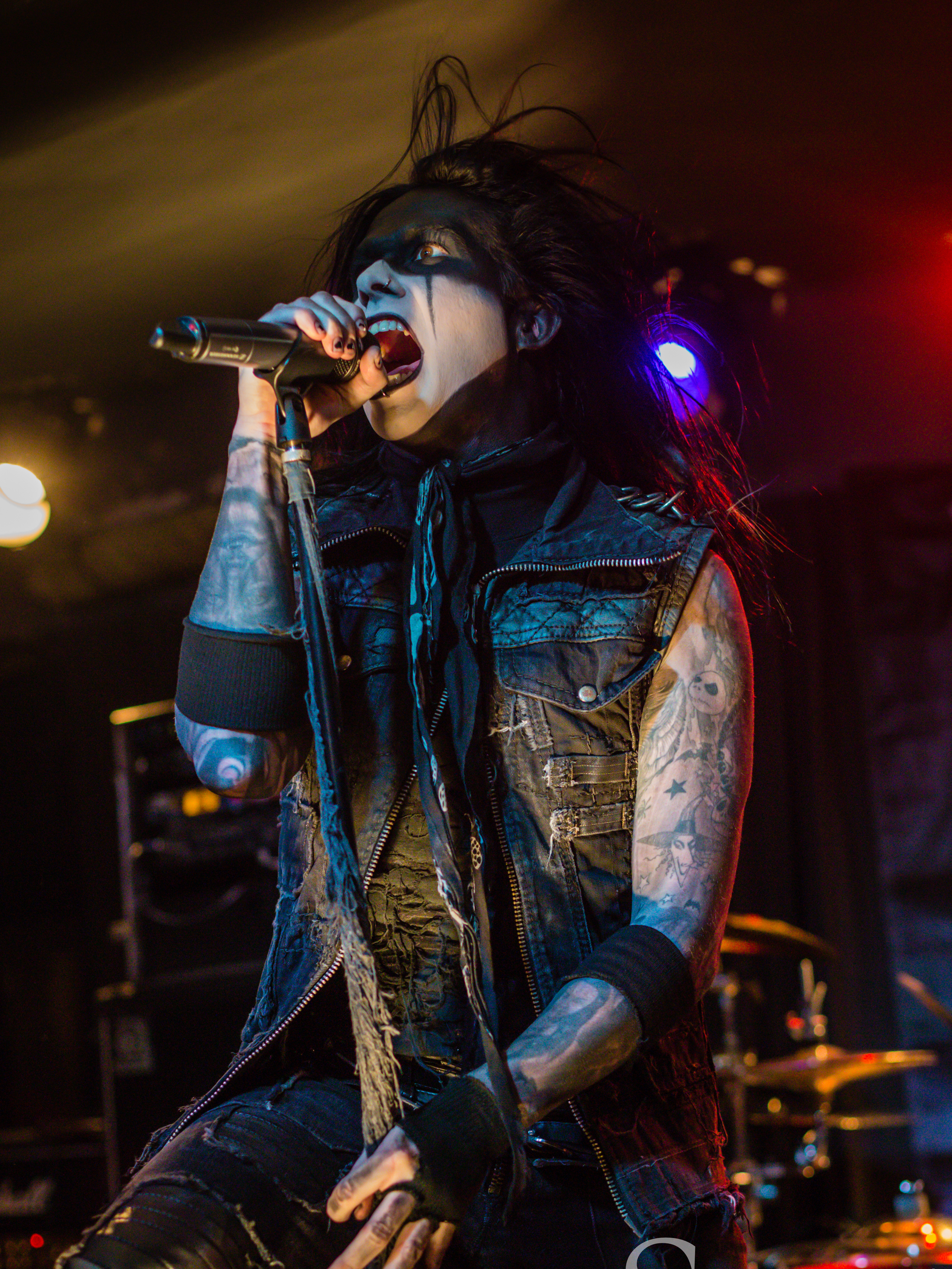
- Poole in 2013

Background information
- Also known as: Joe Nothing; Audrey 3; Mr. Motherfucker; Buck Bourbon; The Duke of Spook; Dub
- Born: Joseph Michael Poole; August 12, 1976 (age 50); Lexington, North Carolina, U.S.
- Genres: Horror punk; heavy metal; gothic metal; hardcore punk; glam metal; glam punk; outlaw country
- Instruments: Vocals; guitar; bass; keyboards
- Years active: 1992–present
- Labels: Wednesday 13 LLC; DR2; DevCo Entertainment; Rykodisc; Roadrunner; Nuclear Blast; Napalm
- Formerly of: Frankenstein Drag Queens from Planet 13; Murderdolls; Bourbon Crow; Gunfire 76; Maniac Spider Trash
- Website: officialwednesday13.com

Joseph Michael Poole (born August 12, 1976), better known by his stage name Wednesday 13, is an American singer and musician. Apart from his solo career, he was the frontman of the horror punk/glam metal band Murderdolls and has also played in several other bands, including Maniac Spider Trash, Frankenstein Drag Queens from Planet 13, Bourbon Crow, and Gunfire 76.

== Career ==
=== Psycho Opera and Maniac Spider Trash ===
Joe Poole's musical career began in 1992 when he played guitar in his first band Mizery, which was later renamed Psycho Opera. Other members included Ray Franks (guitar), Michael Patrick (bass guitar), Jeff Washam (drums), and Todd Cage (vocals). Soon after, Poole moved on to being the vocalist for Maniac Spider Trash with Ray Franks (guitar), Michael Patrick (bass guitar), and Doug McCollum (drums). Poole fronted the band from 1992 to 1996. The band released a 6-song cassette called Dumpster Mummies in 1994 under the fictitious record label, Dead/Hell Records. In 1995, the band also recorded a full-length album called Murder Happy Fairytales. The band broke up before the album saw an official release. Many years later, in 2010, Joe Poole and Ray Franks worked together for a CD release of Dumpster Mummies and a digital release of Murder Happy Fairytales.

=== Frankenstein Drag Queens from Planet 13 ===
In 1996, Joe Poole decided to leave Maniac Spider Trash behind and formed the more punk inspired Frankenstein Drag Queens from Planet 13 with Doug McCollum (drums) and Robby McGalliard (bass). With the release of the band's first album, The Late Late Late Show, the members revealed their new stage names—Wednesday 13, Sicko Zero, and Seaweed. As a 3-piece band, Wednesday 13 handled the song writing, vocals, and guitar work. In 1997, Ray Franks was invited to step in to carry the guitar duties and assumed the stage name Abby Normal. The years that followed spawned many songs that would go on to become horror punk cult classics and many performances that left audiences entertained, shocked, and bewildered. By 2002, a revolving door of band members eventually left Wednesday 13 as the only remaining original member, but not before Wednesday 13 had four studio albums and a number of singles under his belt, including contributions to tribute albums for Alice Cooper and Sweet. Because Wednesday 13 had written and produced every album by Frankenstein Drag Queens from Planet 13, he caught the attention of Joey Jordison from Slipknot. Jordison contacted Wednesday 13 about joining Murderdolls in 2002 and the following year was spent recording and touring for Beyond The Valley Of The Murderdolls. In May 2006, the Frankenstein Drag Queens From Planet 13 announced a reunion, which was followed by the release of Little Box Of Horrors, a box set of the band's complete discography. A touring line-up of Wednesday 13, Sicko Zero, and Abby Normal was assembled for a limited number of performances.

=== Murderdolls ===
Poole was contacted by Joey Jordison of Slipknot and was asked to join Jordison's new horror punk band, Murderdolls. Originally formed as a collaboration between Jordison and Tripp Eisen of Static-X and Dope, Poole became the driving force of the band after he moved from bass guitar to lead vocals. Murderdolls released one EP in 2002, Right to Remain Violent, to promote a forthcoming album the same year, Beyond the Valley of the Murderdolls. Most of the songs on the album were re-recorded versions of songs by Poole's previous band, Frankenstein Drag Queens from Planet 13. Two singles were released from the album, including a cover of Billy Idol's "White Wedding". The album reached No. 40 on the UK album chart.

On January 17, 2004 Murderdolls played their last show before going on hiatus, with Jordison returning to Slipknot. Both Poole and Jordison maintained that the band did not split up for good, and that they would return to record a second album in the future. In February 2010, while on a solo tour in Australia, Poole told Drum Media, "We're possibly going to do another Wednesday record, record it in the summer and have it out around Halloween. We're in talks right now to do another Murderdolls album. So right now I don't know which of the two is going to happen, of course if Murderdolls is possible then we have to do that, it's gotta be the number one priority. It's just talks right now. We're having the same conversations that we were having in the very beginning of the band. Right now, we're just trying to get a game plan together."

In March 2010, Jordison told Kerrang! magazine that Murderdolls had reunited to work with the producer Chris Harris. Jordison said, "It's been an ongoing conversation between Wednesday and I from 2006 until now. We were bored with everything out there, and thought we had something to piss people off and shake things up. Everything is such a product or a fucking formula these days... fuck formula! Fuck the norm!" Murderdolls released their second album, Women and Children Last, on August 31, 2010. In March 2013, Wednesday 13 announced in an interview that the Murderdolls had split up for good in 2011.

=== Wednesday 13 ===
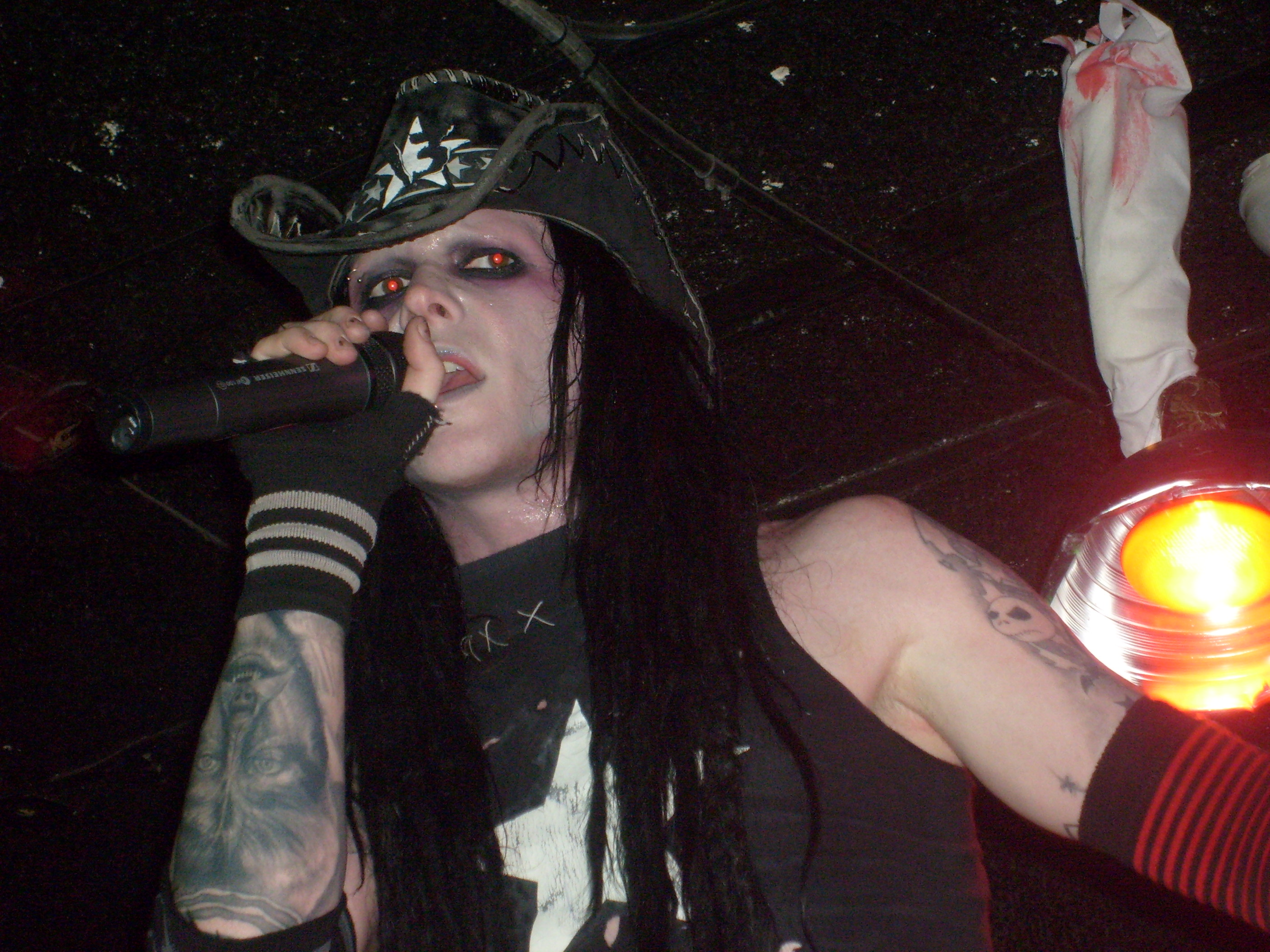
Wednesday 13 performing in 2007

After the Murderdolls went on hiatus in 2004, Poole went on a solo tour of the United Kingdom in March, called the Graveyard A Go-Go tour. For his live performances, he was joined by members of the horror punk band Death Becomes You, though this was not meant to be permanent. Poole returned to North Carolina in June 2004 and began to put together a more permanent band, with whom he would perform under the Wednesday 13 name. He brought in the former Frankenstein Drag Queens member, Ikky, on guitar. The band is heavily influenced by KISS and Alice Cooper, while not straying far from Poole's previous horror punk projects. In September 2004, Ikky was replaced by Matt Montgomery aka Piggy D.. Wednesday 13 toured Europe in November 2004 on the Look What the Bats Dragged in tour. Some of the dates were supported by the English rockers Viking Skull.

In 2005, after touring, Poole released his first solo album Transylvania 90210, and made a music video for the track "I Walked with a Zombie", depicting the band members in footage from the original Night of the Living Dead horror movie. Following the album's release, the group embarked on a tour of the United Kingdom, entitled Tour from the Crypt. Also in 2005, they played on the main stage of the Download Festival at Donington and opened some shows for Alice Cooper around Halloween.

Poole left Roadrunner Records before signing a new deal with Rykodisc, with whom he released Fang Bang on September 12, 2006. The European version of the album contains a cover of Motörhead's "R.A.M.O.N.E.S." and the Japanese edition has the same track listing as the European CD, with a bonus song entitled "Good Day to Die". The American edition has "Burn the Flames", a Roky Erickson cover, as its only bonus track. Skeletons was released in the US on April 29, 2008, available exclusively through Hot Topic locations. It was released in the UK on May 12, 2008, by DR2 Records.

On November 14, 2008, Poole released his first live album, Fuck It, We'll Do It Live. The CD/DVD package was recorded in 2008 at Crocodile Rock in Allentown, Pennsylvania. Wednesday 13 released it exclusively through Hot Topic, just as he had for Skeletons. A two-track digital download entitled Xanaxtasy was released on December 24, 2010, through iTunes. The release was announced on Wednesday 13's Facebook page on December 20, 2010, and contains two songs recorded during his 2009 sessions. Of the two songs, "Xanaxtasy" was previously released in the Bloodwork EP limited edition vinyl and "It's a Wonderful Lie" was previously released on his limited edition vinyl release From Here to the Hearse. During May 2011, Poole released a remix album/EP titled Re-Animated and announced that a portion of all sales for the first month would be donated to the American Red Cross.

On Wednesday, July 13, Wednesday released the track listing for Calling All Corpses via Bravewords. The album was released on October 11 in the US and October 10 elsewhere. He released his fifth album, The Dixie Dead, on February 19, 2013, and his sixth album, Monsters of the Universe: Come Out and Plague, on January 12, 2015.

His seventh album, Condolences, was released on June 2, 2017, after signing with Nuclear Blast. This was followed by Necrophaze on September 27, 2019.

On 7 October 2022, he released his ninth studio album, Horifier, after signing with Napalm Records.

In 2025, Wednesday 13 embarked on the No Such Thing as Monsters tour across the US, and announced a tenth studio album: Mid Death Crisis. This album was fully released on the 25th April 2025 continuing with the Napalm Records label.

On September 25, 2026 Wednesday 13 released a new live album on Napalm Records, titled 'Un-Alive from Pol'and'Rock 2025' it was recorded at the Pol'and'Rock Festival 2025 in Czaplinek-Broczyno, Poland in front of a massive crowd of over 700,000 fans.

=== Bourbon Crow ===
Since 2005, under the alias of Buck Bourbon, Poole has maintained an outlaw country side project called Bourbon Crow. Wednesday 13 was in contact with the former drummer Jeff Washam from Psycho Opera and was going to tour on the East Coast project. Scheduling prevented Washam doing the tour. The band released three albums to date:

- 2006: Highway to Hangovers
- 2009: Long Way to the Bottom
- 2015: Off the Wagon on the Rocks

=== Gunfire 76 ===
Poole teamed up with Todd Youth of The Chelsea Smiles to write and record an album with a more glam rock sound and without any horror themes, under the band name Gunfire 76. Rough mixes of the album's title track, "Casualties & Tragedies", were uploaded onto the band's Myspace page on August 12, 2009, for the fans to have an idea of what the band sounded like. The album was released on October 6, 2009. Gunfire 76 toured from December 2009 to January 2010 with Bullets and Octane on the First Blood tour.

== Personal life ==
Poole is originally from Landis, North Carolina. He has one daughter with his ex-wife Roxanne and has a granddaughter who was born in 2017.

The 2019 album Necrophaze was the first Wednesday 13 album recorded sober, according to Poole. He has maintained sobriety and continues to tour.

== Discography ==
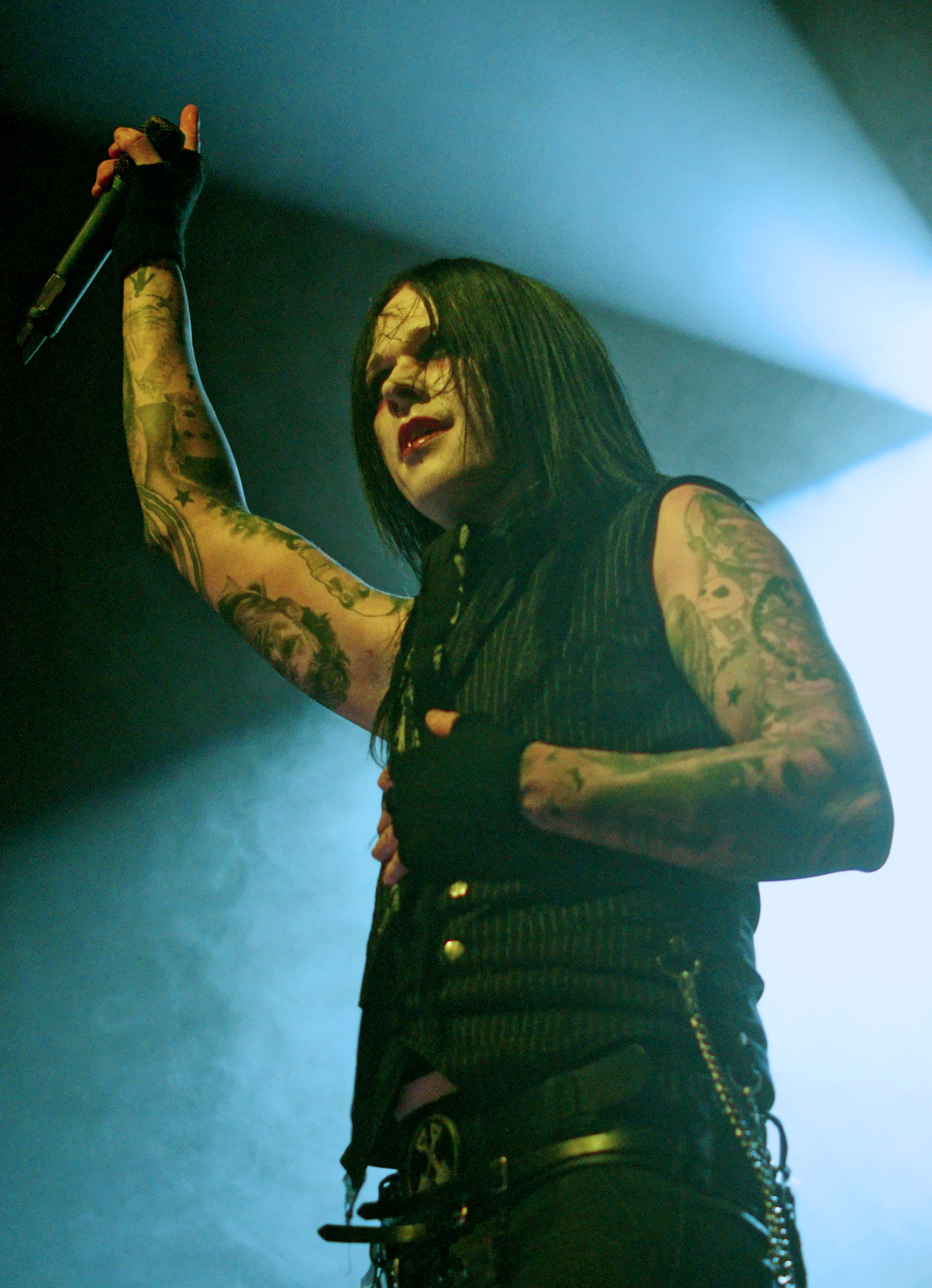
Wednesday 13 performing in 2011

=== Studio albums ===
Year	Album details	Peak chart positions	
Year	Album details	US Heat.	US Ind.
2005	Transylvania 90210: Songs of Death, Dying, and the Dead: Released: April 13, 2005; Label: Roadrunner; Formats: CD, digital	34	—
2006	Fang Bang: Released: August 29, 2006; Label: Rykodisc; Formats: CD, digital	—	—
2008	Skeletons: Released: April 29, 2008; Label: DR2; Formats: CD, digital	—	—
2011	Calling All Corpses: Released: October 11, 2011; Label: Wednesday 13 LLC; Formats: CD, digital	21	—
2013	The Dixie Dead: Released: February 19, 2013; Label: Wednesday 13 LLC; Formats: CD, digital	—	—
2015	Monsters of the Universe: Come Out and Plague: Released: January 12, 2015; Label: Wednesday 13 LLC; Formats: CD, LP, digital	25	—
2017	Condolences: Released: June 2, 2017; Label: Nuclear Blast; Formats: CD, LP, digital	7	25
2019	Necrophaze: Released: September 27, 2019; Label: Nuclear Blast; Formats: CD, LP, digital	2	—
2022	Horrifier: Released: October 7, 2022; Label: Napalm Records; Formats: CD, LP, digital	2	—
2025	Mid Death Crisis: Released: April 25, 2025; Label: Napalm Records; Formats: CD, LP, digital	—	—

=== Extended plays ===
Year	Title
2008	Bloodwork (EP): Released: April 29, 2008; Label: Wednesday 13 LLC; Formats: CD, Digital, LP
2011	Re-Animated: Released: May 10, 2011; Label: Wednesday 13 LLC; Formats: Digital
2012	Spook & Destroy: Released: October 9, 2012; Label: Wednesday 13 LLC; Formats: CD, Digital, LP
2014	Tunes from the Crypt No.1: Released: July 8, 2014; Label: Wednesday 13 LLC; Formats: LP, Digital
2021	Necrophaze – Antidote: Released: April 16, 2021; Label: Nuclear Blast; Formats: Digital

=== Compilation and live albums ===
Year	Title
2008	Fuck It, We'll Do It Live: Released: October 21, 2008; Formats: CD/DVD
2010	From Here to the Hearse: Released: July 13, 2010; Label: Wednesday 13 LLC; Formats: LP
2014	Undead Unplugged: Released: July 7, 2014; Label: Wednesday 13 LLC; Formats: CD, Digital, LP
2014	Dead Meat: 10 Years of Blood, Feathers & Lipstick: Released: July 7, 2014; Label: Wednesday 13 LLC; Formats: CD
2020	Bad Things: Released: March 13, 2020; Label: Warner Music Group; Formats: Digital
2020	The Warner Years: Released: 2020; Label: Warner Music Group; Formats: Digital
2026	Un-Alive from Pol'and'Rock 2025 • Released: September 25, 2026 • Label: Napalm Records •Formats: CD, Digital, LP

=== Singles ===
- "Bad Things" (2005)
- "I Walked with a Zombie" (2005)
- "My Home Sweet Homicide (2006)
- "From here to the Hearse (2008)
- "Xanaxtasy" (2010)
- "Scream Baby Scream (Ghost Boo-Ty Mix)" (2011)
- "Something Wicked This Way Comes" (2011)
- "Get your Grave on (2013)
- "Serpent Society" (2015)
- "Decompose" (2019)
- "Bring Your Own Blood" (2019)
- "Films" (2019)
- "Devil Inside" (2020)
- "You're so Hideous" (2022)
- "Insides Out" (2022)
- "Good Day to Be a Bad Guy" (2022)
- "When the Devil Commands" (2025)
- "In Misery" (2025)
- "No Apologies (2025)
- "Rotting Away (2025)
- "Look What the Bats Dragged in Live from Pol'and'Rock 2025" (2026)
- "I Want You Dead Live from Pol'and'Rock 2025" (2026)
- "In Misery" Live from Pol'and Rock 2025" (2026)
- "I Walked With a Zombie" Live from Pol'and Rock 2025" (2026)

== Other album appearances ==
=== Maniac Spider Trash ===
- Dumpster Mummies (1994)
- Murder Happy Fairytales (2011) (Recorded in 1995)

=== Frankenstein Drag Queens from Planet 13 ===
- The Late, Late, Late Show (1996)
- Night of the Living Drag Queens (1998)
- Songs from the Recently Deceased (2000)
- Viva Las Violence (2001)
- 6 Years, 6 Feet Under the Influence (2004)
- Little Box of Horrors (2006)

=== Murderdolls ===
- Right to Remain Violent (2002)
- Beyond the Valley of the Murderdolls (2002)
- Women and Children Last (2010)

=== Bourbon Crow ===
- Highway to Hangovers (2006)
- Long Way to the Bottom (2009)
- Off the Wagon on the Rocks (2015)
- Hungover Hits From Hell (2016)
- Dui Live From Toronto! (2018)
- Demos That Didn't Quite Make It (2019)

=== Gunfire 76 ===
- Casualties & Tragedies (Oct 6, 2009)
1. "Let's Kill the Hero"
2. "Casualties and Tragedies"
3. "Nothing's All I Need"
4. "Los Angel-less"
5. "Rocket to Nowhere"
6. "Something for the Suffering"
7. "One More Reason to Hate You"
8. "Tell You Like It Is"
9. "What Did You Expect"
10. "Back to the Gutter"
11. "Get Me Through the Night"

== Filmography ==
- Natural Born Weirdos (1998)
- Beyond the Valley of the Murderdolls Deluxe edition DVD (2002)
- Dawson's Creek S06Ep6 "Living Dead Girl" – as "The Band" (2002)
- The Transvestite Chainsaw Massacre (2006)
- Symphony for the Devil (2006) (Cameo appearance)
- Wednesday 13's Weirdo A Go-Go (2008)
- Fuck It, We'll Do It Live (2008)
- Women and Children Last Deluxe-edition DVD (2010)
- That Metal Show – "Alice Cooper/Jack Russell" (2012) (Stump the Trunk contestant)
- Scream Britain Scream (2014)
- South of Hell: 666 Days on the Road (2017)
