= Fang Bang =

Studio album by Wednesday 13
- Released: August 29, 2006
- Genre: Horror punk, glam metal
- Length: 40:26
- Label: Rykodisc

Wednesday 13 chronology
| Transylvania 90210: Songs of Death, Dying, and the Dead (2005) | Fang Bang (2006) | Bloodwork (2008) |

Singles from Fang Bang
- 1. "My Home Sweet Homicide" Released: 2006

Professional ratings
Review scores
| Source | Rating |
|---|---|
| Allmusic | 3.5/5 stars |

Fang Bang is the second studio album by American horror punk musician Wednesday 13. It was released by Rykodisc on August 29, 2006, in Europe, with a wider international release following on September 12, 2006.

== Track listing ==
All tracks are written by Wednesday 13, except "R.A.M.O.N.E.S. and "Burn the Flames".

| No. | Title | Length |
|---|---|---|
| 1. | "Morgue Than Words" | 2:37 |
| 2. | "American Werewolves in London" | 4:20 |
| 3. | "My Home Sweet Homicide" | 3:02 |
| 4. | "Faith in the Devil" | 3:30 |
| 5. | "Happily Ever Cadaver" | 3:33 |
| 6. | "Curse of Me" | 4:02 |
| 7. | "Haddonfield" | 2:59 |
| 8. | "Too Much Blood" | 2:43 |
| 9. | "Till Death Do Us Party" | 3:34 |
| 10. | "Buried with Children" | 3:42 |
| 11. | "Kill You Before You Kill Me" | 2:33 |
| 12. | "Die Sci-Fi" | 3:36 |

Bonus tracks
| No. | Title | Writer(s) | Length |
|---|---|---|---|
| 13. | "Burn the Flames" (Roky Erickson cover; North America bonus track) | Roky Erickson | 5:22 |
| 14. | "R.A.M.O.N.E.S." (Motörhead cover; Europe and Japan bonus track) | Phil Campbell, Würzel, Lemmy, Phil Taylor | 1:14 |
| 15. | "Good Day to Die" (Japan bonus track) | | 2:38 |

== Personnel ==
- Wednesday 13 – lead vocals, guitars
- Jamie Hoover – bass, additional background vocals, additional organ, additional guitars
- Ghastly – drums, percussion
- Kid Kid – background vocals

== Release history ==
| Country | Release date |
|---|---|
| Europe | August 29, 2006 |
| Worldwide | September 12, 2006 |
