= Bloodwork (EP) =

EP by Wednesday 13
- Released: April 29, 2008
- Genre: Horror punk, heavy metal
- Length: 24:35
- Label: Wednesday 13 LLC
- Producer: Wednesday 13

Wednesday 13 chronology
Fang Bang (2006)	Bloodwork (2008)	Skeletons (2008)

Bloodwork is the first EP by American horror punk musician Wednesday 13 The band struggled to come to a conclusion as to whether the EP would receive a CD release or if it would stay download only for the time being. On June 4, 2008, a decision was reached and was posted on the band's Myspace blog
"The Bloodwork EP, which is currently available for download on Itunes and Amazon, will be available for sale as a physical cd during the U.S. tour starting on July 1, 2008."
Bloodwork was sold during the US and UK 2008 tours, and though once stated to be a tour exclusive, the EP was officially released online on January 22, 2009.

The EP features six tracks, including two unreleased songs, a Tom Petty and the Heartbreakers cover, the 4th re-recording of a song by Wednesday 13's former band Frankenstein Drag Queens from Planet 13, and acoustic renditions of two songs from 13's Skeletons album, "My Demise" and "Skeletons".

When asked about the re-recording of "I Love to Say Fuck" Wednesday 13 stated that many fans could not find this track, so he recorded it to make it once again easily available to the masses.

== Track listing ==
No.	Title	Length
1.	"B-Movie Babylon"	5:02
2.	"Return of the Living Dead"	3:10
3.	"Runnin' Down a Dream" (Tom Petty cover)	3:10
4.	"I Love to Say Fuck" (2007 re-recording)	4:57
5.	"My Demise B.C."	4:12
6.	"Skeletons A.D."	4:01

== Personnel ==
- Wednesday 13 - vocals, guitars
- Nate Manor - bass
- Racci Shay - drums
- Jamie Hoover - guitars, piano
