= Murderdolls =

American rock band

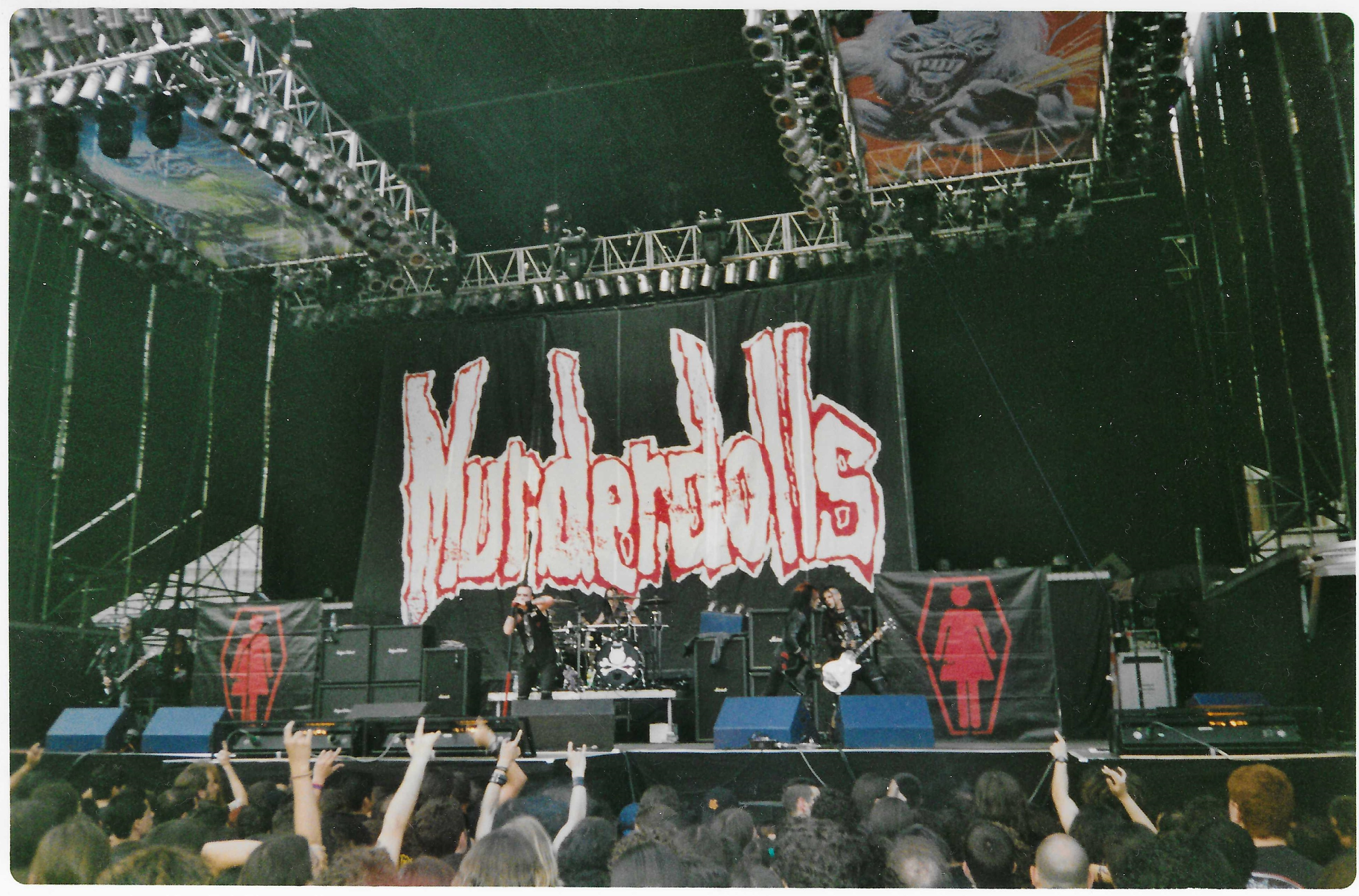
- Murderdolls performing in 2003

Background information
- Origin: Hollywood, California, U.S.
- Genres: Horror punk; glam metal
- Years active: 2002–2004; 2010–2011; 2018; 2026–present
- Label: Roadrunner
- Members: Wednesday 13; Eric Griffin; Acey Slade; Jack Tankersley; Mike Dupke
- Past members: Joey Jordison; Tripp Eisen; Ben Graves; Roman Surman; Racci Shay

Murderdolls is an American rock band formed in Hollywood, California in 2002. The band was founded by Joey Jordison, Wednesday 13, and Tripp Eisen, although the latter left soon after the recording of their debut album.

The band released two albums, the first in the form of Beyond the Valley of the Murderdolls which was released in 2002. Though the band had limited initial success in the United States, their album and singles charted well in Europe, the United Kingdom, Australia and Japan. Their second album, Women and Children Last, was released on August 31, 2010. Wednesday 13 confirmed the band's split in an interview in July 2013.

The band announced reformation on November 6, 2026.

== Characteristics ==
The sound of the band is made up of their shared influences, which musically are punk rock and as well as from some of the 1970s hard rock acts (such as Kiss and Alice Cooper). The band also share a large interest in horror movies, from which they take most of their images and references.

Lyrically, the group most often present themselves in a "tongue-in-cheek" manner, covering topics of necrophilia, grave robbing, cross-dressing, amongst other things.

The Murderdolls are often described as "Mötley Crüe meets the Misfits" by critics and fans alike.

== History ==
=== Early years ===
Some fans consider the Murderdolls history to go back as far as 1994 to a Des Moines, Iowa-based band Joey Jordison played in, named The Rejects, which was fronted by vocalist Dizzy Draztik. The sound of the band was somewhat comparable to what the Murderdolls would later develop, minus the horror themed lyrics.

The Rejects temporarily split up in 1995 as Jordison was invited to join Slipknot (then known as The Pale Ones), but reuinited in 1997, featuring his Slipknot bandmates Corey Taylor and Paul Gray on guitar and bass respectively. The band would ultimately part ways once again in 1998 once Slipknot was signed to Roadrunner Records.

During the 1999 Ozzfest tour, Jordison met Tripp Eisen and asked him if he was interested in a project he had in mind, the reforming of the Rejects with Draztik. Eisen agreed to join the project and a friend of his from the band Dope and previously the Genitorturers, Racci Shay played drums with them. Also a bassist named Ian Wiseman, who had played in New York based band the Vampire Love Dolls (fronted by Acey Slade who was known as J at the time), played with them live.

=== Formation, Beyond the Valley of the Murderdolls (2001–2002) ===
Dizzy Draztik introduced Joey Jordison to the music of the Frankenstein Drag Queens from Planet 13, a horror punk band from Charlotte, North Carolina, fronted by vocalist Wednesday 13. Draztik persuaded the band to invite the Drag Queens frontman to play with the Rejects. The pair had previously considered bringing Wednesday 13 into the band before Eisen joined. Wednesday joined them in November 2001, where he was brought into the Rejects as a bassist. Tripp Eisen has claimed that he suggested that his friend Acey Slade was brought into the band around this time, but was turned down.

Soon, Wednesday 13 was moved to the frontman position after Dizzy left the band to take care of his ailing mother. The band changed their name to the Murderdolls and would soon adopt a horror themed approach. In fact, in terms of material used Wednesday 13 became the driving force for it. Most of the tracks on the Murderdolls debut album were re-recordings from his previous band Frankenstein Drag Queens from Planet 13. These re-recordings which would later introduce a whole new audience to the past music of Wednesday 13.

Wednesday 13, Jordison and Eisen went into the recording studio to record a demo consisting on an albums worth of material. This demo ended up becoming the band's first album. Because of the association of Eisen and Jordison's other bands, was to be released on Roadrunner Records. Primarily the recording features Wednesday 13 and Joey Jordison playing all of the instruments and vocals, however Eisen recorded some of the guitar solos on it.

Around this time in late March 2002, Ben “The Ghoul” Graves and Eric Griffin, two musicians native of Boston, Massachusetts but were living in Hollywood, California at the time joined the Murderdolls. They were brought in after Eisen showed Jordison a video of himself jamming with the pair, they decided the duo would be right for the band. And although they would feature on the debut album artwork, they did not actually play on the album itself. The band played their first show together as the Murderdolls on July 30, 2002, at San Diego's Epicenter club.

An EP was released in early 2002 named Right to Remain Violent and featured some tracks from the forthcoming album. The full-length album soon followed, titled Beyond the Valley of the Murderdolls. The initial release featured fifteen tracks; twelve in total had previously been recorded by Wednesday 13 with Frankenstein Drag Queens from Planet 13 and one from his earlier band Maniac Spider Trash. 13 did however write all of the aforementioned tracks himself.

The song "Welcome to the Strange" was featured on the soundtrack for the movie Freddy vs. Jason. This track was later available as a bonus track on an expanded release of the debut album along with the single White Wedding; a Billy Idol cover.

Upon its release the Murderdolls album was promoted to the public as the "other band" of Joey Jordison, the drummer of Slipknot, or a "collaboration" between Jordison and Tripp Eisen. At the time Wednesday 13's importance as songwriter wasn't known by the public. The lead single from the album was titled "Dead in Hollywood", the promotional video featured a guest appearance by Marilyn Manson, who had previously become friends with Jordison and was returning the favor of him earlier appearing in the video for "Tainted Love".

In July 2002 Eisen announced he was leaving the band and returning to his main band Static-X as they were due to record a new album at the time. Eisen's former Dope bandmate Acey Slade was brought in to replace him on guitar.

=== Touring (2002–2004) ===
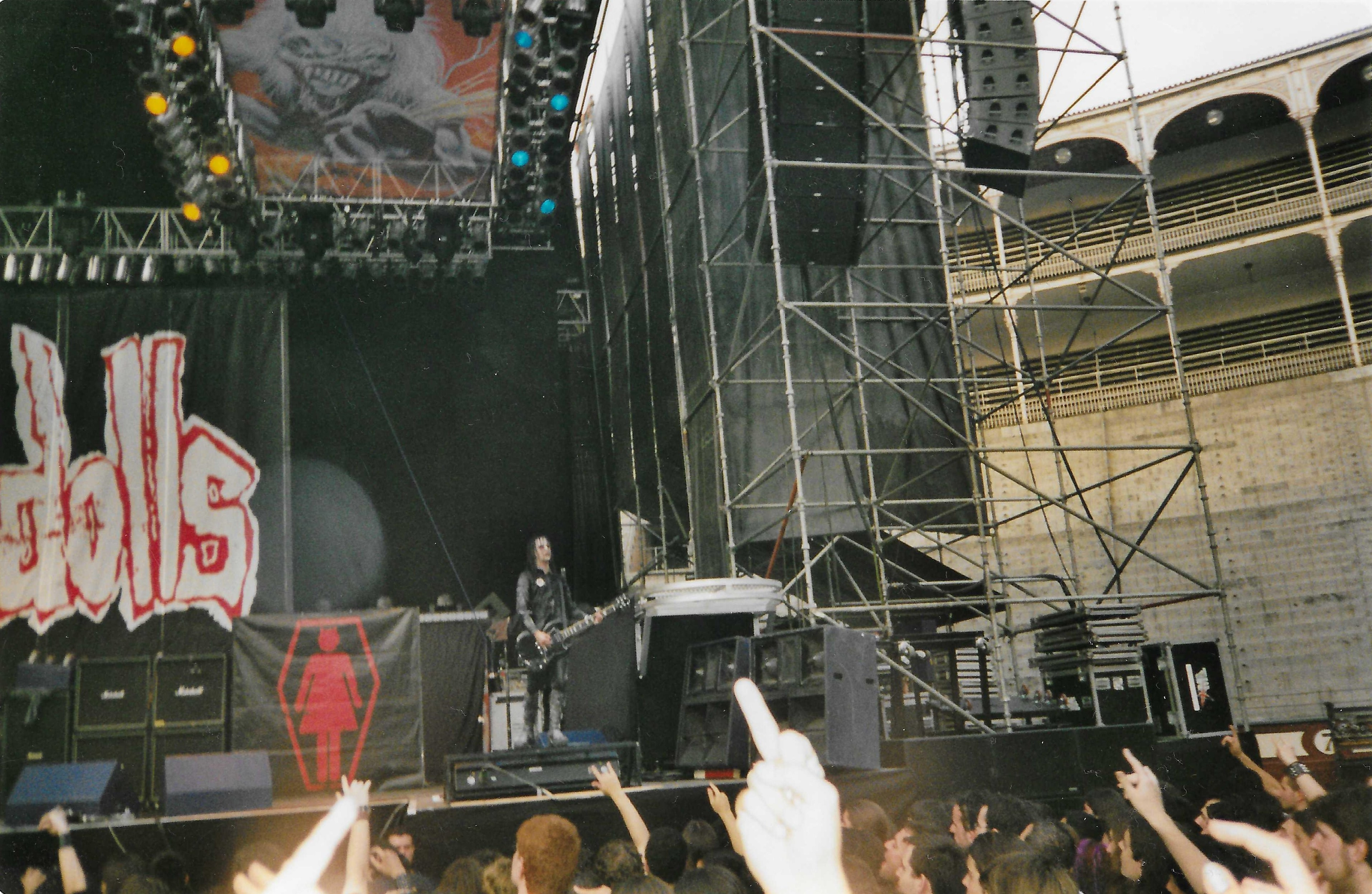
Jordison playing guitar with Murderdolls, June 12, 2003, Madrid, Spain

The first tour dates of the Beyond the Valley of the Murderdolls World Tour took the band through parts of the United States including; Los Angeles, Detroit, Chicago and Jordison's native Iowa. Their first major date was at the Summer Sonic Festival in Tokyo, Japan during August 18, 2002, two days before their debut album was released. This helped them gain a fan base in Japan.

Following this they played some dates in Europe, including a tour of the United Kingdom with AntiProduct (the lead singer of which, Alex Kane, briefly replaced Griffin on bass when he had to return home during the tour) and Ireland.

Their restless touring continued throughout 2002 into 2003, where they played in several major festivals; first, they played at the Australian festival Big Day Out, going on after Queens of the Stone Age and Foo Fighters headlined the event. They were received favorably and one reviewer commented on the band's performance as a "mangled, choked and psychotic version of the Sex Pistols." The other major festival dates during this time were Download Festival and Rock am Ring, Iron Maiden headlined both of the festivals.

Together, the band recorded a cover version of Billy Idol's "White Wedding". A promotional video was recorded for it, in which they mocked popstar singing contests such as the Idol series. It was released as a single in the United Kingdom and they even performed it on the UK chart show Top of the Pops.

Mid-2003, the Murderdolls co-headlined a tour of England with fellow Roadrunner Records band Stone Sour, which contained two of Jordison's fellow members of Slipknot, Corey Taylor and James Root.

Murderdolls toured at the end of 2003 in support of the single and the re-release of their debut, which included their Billy Idol cover as well as five other bonus tracks and b-sides: "Let's Fuck'", "I Take Drugs", "Crash Crash", "Welcome to the Strange" and "I Love to Say Fuck". The latter two had previously been recorded by Wednesday 13 with the Frankenstein Drag Queens from Planet 13. The tour went through a number of European countries including Spain, Italy, Croatia, and Scandinavian countries before ending with a four date tour of the UK supported by English psychobilly band Eighties Matchbox B-Line Disaster.

Murderdolls played their last show on January 17, 2004, in Corona, California. After this they went on an indefinite hiatus with Jordison returning to Slipknot. Since the hiatus begun, both Wednesday 13 and Jordison maintained that the band had not split up for good, and that they would return to record a second album together in the future. Additionally, in a 2009 interview, Slade revealed that he would have been happy to reform the Murderdolls by now, but it always proves impossible due to other commitments of the band members.

=== Reunion, Women and Children Last and breakup (2010–2011) ===
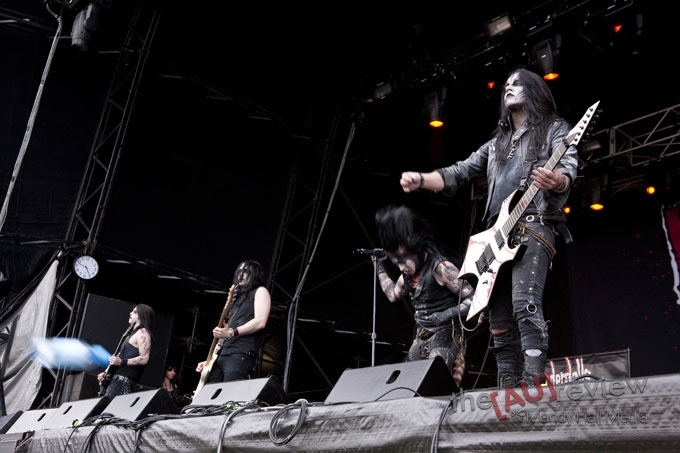
Murderdolls performing in 2011.

In February 2010, whilst embarking on a solo tour in Australia, Wednesday 13 spoke with Drum Media and told them he was tossing up whether to record another solo album or record another Murderdolls album. He stated that the idea was still in talks, but would be his number one priority if the opportunity arose.

In March 2010, Jordison officially revealed to Kerrang! magazine that Murderdolls had officially reunited with him and Wednesday working with producer Chris "Zeuss" Harris. Jordison said about the reunion, "It's been an ongoing conversation between Wednesday and I from 2006 until now. We were bored with everything out there, and thought we had something to piss people off and shake things up. Everything is such a product or a fucking formula these days... Fuck formula! Fuck the norm!"

It was revealed on the band's official website that the band would feature a new lineup without Slade, Griffin or Graves. Drummer Racci Shay joined the band alongside guitarist Roman Surman and bassist Jack Tankersley.

Mötley Crüe guitarist Mick Mars recorded a guest appearance on the new album, whilst he was recording material for his debut solo album in the same space. On April 15, the band confirmed that they had finished recording their upcoming album Women and Children Last. Joey Jordison has said that he considers Women and Children Last as really the first true Murderdolls album.

The band was expected to embark on a tour of North America, but the idea was scrapped after Jordison began touring with Rob Zombie on the Hellbilly Deluxe 2 World Tour and after the untimely death of his Slipknot bandmate Paul Gray. This led to the band performing only two shows in California in mid-June to promote their new album. The first show was captured on video and was released on DVD for the special edition of the album. Jordison resumed touring with Zombie in early July.

For Women and Children Last, Jordison and Wednesday 13 confessed to VerdamMnis Magazine that they consider this new release to be their very first album, as this is the first time they "sat down together to write songs and the production is a far better than from Beyond the Valley of the Murderdolls. They also revealed to the magazine that the CD was recorded in a mansion upon the Hollywood Hills, which encouraged them "to create their own sound with no influence from the outside world", as they were secluded.

The album was released on August 31, 2010, through Roadrunner Records.

The band promoted the album on the Women & Children Last World Tour, on which they supported Guns N' Roses on a handful of European dates, performed on the main stage at the UK edition of the Ozzfest, supported Rob Zombie and Alice Cooper on the Halloween Hootenanny Tour (Jordison performed double duty with Zombie and the Murderdolls), and performed on Fuel TV's The Daily Habit. The band was expected to embark upon a headlining tour of North America in December, followed by a tour of the United Kingdom in January, before returning to Australia for the first time in 8 years to co-headline the Soundwave Festival.

The band announced that, along with their North America tour, Violent Night, Deadly Night Tour, they were releasing a music video for the song "Nowhere" from Women and Children Last on November 29, 2010. However, On November 29, 2010, it was announced that the Violent Night, Deadly Night Tour was canceled, due to family issues.

The last time the Murderdolls performed together was April 24, 2011. This final gig marked the last time Joey and 13 spoke for five years. In March 2013, Wednesday 13 announced in an interview that the Murderdolls had split for good in 2011.

=== Post-breakup ===
In 2017, Wednesday 13 stated his interest in resurrecting the Murderdolls, and that Joey may also be interested. Further speculation came in July 2018 when Jordison claimed new material was ready to go and a reunion could happen when the time was right. However, in a February 2019 interview, Wednesday 13 stated that no progress on a reunion had occurred and that Joey and he were still friends.

On May 9, 2018, former drummer Ben "The Ghoul" Graves died of cancer at the age of 45. Wednesday 13, along with former members Eric Griffin and Acey Slade performed with each other for the first time in 14 years to pay tribute to their late drummer.

On July 26, 2021, Joey Jordison died at the age of 46.

=== Reunion ===
On November 6, 2026, Wednesday 13 and Joey Jordison's estate announced that Murderdolls would be performing at the "Graspop Metal Meeting" in 2027 to coincide with the 25th anniversary of Beyond the Valley of the Murderdolls. This reunion has been confirmed to feature former members Wednesday 13, Eric Griffin, Acey Slade and Jack Tankersley along with Wednesday 13 solo band member Mike Dupke filling in for Ben Graves on drums. As well as Graspop Metal Meeting, the band has been announced as a part of Download Festival's 2027 lineup.

== Band members ==
=== Current members ===
- Wednesday 13 – lead vocals, studio guitars and bass (2002–2004, 2010–2011, 2018, 2026–present)
- Eric Griffin – guitar (2026–present), bass, backing vocals (2002–2004, 2018)
- Acey Slade – guitars, backing vocals (2002–2004, 2018, 2026–present)
- Jack Tankersley – bass (2026–present, touring 2010–2011)
- Mike Dupke – drums (2026–present)

=== Former members ===
- Joey Jordison – guitar, backing vocals, studio drums, percussion, bass, keyboards and piano (2002–2004, 2010–2011; died 2021)
- Tripp Eisen – guitars, backing vocals (2002)
- Ben “The Ghoul” Graves – drums (2002–2004; died 2018)

=== Former touring members ===
- Alex Kane – bass (2002; substitute for Eric Griffin), guitar (2018)
- Roman Surman – guitar, backing vocals, studio bass (2010–2011)
- Racci Shay Hart – drums (2010–2011)
- Jason West – drums (2011)
- Johnny Kelly – drums (2018)

== Discography ==
Studio albums

- Beyond the Valley of the Murderdolls (2002)
- Women and Children Last (2010)

== Accolades ==
Revolver Golden Gods

| Year | Nominee / work | Award | Result |
|---|---|---|---|
| 2011 | Murderdolls | Comeback of the Year | Won |

Metal Hammer Golden Gods Awards

| Year | Nominee / work | Award | Result |
|---|---|---|---|
| 2003 | Murderdolls | Best Newcomer | Won |

Kerrang! Awards

| Year | Nominee / work | Award | Result |
|---|---|---|---|
| 2003 | White Wedding | Best Video | Nominated |
| 2003 | Murderdolls | Best Live Act | Nominated |
