= Beyond the Valley of the Murderdolls =

Studio album by Murderdolls
- Released: August 20, 2002
- Genre: Horror punk
- Length: 46:31
- Label: Roadrunner
- Producers: Joey Jordison; Matt Sepanic (co.)

Murderdolls chronology
Right to Remain Violent (2002)	Beyond the Valley of the Murderdolls (2002)	Women and Children Last (2010)

Singles from Beyond the Valley of the Murderdolls
- 1. "Dead in Hollywood" Released: 2002; 2. "White Wedding" Released: 2003

Alternative cover
- Limited edition cover (2003)

Professional ratings
Review scores
Source	Rating
AllMusic	3/5 stars

Beyond the Valley of the Murderdolls is the debut studio album by American horror punk supergroup Murderdolls. It was released in 2002 by Roadrunner Records. The album reached number 40 on the UK Albums Chart, and sold 100,000 copies in the U.S.

The original pressing of the album featured 15 tracks, with a later re-release containing six additional bonus tracks.

== Previously recorded versions ==
Most of the songs on the album came from Wednesday 13's previous bands Maniac Spider Trash and Frankenstein Drag Queens From Planet 13, as well as Joey Jordison's previous band The Rejects.

== Track listing ==
All tracks are written by J. Jordison and J. Poole, except "White Wedding", written by Billy Idol.

Beyond the Valley of the Murderdolls track listing
No.	Title	Length
1.	"Slit My Wrist"	3:44
2.	"Twist My Sister"	2:06
3.	"Dead in Hollywood"	2:30
4.	"Love at First Fright"	3:02
5.	"People Hate Me"	4:46
6.	"She Was a Teenage Zombie"	2:57
7.	"Die My Bride"	3:10
8.	"Graverobbing U.S.A."	3:21
9.	"197666"	2:19
10.	"Dawn of the Dead"	3:43
11.	"Let's Go to War"	3:23
12.	"Dressed to Depress"	2:13
13.	"Kill Miss America"	2:27
14.	"B-Movie Scream Queen"	3:49
15.	"Motherfucker, I Don't Care"	2:57
Total length:		46:31

Re-release bonus tracks
No.	Title	Length
16.	"Crash Crash"	3:11
17.	"Let's Fuck"	1:25
18.	"I Take Drugs"	1:44
19.	"White Wedding" (Billy Idol cover)	3:16
20.	"Welcome to the Strange"	4:19
21.	"I Love to Say Fuck"	4:29

Enhanced DVD
No.	Title	Length
1.	"I Love to Say Fuck" (live)	3:13
2.	"Dead in Hollywood"	1:24
3.	"Love at First Fright"	1:43
4.	"White Wedding" (Billy Idol cover)	3:54

== Personnel ==
All credits for Beyond The Valley of The Murderdolls are adapted from the album's liner notes.

Murderdolls

- Wednesday 13 – lead vocals
- Joey Jordison – lead & rhythm guitar, bass, drums, percussion, keyboard, piano, backing vocals; production, mixing
- Tripp Eisen – rhythm and lead guitar, backing vocals

Production

- Matt Sepainc – mixing, co-production, recording, engineering
- Sean McMahon – recording, engineering (tracks 6 & 12)
- Ted Jensen – mastering
- Paul Brown – art direction, design, photography
- Corey Brennan – management
- Monte Conner – A&R
- Catriona Gray – additional object photography

== Charts ==
Chart performance for Beyond the Valley of the Murderdolls
Chart (2002)	Peak position
French Albums (SNEP)	144
German Albums (Offizielle Top 100)	84
UK Albums (Official Charts)	40
US Billboard 200	102

== Certifications ==
Certifications for Beyond The Valley Of The Murderdolls
Region	Certification	Certified units/sales
United Kingdom (BPI)	Silver	60,000^{^}
^{*} Sales figures based on certification alone.^{^} Shipments figures based on certification alone.
