= Frankenstein Drag Queens from Planet 13 =

American horror punk band

Frankenstein Drag Queens
- Origin: Landis, North Carolina, U.S.
- Genres: Horror punk, glam punk
- Years active: 1996–2002; 2004–2005
- Labels: Uncle God Damn Records; People Like You Records; Restless Records
- Past members: Wednesday 13; Abby Normal; Sicko Zero; Seaweed; Rat Bastard; Scabs; R.S. Saidso; Creepy; Syd; Ikky; It

Frankenstein Drag Queens from Planet 13 was an American horror punk band from North Carolina. The band was formed in 1996 by Wednesday 13, who recruited friends and former Maniac Spider Trash bandmates Seaweed and Sicko Zero. The band's history is riddled with a 'revolving door' lineup with 13 being the only member to have never been replaced.

After breaking up in 2001 when Wednesday 13 left to perform vocals with the Murderdolls, the band reformed for a brief reunion in 2005, releasing a box set containing their entire library of recordings except for the track "Hey Mom I Just Killed A Chicken" because Wednesday 13's master copy was "destroyed beyond repair". This track is exclusively available on the 197666 7-inch LP and the band-released "Chop Off My Hand" CD-R.

The music of the Frankenstein Drag Queens was played in a punk rock style. Lyrically the band were inspired by horror B-movies and references in popular culture. As well as a large leaning towards punk, the band's live show and appearance took cues from glam rock acts such as Alice Cooper, New York Dolls and Kiss. They were known to wear dresses and make-up on stage as part of their performance.

== Biography ==
=== 1996 ===
The band wrote their debut album The Late, Late, Late Show within two weeks of being together, and recorded it in two days. The album contained 11 tracks of nihilistic but trashy horror punk tracks. This would be the blueprint for their future recordings. Lyrically the album featured songs about killing Miss America, religion, and rape, and horror movie themes such as a song mentioning the Wolf Man.

By the end of 1996, 13 fired Seaweed from the band and Rat Bastard took his place. Soon after, Sicko Zero quit the band, 13 lost contact with Rat Bastard, and the band folded.

=== 1997–1998 ===
The following year, in 1997, the Frankenstein Drag Queens from Planet 13 reformed. Seaweed returned to the lineup and brought a guitarist named Creepy and a drummer named Scabs with him. However, the latter two only remained with the band for two weeks.

Abby Normal, previously of Maniac Spider Trash, and drummer R.S. Saidso joined the band. Along with 13, the 3 recorded and along with Saidso, 13 co-produced the Frankenstein Drag Queens cassette-released demo EP. This cassette was sent to record labels and sold at live shows with a free FDQ sticker.

Syd replaced Abby Normal the same year on guitar and after a tour-related inter-band conflict R.S. Saidso played his final show New Year's Eve December 31, 1997. He had announced already it would be his last show with the Draq Queens. Saidso went on to record some demos under the name Dragster "66" with Abby Normal. Shortly after that he formed Electra-Kill in Paris, France, where he moved to vocals.

In 1998 original drummer Sicko Zero rejoined and the band set to record their second album, Night of the Living Drag Queens.

This album and the one previously recorded were released via the band's own label Uncle God Damn Records and were made available by mail order and at their gigs.

After touring in support of the album, guitarist Sydney left the band. 13 then decided to keep the band a trio which ironically had returned to its original form with Wednesday 13 on guitar and vocals, Sicko Zero playing the drums, and Seaweed on bass guitar.

=== 1999 ===
The trio went into the studio and recorded their third album, Songs From the Recently Deceased. This was, in comparison to their previous recordings, a far more horror-themed album.

Also during this time three 7-inch limited singles were released. The first, commonly referred to by fans as "Hello Horray", a split with the Spook, was released in both Germany and the USA. Each release featured a different front cover and the US edition came with a sticker. Also released the same year was 197666, limited to 500 copies and containing the rarely heard track "Hey Mom I Just Killed a Chicken".

=== 2000 ===
After playing in support of the Songs From the Recently Deceased album, the band secured a European record deal with People Like You Records (which is backed by Century Media Records). The company re-released digipack versions of both Night of the Living Drag Queens and Songs From the Recently Deceased.

During this time keyboardist Ikky was brought into the band, but Sicko Zero was uncomfortable with this and he soon left for the second time.

=== Viva Las Violence ===
During 2001, Scabs the drummer, who replaced Zero the first time around in 1997, was brought into the band to replace him once more. Although the band still wore make-up during this period, they removed their wigs and began to adopt an image which would later be seen in the Murderdolls.

The Frankenstein Drag Queens From Planet 13 recorded their fourth album, Viva Las Violence. This time the sound was more hard rock-centered, but with some shades of their Night of the Living Drag Queens album remaining. Seaweed recorded some tracks on the album but had left by the time it was released. A local young bassist named JaCkY Boi replaced him and finished the tracking.

In support of the album, the band played many shows, and recorded some songs which would later appear on a Greatest Hits compilation. The band played their last show in Atlanta, Georgia during early 2002 and were disbanded by leader Wednesday 13.

=== Wednesday 13 joins the Murderdolls ===
13 had been asked to join a band named the Rejects by two musicians from Des Moines, Iowa named Dizzy Draztik and Joey Jordison, the latter of which played in Slipknot. 13 felt that after six years and four albums, the Frankenstein Drag Queens were not garnering much success and wanted to try a new project.

In November 2001 Wednesday 13 joined the Rejects as a bassist. By 2002, Draztik was out of the band, 13 was the frontman and they had a new name, the Murderdolls. 13 would use many Frankenstein Drag Queens From Planet 13 songs on the Murderdolls debut album Beyond the Valley of the Murderdolls. This would cause relationships to fray between 13 and former members of the Drag Queens, who had formed a new band themselves, the Graveyard Boulevard.

With the Murderdolls, 13 toured the world and played several high key festival dates such as Summer Sonic Festival, Download Festival, and Rock am Ring, playing with bands such as Iron Maiden, Queens of the Stone Age, Foo Fighters, and many more.

After Murderdolls went on hiatus, Wednesday 13 put out a new song, "Your Mother Sucks Cocks in Hell", on a compilation album for Metal Sludge. He then released a greatest hits album under the name Wednesday 13's Frankenstein Drag Queens, featuring a few new songs. The frontman then decided to put the band to rest and began to record under the Wednesday 13 name.

=== Frankenstein Drag Queens reformation ===
Shortly after this, 13 and his former bandmates in the Graveyard Boulevard patched up old feuds (with the exception of Seaweed) and decided to bring the Frankenstein Drag Queens back as a part-time project. They officially reunited onstage in Greensboro, North Carolina on August 20, 2005. The lineup featured Wednesday 13, Abby Normal, and Sicko Zero.

They released a 10th anniversary box set in May 2006 titled Little Box of Horrors. The box set features almost every song the band has ever recorded, with alternate versions of some songs, and a DVD which features footage from a 1998 concert. It was released on Restless Records.

== Members ==
Former members

- Wednesday 13 – vocals, guitars (1996–2002, 2005)
- Sicko Zero – drums (1996, 1997–2000, 2005)
- Seaweed – bass (1996, 1997–2001)
- Rat Bastard – bass (1996)
- Scabs – drums (1997, 2001–2002) (died 2016)
- R.S. Saidso – drums (1997)
- Creepy – guitar (1997)
- Syd – guitar (1997–1998)
- Ikky – keyboards (2000), guitars (2001–2002)
- JaCkY Boi – bass (2001)
- It – bass (2001–2002)
- Abby Normal – bass (2005), guitar (1997)

== Discography ==
=== Albums ===
- "The Late, Late, Late Show" – (1996)
- "Night of the Living Drag Queens" – (1998)
- "Songs from the Recently Deceased" – (2000)
- "Viva Las Violence" – (2001)

=== EP ===
- "Frankenstein Drag Queens from Planet 13" – (1997)

=== Singles ===
- "197666 / Hey Mom, I Just Killed a Chicken" – (2000)
- "Dawn of the Dead / Anti-You" - Split with The Nerds – (2000)
- "Hello Hooray / Kill Miss America" - Split with The Spook
- "Graverobbing U.S.A. / Rock n' Roll"
- "Chop Off My Hand / Hey Mom, I Just Killed a Chicken"
- "Love At First Fright / I Wanna Be Your Dog"

=== Boxset and compilation ===
- "6 Years, 6 Feet Under the Influence" – (2004)
- "Little Box of Horrors" – (2006)

=== Tribute appearances ===
- "Sweet F.A, A Tribute to Sweet" (featuring cover of "Fox on the Run")
- "Thinking of Alice, A Tribute to Alice Cooper" (featuring cover of "Levity Ball")
