= List of awards and nominations received by Slipknot =

Slipknot awards and nominations
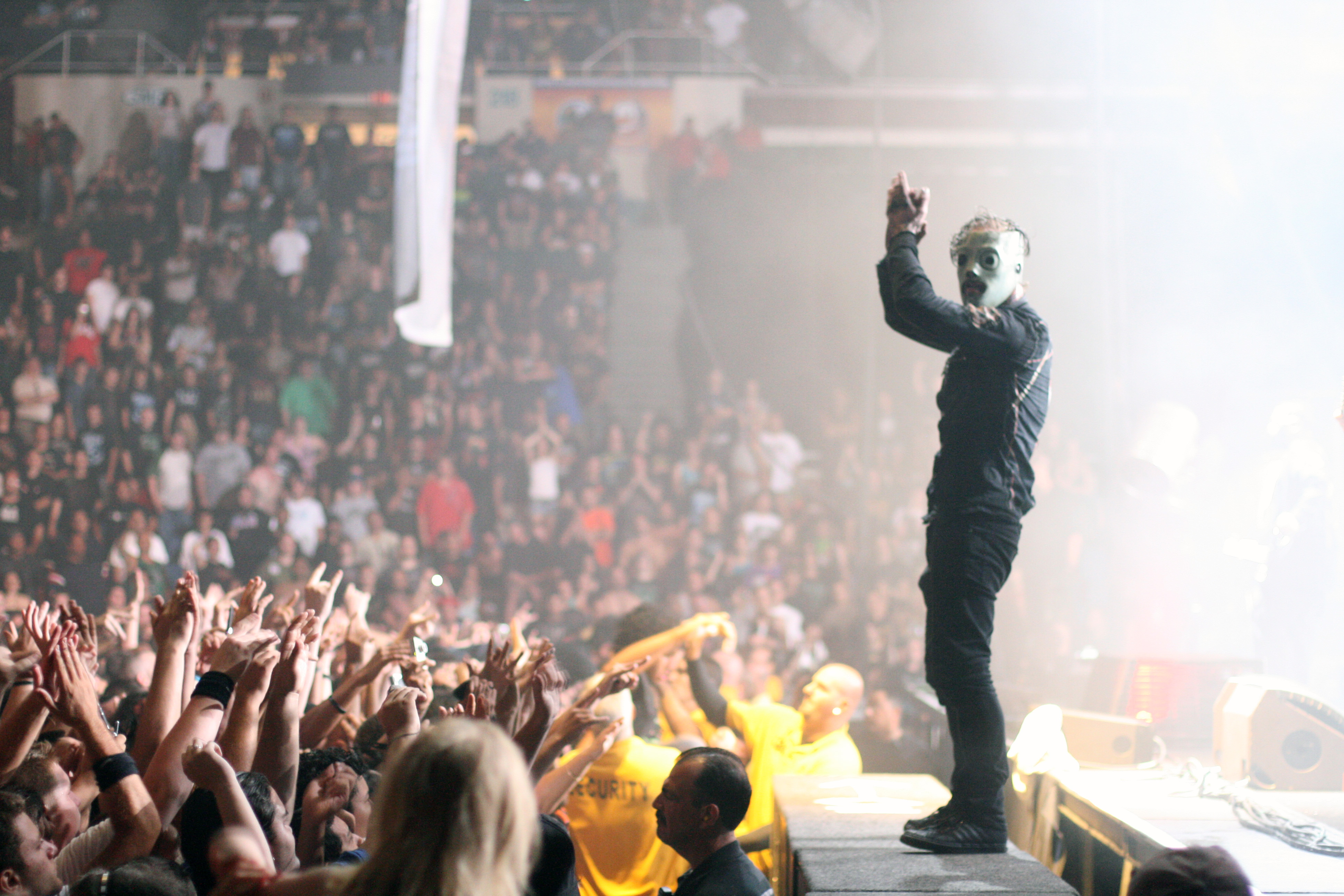
- Corey Taylor performing on the Mayhem Festival 2008
Awards and nominations
Award	Wins	Nominations
Echo	0	1
Grammy	1	11
MTV Europe	0	1
MTV VMA	0	1
NME	3	5
Fuse Awards	1	2
Heavy Music Awards	2	6
Kerrang! Awards	7	28
Metal Edge Readers' Choice Awards	21	11
Metal Hammer Golden God Awards	4	8
Revolver Golden Gods Awards	5	6
Total Guitar Readers Awards	3	0

Totals (Note: Certain award groups do not simply award one winner. They acknowledge several different recipients, have runners-up, and have third place. Since this is a specific recognition and is different from losing an award, runner-up mentions are considered wins in this award tally. For simplification and to avoid errors, each award in this list has been presumed to have had a prior nomination.)
- Wins: 48
- Nominations: 80

Slipknot is an American heavy metal band from Des Moines, Iowa. Originally formed under the name of The Pale Ones in September 1995, Slipknot have gone through multiple line-up changes, their lineup remained unaltered from 1999 until 2010 with the death of bassist Paul Gray and the departure of Joey Jordison in 2013. The line-up consists of vocalist Corey Taylor, guitarists Mick Thomson and Jim Root, percussionists Shawn Crahan and Chris Fehn, sampler Craig Jones and turntablist Sid Wilson, bassist Alessandro Venturella and drummer Jay Weinberg.

On June 29, 1999, they released their debut self-titled album Slipknot. "Wait and Bleed", a single from the album won a Kerrang! Award for Best Single in 2000 and also brought the band its first Grammy Award nomination for Best Metal Performance in 2001. Following the release of their second album Iowa, singles "Left Behind" and "My Plague" were also nominated for the Grammy Award for Best Metal Performance in 2002 and 2003 respectively. "My Plague" was also nominated for the Kerrang! Award for Best Video in 2002. On May 25, 2004, Slipknot released their third album Vol. 3: (The Subliminal Verses), which was nominated for Best Album in the 2004 Kerrang! Awards. In 2006, "Before I Forget" a single from the album brought the band their first Grammy Award for Best Metal Performance after six nominations. In 2008 then band released their fourth album All Hope Is Gone, "Psychosocial" single from the album brought the band their first MTV Video Music Awards nomination for Best Rock Video, as well as their seventh Grammy nomination in 2009. Slipknot received their first MTV Europe Music Awards nomination in the Rock Out category, also Kerrang! awarded the band the Kerrang! Icon award. Also in 2009 they received 6 nominations at the Kerrang! Awards, the most of any band that year and in Slipknot's history. Overall, Slipknot has received 48 awards from 80 nominations.

== Emma-gaala ==
Year	Nominee / work	Award	Result	Ref.
2008	Themselves	Best Foreign Artist	Nominated	

== Fuse Awards ==
The Fuse Awards are arranged by Fuse TV and are decided by public vote. Slipknot has received one award from two nominations.

Year	Nominee / work	Award	Result
2008	"Psychosocial"	Best Video	Nominated
2009	"Dead Memories"	Best Video	Won

== Grammy Awards ==
The Grammy Awards are awarded annually by the National Academy of Recording Arts and Sciences. Slipknot has received 1 award from eleven nominations.

Year	Nominee / work	Award	Result
2001	"Wait and Bleed"	Best Metal Performance	Nominated
2002	"Left Behind"	Best Metal Performance	Nominated
2003	"My Plague"	Best Metal Performance	Nominated
2005	"Duality"	Best Hard Rock Performance	Nominated
2005	"Vermilion"	Best Metal Performance	Nominated
2006	"Before I Forget"	Best Metal Performance	Won
2009	"Psychosocial"	Best Metal Performance	Nominated
2015	"The Negative One"	Best Metal Performance	Nominated
2016	"Custer"	Best Metal Performance	Nominated
2016	.5: The Gray Chapter	Best Rock Album	Nominated
2024	"Hive Mind"	Best Metal Performance	Nominated

== Heavy Music Awards ==
The Heavy Music Awards are awarded annually by The Heavy Group and are decided by a public vote.

Year	Nominee / work	Award	Result
2020	Slipknot	Best Live Band	Nominated
2020	Slipknot	Best International Band	Won
2020	"Unsainted"	Best Video	Nominated
2020	We Are Not Your Kind	Best Album	Won
2023	The End, So Far	Best Album	Nominated
2024	Slipknot	Best International Live Artist	Nominated

== Hungarian Music Awards ==
The Hungarian Music Awards have been given to artists in the field of Hungarian music since 1992.

Year	Nominee / work	Award	Result	Ref.
2009	All Hope Is Gone	Best Foreign Hard Rock or Metal Album	Nominated	
2015	.5: The Gray Chapter	Best Foreign Hard Rock or Metal Album	Nominated	
2020	We Are Not Your Kind	Best Foreign Hard Rock or Metal Album	Won	

== Kerrang! Awards ==
The Kerrang! Awards was an annual awards ceremony held by Kerrang!, a British rock magazine. Slipknot has won seven awards from twenty-four nominations.

Year	Nominee / work	Award	Result
2000	"Wait and Bleed"	Best Single	Won
2000	Slipknot	Best International Live Act	Won
2000	Slipknot	Best Band in the World	Won
2000	Slipknot	Best International Newcomer	Nominated
2000	Slipknot	Best Album	Nominated
2000	"Spit It Out"	Best Video	Nominated
2001	Slipknot	Best Band in the World	Won
2002	"My Plague"	Best Video	Nominated
2002	Slipknot	Best International Live Act	Nominated
2002	Slipknot	Best Band in the World	Nominated
2004	Vol. 3: (The Subliminal Verses)	Best Album	Nominated
2004	"Duality"	Best Video	Nominated
2004	Slipknot	Best Live Band	Nominated
2004	Slipknot	Best Band on the Planet	Nominated
2005	Slipknot	Best Live Band	Nominated
2008	Slipknot	Kerrang! Icon	Won
2009	Slipknot	Best Live Band	Won
2009	Slipknot	Best International Band	Won
2009	"Dead Memories"	Best Single	Nominated
2009	"Psychosocial"	Best Single	Nominated
2009	"Sulfur"	Best Video	Nominated
2009	All Hope Is Gone	Best Album	Nominated
2010	"Snuff"	Best Single	Nominated
2015	Slipknot	Best Event	Nominated
2015	Slipknot	Best Live Band	Nominated
2015	Slipknot	Best International Band	Nominated
2019	"All Out Life"	Best Song	Nominated
2019	"All Out Life"	Best International Act	Nominated

== Metal Edge Readers' Choice Awards ==
The Metal Edge Readers' Choice Awards were awarded annually by the now-defunct Metal Edge magazine and decided by a public vote.

Year	Nominee / work	Award	Result
2002	Corey Taylor	Vocalist of the Year	Won
2002	Craig Jones	Keyboardist of the Year	Won
2002	Iowa	Album of the Year	Nominated
2002	Iowa	Album Cover of the Year	Won
2002	Joey Jordison	Drummer of the Year	Won
2002	"Left Behind"	Music Video of the Year (Note: Tied with "Schism" by Tool)	Nominated
2002	"Left Behind"	Song of the Year (Note: Tied with "Gets Me Through" by Ozzy Osbourne)	Won
2002	Mick Thomson	Guitarist of the Year	Nominated
2002	Sid Wilson	DJ of the Year	Won
2002	Slipknot	Band of the Year	Won
2002	Slipknot	Best Live Performance	Nominated
2002	Slipknot	Favorite Ozzfest Band	Won
2002	Slipknot	Favorite Ozzfest Memory	Won
2002	Slipknot	Most Surprising Band on Ozzfest	Won
2002	Slipknot	Who Are You Looking Forward to Most in 2002?	Nominated
2002	Slipknot	Who's Done the Most to Help Hard Rock and Heavy Metal?	Nominated
2005	Corey Taylor	Male Performer of the Year	Won
2005	Corey Taylor	Vocalist of the Year	Won
2005	Craig Jones	Keyboardist of the Year	Won
2005	"Duality"	Song of the Year	Won
2005	"Duality"	Music Video of the Year	Won
2005	Joey Jordison	Drummer of the Year	Nominated
2005	Sid Wilson	DJ of the Year	Won
2005	Slipknot	Band of the Year	Won
2005	Slipknot	Favorite Band on Ozzfest	Nominated
2005	Slipknot	Live Performer of the Year	Won
2005	Slipknot	Most Overrated Band	Nominated
2005	Slipknot	Stage Show of the Year	Won
2005	Slipknot	Who's Done the Most to Help Hard Rock in 2004?	Nominated
2005	Vol. 3: (The Subliminal Verses)	Album of the Year	Won
2005	Vol. 3: (The Subliminal Verses)	Best Album Cover	Won
2005	Vol. 3: (The Subliminal Verses)	Worst Album Cover	Nominated

== Metal Hammer Golden God Awards ==
The Metal Hammer Golden Gods Awards is an annual awards ceremony held by Metal Hammer, a British heavy metal magazine. Slipknot has won three awards from nine nominations.

Year	Nominee / work	Award	Result
2005	Slipknot	Best Live Band	Won
2008	Slipknot	Inspiration Award	Nominated
2009	Slipknot	Best Live Band	Won
2009	Slipknot	Best International Band	Won
2009	Mick Thomson & Jim Root	Shredder(s)	Nominated
2010	Corey Taylor	Best Vocalist	Nominated
2011	Joey Jordison	Best Drummer	Nominated
2012	Slipknot	Best Comeback of the Year	Won

== MTV Europe Music Awards ==
The MTV Europe Music Awards is an annual awards ceremony established in 1994 by MTV Europe. Slipknot has received one nomination.

Year	Nominee / work	Award	Result
2008	Slipknot	Rock Out	Nominated

== MTV Video Music Awards ==
The MTV Video Music Awards were established in 1984 by MTV to celebrate the top music videos of the year. Slipknot has received one nomination.

Year	Nominee / work	Award	Result
2008	"Psychosocial"	Best Rock Video	Nominated

== NME ==
Founded by the music magazine NME, the NME Awards are awarded annually. Slipknot has received three awards.

=== NME Premier Awards ===
Year	Nominee / work	Award	Result
2000	Slipknot	Brightest Hope	Won

=== NME Carling Awards ===
Year	Nominee / work	Award	Result
2002	Iowa	Best Album	Nominated
2002	Slipknot	Best Metal Band	Won

=== NME Awards 2020 ===
Year	Nominee / work	Award	Result
2020	We Are Not Your Kind	Best Album In The World	Nominated
2020	Slipknot	Best Band In The World	Won

== Pollstar Concert Industry Awards ==
The Pollstar Concert Industry Awards is an annual award ceremony to honor artists and professionals in the concert industry.

Year	Nominee / work	Award	Result	Ref.
2009	All Hope Is Gone World Tour	Most Creative Tour Package	Nominated	

== Revolver Golden Gods Awards ==
The Revolver Golden Gods Awards is an annual awards ceremony held by Revolver, an American hard rock and heavy metal magazine. Slipknot has won Five awards. Lead Singer/Frontman Corey Taylor has won one.

Year	Nominee / work	Award	Result
2009	Slipknot	Best Live Band	Won
2009	"Psychosocial"	Best Riff	Won
2012	Slipknot	Comeback of the Year	Won
2013	Slipknot	Most Dedicated Fans	Nominated
2013	Slipknot	Best Live Band	Won
2013	Corey Taylor	Best Vocalist	Won

== Total Guitar Readers Awards ==
The Total Guitar Readers Awards is an annual awards ceremony held by Total Guitar, a British guitar magazine. Slipknot has won three awards from three nominations.

Year	Nominee / work	Award	Result
2008	"Psychosocial"	Best Video	Won
2008	"Psychosocial"	Solo of the Year	Won
2008	Fender Jim Root Telecaster	Hottest Guitar	Won

== Žebřík Music Awards ==
Year	Nominee / work	Award	Result	Ref.
2001	Slipknot	Best International Surprise	Nominated	
2015	Slipknot	Best International Group	Nominated	
