= Sulfur (song) =

Single by Slipknot

from the album All Hope Is Gone
- Released: June 15, 2009
- Studio: Sound Farm (Jamaica, Iowa)
- Genre: Nu metal; thrash metal; hard rock; melodic metalcore
- Length: 4:38
- Label: Roadrunner
- Songwriters: Jim Root; Joey Jordison
- Producer: Dave Fortman

Slipknot singles chronology
"Dead Memories" (2008)	"Sulfur" (2009)	"Snuff" (2009)

Alternative cover
- Cover for "Sulfur" (Chris Lord-Alge mix)

Music video
- "Sulfur" on YouTube

"Sulfur" is the fourth single from American heavy metal band Slipknot's fourth album, All Hope Is Gone. The single was released on June 15, 2009, after a video was released on April 18, 2009. This was the last Slipknot video to feature their full original lineup with both bassist Paul Gray, who died the next year, and also the final appearance from Joey Jordison who was fired from the band four years later, before his death in July 2021.

== Background ==
"This is the first song Jim [Root, guitarist] and I ever wrote together. I took my electronic drums to his house and set them up in the kitchen. He wrote all the riffs, then we put them together. It was really special to write a song with him at last." – Joey Jordison

"It makes me feel like I've got the pedal down in my '72 Charger and I don't give a fuck if I hit a brick wall. Corey [Taylor, singer]'s lyrics about breathing in sulfur are so good. That's one of those smells that's nasty, but you like it anyway. That's a lot like Slipknot." – Shawn Crahan

== Music video ==
The video was filmed on March 9, 2009 (just two days before the end of the All Hope Is Gone World Tour) in the Los Angeles area. It was codirected by percussionist Shawn Crahan and P. R. Brown; the latter's third Slipknot video. On April 14, 2009, Slipknot released a thirty-second preview of the video through MTV and announced it would be premiered on Headbangers Ball on April 18, 2009.

The video depicts the nine members playing in groups of three as well as footage of each member submerged underwater. Crahan explained that when he writes treatments for their videos he thinks, "What has Slipknot not done? What can we embark upon that will be fun and knowledge-enhancing instead of the same old song and dance?", saying that the members themselves are the treatment for this video. This further shows that they always try to give their fans as much of themselves as they can even though they are tired of live performances; revealing that, to change things up, they shot the members performing in groups of three. The concept of the members appearing individually underwater was modeled after a video installation entitled "Ascension" by video artist Bill Viola.

Crahan explained that the smell of sulfur is "something people either love or hate, and if you hate it, then it can be suffocating", so they incorporated water as a visual representation of that. He revealed that the members felt uncomfortable when shooting in an eleven-foot glass tank; he further explained, "You had to go up this really weird ladder and the water was dirty and it was a five-foot by five-foot tank and it looked like when you stepped into it you were gonna hit your head on the frame that holds the glass and it would just rip your nose off," but added that it was his favorite video so far "because it involved that fear". Chris Fehn expressed anxiety about the jump and Taylor was at one point "impaled" by one of Craig Jones' spikes. When Shawn comes up, he does it with his baseball bat.

== Track listing ==
Radio Mix Digital Download

1. "Sulfur" (radio mix) – 4:03

Digital Download

1. "Sulfur" (Chris Lord-Alge mix) – 4:37
2. "Sulfur" (music video) – 5:03

US Promo CD

1. "Sulfur" (edit) – 3:59
2. "Sulfur" – 4:37

EU Promo CD

1. "Sulfur" (radio mix - edit) – 4:01
2. "Sulfur" (radio mix) – 4:37

== Personnel ==
Slipknot
- (#8) Corey Taylor – vocals
- (#7) Mick Thomson – guitar
- (#6) Shawn Crahan – percussion, vocals, music video director
- (#5) Craig Jones – samples
- (#4) Jim Root – guitar
- (#3) Chris Fehn – percussion, vocals
- (#2) Paul Gray – bass
- (#1) Joey Jordison – drums
- (#0) Sid Wilson – turntables, keyboards

Additional Personnel

- Dave Fortman – producer
- Jeremy Parker – engineer
- Colin Richardson – mixing
- Matt Hyde – mix engineer
- Oli Wright – assistant engineer
- Ted Jensen – mastering
- P. R. Brown – director

== Charts ==
Chart performance for "Sulfur"
Chart (2009)	Peak position
US Mainstream Rock (Billboard)	18
