= All Hope Is Gone (song) =

Single by Slipknot

from the album All Hope Is Gone
- Released: June 23, 2008
- Recorded: 2008
- Studio: Sound Farm (Jamaica, Iowa)
- Genre: Thrash metal; metalcore
- Length: 4:47
- Label: Roadrunner
- Songwriters: Paul Gray; Joey Jordison; Jim Root; Corey Taylor; Mick Thomson
- Producer: Dave Fortman

Slipknot singles chronology
"The Blister Exists" (2006)	"All Hope Is Gone" (2008)	"Psychosocial" (2008)

"All Hope Is Gone" is a song by American heavy metal band Slipknot, released as the first single and title track from the album All Hope Is Gone. It was released on June 20, 2008, as a free MP3 on the band's website, after which it was released as a paid download on June 23, 2008.

The song was originally announced by blabbermouth.net to be "a heavier track" from All Hope Is Gone, scheduled to begin airplay on June 15. "All Hope Is Gone" is also the first title track from a Slipknot album to be released as a single.

== Themes and production ==
In an interview with Kerrang! drummer Joey Jordison revealed that "All Hope Is Gone" is a true collaborative effort between the band and was one of the final songs recorded for the band's fourth studio album of the same name. "The song, music and theme speak for itself. It's a song about the world at stake: all the situations at hand, be it personal or worldly, and trying to turn things into a positive. Sometimes you have to face the grotesque to bring about something amazing". Jordison went on to say, "I actually demoed this song alone and didn't know what would come of it as we were nearing the end of the album. I was hoping it would make it. I knew it would, once everyone spewed their venom upon it".

Of the song's conception, Jordison said, "A lot of the grind riffs for the verses were made of riffs Paul had years ago, way before Slipknot. Funny how things won't die. Mick came in and fucking set fire to the track and Jim Root followed as well. Once Corey put his fucking vocals on it, that was it, man. That guy's voice and conviction could sell narcotics to a nun".

== Track listing ==
1. "All Hope Is Gone" – 4:47

== Charts ==
Chart performance for "All Hope Is Gone"
Chart (2008)	Peak position
Sweden (Sverigetopplistan)	42
UK Singles (Official Charts)	98
