= Frank Watkinson =

English singer-songwriter (born 1953)

- Born: Frank Thomas Watkinson; 26 June 1953 (age 73); Huntingdon, England
- Genres: Folk, Acoustic
- Occupations: Singer-songwriter, YouTuber
- Instruments: Guitar, vocals
- Years active: 2011–present
- Website: www.youtube.com/c/FrankWatkinson

Frank Thomas Watkinson (born 26 June 1953) is a British singer-songwriter and YouTube musician known for acoustic covers and original songs.

== YouTube music ==
Watkinson, who is retired, started his YouTube channel in 2011. His channel has a mix of acoustic covers and original songs. His acoustic rendition of Slipknot's "Snuff" received media attention. As of June 2026, his channel has over 1.2 million subscribers and more than 54 million total views.

Watkinson draws inspiration from folk and acoustic artists such as Paul Simon, Ralph McTell, Cat Stevens, Passenger, and Ed Sheeran. His original compositions have themes of aging, loss, and introspection, reflecting his personal experiences and observations.

Watkinson has been interviewed and written about by InsideHook, Flood Magazine, Fevers of the Mind, MuzicNotez, and Honi Soit, among others. In July 2026, he was in an advertising campaign for KFC.
