= Outside the Nine =

Outside The Nine
- Abbreviation: OT9
- Formation: 2005
- Type: Fan club
- Purpose: Fans' advocacy
- Members: private persons
- Club focus: Slipknot
- Affiliations: Sparkart
- Website: (External links)

Outside The Nine is the official fan club of American heavy metal band Slipknot, and was launched in 2005. The fan club is an online community which offers members an array of privileges at an annual subscription fee.

== Overview ==
The Outside The Nine community was launched in 2005 and offers members exclusive privileges and an online area in which to commute. Exclusive privileges offered to members include; exclusive music, videos and photos, listening parties, sneak previews, contests, give-aways, personalised email address, private message board, blogs and pre-sale opportunities among others. Membership is charged at an annual fee of US$19.99 and with each additional year subscribers are rewarded with added bonuses including DVDs and exclusive letters.

== Best Buy offers ==
Membership for Outside The Nine has also been sold at Best Buy stores across the United States. At a reduced price of US$9.99 members can purchase a redeem code which is then used to activate their account online. Also, prior to the release of All Hope Is Gone Best Buy offered an online pre-order only trial membership to the fan club, which was also redeemed with a code when purchased. The item is packaged in a CD case, and includes a one-year membership to the club (which is included on a card), an official "Outside the Nine patch" with an individual bar code number, each beginning with "515," and a letter from the band.
