= Dead Memories =

2008 single by Slipknot

Single by Slipknot

from the album All Hope Is Gone
- Released: December 1, 2008
- Recorded: February 2008 – June 2008
- Studio: Sound Farm (Jamaica, Iowa)
- Length: 4:29 (album version); 4:22 (radio edit)
- Label: Roadrunner
- Songwriters: Corey Taylor, Mick Thomson, Jim Root, Paul Gray, Joey Jordison, Shawn Crahan, Chris Fehn, Sid Wilson, and Craig Jones
- Producer: Dave Fortman

Slipknot singles chronology
"Psychosocial" (2008)	"Dead Memories" (2008)	"Sulfur" (2009)

Music video
- "Dead Memories" on YouTube

"Dead Memories" is a song from American heavy metal band Slipknot's fourth album, All Hope Is Gone. It was released on December 1, 2008.

"I had gone through a pretty brutal divorce at that point," explained Corey Taylor. "This [song] was me letting go of a lot of regret and cynical feelings. It was very cathartic… I got a lot out on that album.

Released as the third single from All Hope Is Gone, its video was directed by P. R. Brown and Shawn Crahan. The video premiered on MTV2 on October 25, 2008.

== Music video ==
The music video for "Dead Memories" was directed by P. R. Brown. On September 30, 2008, the band's record label Roadrunner Records released a 15-second teaser video on YouTube which featured vocalist Corey Taylor in what appears to be a grave in torrential rain. The video premiered on MTV's Headbangers Ball on October 25, 2008, as part of the Headbangers Ball 20th anniversary special programming. The treatment for the music video was percussionist Shawn Crahan's idea, Crahan calls the video a "short film" and admits it was "very" expensive. Crahan's initial idea was to have several rooms; he introduced the idea to vocalist Corey Taylor who decided what each room would be.

The video starts with Taylor walking from the Iowa State Capitol in downtown Des Moines to a rural area. Taylor walks through empty fields and begins to dig. He seemingly falls through the ground into a room below, now wearing a mask. The room is occupied by turntablist Sid Wilson, crawling on the walls and ceiling. Taylor opens the curtains, only to find the view obscured by earth, suggesting the room is underground. Wilson tries to stop Taylor from leaving the room by grabbing his leg but Taylor manages to escape and enter a second room, occupied by drummer Joey Jordison, who is being assisted and nursed by four women. Taylor spectates the scene, but does not interact with anybody. As Jordison spots Taylor's reflection in a mirror and turns to look at him, the latter enters a third room, occupied by sampler and keyboardist Craig Jones. In this segment, the video's colours are reversed and remain so throughout the scene but Taylor's actions imply that the room itself is either very dark or dimly lit. Taylor walks around Jones, who remains immobile, and inspects his mask, touching one of the nails in it to get any response but to no avail. Jones lights a flare, which temporarily blinds Taylor, who leaves.

Taylor enters the fourth room, occupied by bassist Paul Gray. The room is filled with mirrors and when Taylor passes, he is reflected along with Gray. Taylor becomes unnerved and attempts to ascertain whether it is Gray or not by turning from the mirror and back to it. He then waves and Gray uses the wrong hand, revealing that he is not a reflection. Gray advances, smashing the mirror, and his image appears in all the mirrors, visibly frightening Taylor. Backing away, Taylor falls backwards, and into another room, occupied by percussionist Shawn Crahan, who is dancing with several women. Again, just like in the second room with Jordison, he does not interact with anybody, although two women persuade him to stay.

When Taylor pushes his way into another room, he is met by guitarist Mick Thomson. The two standoff, only for Taylor to fail to push past Thomson several times. Thomson advances towards Taylor, who bolts through the door he came through. He enters a seventh room, occupied by guitarist Jim Root and several women, this time engaged in a pillow fight. Root spots Taylor but seems too caught up in the moment to interact with him. Taylor walks through the crowd into an eighth room, occupied by percussionist Chris Fehn, who is lighting candles. Taylor spectates and eventually blows a candle out while Fehn looks on. In the end, a masked Taylor emerges from the pit, where his unmasked counterpart is also seen digging as shown at the beginning. On November 5, 2009, a 10-minute "short film" version of the video, featuring narration by Corey Taylor was released.

== Reception ==
Reviews of All Hope Is Gone remarked on the song's melody and accessibility. Blabbermouth.net's Ryan Ogle says that the track shows Slipknot's diversity. He went on to state it is "well-written and melodious". Total Guitar's writer Nick Cracknell compared "Dead Memories" to the works of Alice in Chains. Dan Martin of The Guardian compared it to "Enter Sandman" by Metallica: "[It] is so listenable it's almost conventional". However, Jim Kaz of IGN said that the track almost detracts from the intensity of the album, stating, "it's at this point the band loses a little momentum". In the same vein Ogle of Blabbermouth.net says that it's a track that "lack[s] the white hot fire that allows the rest of the disc to burn our asses". It was nominated for the Kerrang! Award for Best Single. It is the band's third-highest single – behind "Snuff" and "The Devil in I", which both peaked at number 2 on the Mainstream Rock tracks chart – peaking at number 3. On the Active Rock chart, it peaked at number one.

== Track listing ==
"2008 Digital Download

1. "Dead Memories" (Radio mix; U.S. Edit) – 3:58

"2009 Digital Download

1. "Dead Memories" (Chris Lord-Alge mix) – 3:58
2. "Dead Memories" (music video) – 4:54

US one-track Promo CD

1. "Dead Memories"

US two-track Promo CD

1. "Dead Memories" (edit) – 3:57
2. "Dead Memories" – 4:26

UK Promo CD

1. "Dead Memories" (edit) – 3:38
2. "Dead Memories" (alternate edit) – 3:57
3. "Dead Memories" – 4:28

== Personnel ==
- (#0) Sid Wilson – turntables
- (#1) Joey Jordison – drums
- (#2) Paul Gray – bass
- (#3) Chris Fehn – percussion
- (#4) Jim Root – lead guitar
- (#5) Craig Jones – sampler, keyboards
- (#6) Shawn Crahan – percussion
- (#7) Mick Thomson – rhythm guitar
- (#8) Corey Taylor – vocals

Production

- Dave Fortman – producer
- Colin Richardson – mixing

== Charts ==
=== Weekly charts ===
Weekly chart performance for "Dead Memories"
Chart (2009)	Peak position
Canada Rock (Billboard)	50
UK Rock & Metal (Official Charts)	37
US Hot Rock & Alternative Songs (Billboard)	25

=== Year-end charts ===
Year-end chart performance for "Dead Memories"
Chart (2009)	Position
US Hot Rock Songs (Billboard)	35
