= Psychosocial (song) =

Single by Slipknot

from the album All Hope Is Gone
- B-side: "All Hope Is Gone"
- Released: July 7, 2008
- Studio: Sound Farm (Jamaica, Iowa)
- Genre: Nu metal; alternative metal
- Length: 4:44 (album version); 3:57 (radio edit)
- Label: Roadrunner
- Songwriters: Corey Taylor; Joey Jordison; Paul Gray
- Producer: Dave Fortman

Slipknot singles chronology
"All Hope Is Gone" (2008)	"Psychosocial" (2008)	"Dead Memories" (2008)

Alternative cover
- 7" vinyl cover

Music video
- "Psychosocial" on YouTube

"Psychosocial" is a song by American heavy metal band Slipknot. Released as the second single from the band's fourth studio album, All Hope Is Gone (2008). The song entered airplay on June 26, 2008. It was originally planned for release as a digital single on July 1 but was delayed and released on July 7. Slipknot performed "Psychosocial" live for the first time on July 9, 2008, at the White River Amphitheatre in Auburn, Washington.

== Background ==
"That song has got a lot of, I would say, social anxiety. It's got a real good tempo. It's really fun and it's different… Most of the stuff that we have is different." – Shawn Crahan, The Pulse of Radio

"This is another me-and-Paul [Gray, bassist] creation. It was similar to 'Duality', in that I had mixed feelings about whether it was a good song… Then we got together and started working on it as a team and it just came together. A lot of bands, who I won't name, have ripped this song off. I guess you know you've done something good if everyone rips you off." – Joey Jordison

"I was writing lyrics when Paul and Joey played this to me. I looked at the sheet I'd been working on and at the bottom was the chorus for 'Psychosocial' already… This song was meant to be." – Corey Taylor

"I had to ask Corey what 'Psychosocial' meant. He wouldn't tell me." – Shawn Crahan

Rolling Stone praised the song, saying it "slows down the tempo to bludgeon with a steady, pounding groove instead of all-out thrash in a manner reminiscent of the band's more slow-burning but still malicious second album, Iowa." They explained, "That track is capped off with a time-signature shattering guitar/drum breakdown that will leave the best air-instrumentalists stumped".

== Reception and awards ==
In 2020, Kerrang and Louder Sound ranked the song number nine and number four, respectively, on their lists of the greatest Slipknot songs. The song was also nominated for 'Best Metal Performance' for the 51st Grammy Awards, but lost to Metallica's "My Apocalypse", and was nominated for the Kerrang! Award for Best Single.

== Music video ==
The music video for "Psychosocial" was shot at Sound Farm studios in Jamaica, Iowa on June 30, 2008. The shoot was delayed due to an unrelated head injury sustained by turntablist Sid Wilson before the shoot, who was subsequently hospitalized. On July 18, 2008, the video premiered on MTV's FNMTV show, hosted by Pete Wentz. The video, which was directed by Paul Brown, was shot using high-end cameras which shoot 1,000 frames per second and are contrasted with traditional 35 mm hand crank camera equipment. Percussionist Shawn Crahan explained; "we have the most extreme on both ends, with nothing in the middle. That's what the video is, and nobody does that. There's an art form behind it."

During an interview with Kerrang!, guitarist Jim Root revealed that the video features the burning of the purgatory masks adorned by the band members in the splash teaser photos shown on Slipknot's website, reportedly because the masks represent the band's ego.

There are two versions of the video. One uses the album version of the song, whilst the other uses a much shorter version of the song; excluding the "Limits of the Dead!" lines. The video was nominated to Best Rock Video at the VMA's 2008. On YouTube the video of the song had gained over 22 million views, before it was removed in December due to a dispute between Roadrunner Records' distributor, Warner Music Group, and YouTube.

== Track listing ==
All lyrics and music composed by Slipknot.

US Promo CD

1. "Psychosocial" (edit) – 3:57
2. "Psychosocial" (album version) – 4:42

7" vinyl / Limited edition CD

1. "Psychosocial" – 4:43
2. "All Hope Is Gone" – 4:44

Digital download

1. "Psychosocial" – 4:44

Germany and Japan Promo CD

1. "Psychosocial" (edit) – 3:57
2. "All Hope Is Gone" – 4:44
3. "Psychosocial" (album version) – 4:43

Digital download (Live)

1. "Psychosocial" (live) – 4:36

== Personnel ==
Slipknot

- (#0) Sid Wilson – turntables
- (#1) Joey Jordison – drums
- (#2) Paul Gray – bass, backing vocals
- (#3) Chris Fehn – toms, timpani, snare drum, backing vocals
- (#4) Jim Root – guitar (second solo)
- (#5) Craig Jones – sampler, MIDI
- (#6) Shawn Crahan – gong, beer keg, snare drum, backing vocals
- (#7) Mick Thomson – guitar (first solo)
- (#8) Corey Taylor – lead vocals

Production

- Dave Fortman – producer
- Colin Richardson – mixing

== Charts ==
=== Weekly charts ===
Weekly chart performance for "Psychosocial"
Chart (2008–2009)	Peak position
Australia (ARIA)	84
Austria (Ö3 Austria Top 40)	65
Canada Hot 100 (Billboard)	75
Finland (Suomen virallinen lista)	23
France (SNEP)	100
Germany (GfK)	31
New Zealand (Recorded Music NZ)	35
Sweden (Sverigetopplistan)	28
UK Singles (OCC)	67
UK Rock & Metal (OCC)	17
US Bubbling Under Hot 100 (Billboard)	2
US Digital Song Sales (Billboard)	66
US Mainstream Rock (Billboard)	7
US Alternative Airplay (Billboard)	20

=== Year-end charts ===
Year-end chart performance for "Psychosocial"
Chart (2008)	Position
US Mainstream Rock (Billboard)	25

== Certifications ==
Certifications for "Psychosocial"
Region	Certification	Certified units/sales
Canada (Music Canada)	3× Platinum	240,000^{‡}
Denmark (IFPI Danmark)	Gold	45,000^{‡}
New Zealand (RMNZ)	Platinum	30,000^{‡}
Portugal (AFP)	Gold	10,000^{‡}
United Kingdom (BPI)	Platinum	600,000^{‡}
^{‡} Sales+streaming figures based on certification alone.
