= All Hope Is Gone World Tour =

2008–2009 concert tour by Slipknot

- World tour by Slipknot
- Promotional poster for Slipknot's first ever appearance in Israel
- Location: Europe; Japan; North America; Oceania
- Associated album: All Hope Is Gone
- Start date: July 9, 2008
- End date: October 31, 2009
- Legs: 9
- No. of shows: 153

Slipknot concert chronology
- The Subliminal Verses World Tour (2004–2005); All Hope Is Gone World Tour (2008–2009); Memorial World Tour (2011–2012)

The All Hope Is Gone World Tour was a concert tour by Slipknot that took place in 2008 and 2009 in support of the group's fourth studio album All Hope Is Gone. The tour consisted of nine legs and took place in the United States, Canada, Japan, Australia, New Zealand, and Europe. The tour started with the Mayhem Festival 2008.

Lawrence Upton acted as the tour's director, Philippe Vachon acted as the tour's programmer and lighting co-director, and Dave Watson as lighting designer. Equipment such as LED units and Martin Atomic 3000 Strobes were used on the rig, and instead of a media server, the GrandMA mixing console was used for MA Lighting. David "Shirt" Nicholls was positioned as audio mixer, working with the digital mixing console.

Slipknot headlined every performance throughout the tour, sometimes sharing headlining status at festival appearances. Supporting acts throughout the tour included Disturbed, DragonForce, Mastodon, Machine Head, Children of Bodom, Coheed and Cambria, Trivium, 3 Inches of Blood, DevilDriver, The Black Dahlia Murder, and Sydonia. The tour consisted of nine legs and 153 shows, beginning on July 9, 2008, and finishing on October 31, 2009. This was also Slipknot's last tour to feature their full original lineup with bassist Paul Gray before his death on May 24, 2010.

Turntablist Sid Wilson broke both of his heels after jumping from an elevated area of a stage and landing incorrectly. He performed all dates of the tour, in a wheelchair. Drummer Joey Jordison sustained a broken ankle, causing four concerts to be cancelled. Towards the end of the leg Fehn left the tour due to a death in his family, forcing him to miss the final two dates of the leg in Spain. Shawn Crahan left the Canadian part of the tour to return home to his family.

== Background ==
In early February 2008, Mick Thomson confirmed that Slipknot would be performing at the 2008 Mayhem Festival. Corey Taylor said: "This summer we are truly bringing Mayhem. Slipknot is excited to be a part of it, and to be able to bring the new chapter of our history to the masses. We are already working, building and designing a new show." The tour acted as a follow-up to The Subliminal Verses World Tour, which took place in 2004 to promote their third studio album Vol. 3: (The Subliminal Verses). The band began recording their fourth studio album All Hope Is Gone in late February 2008.

== Lighting ==
Lawrence Upton acted as the tour's director, and Philippe Vachon acted as the tour's programmer and lighting co-director. Vachon said Upton wanted "very aggressive lighting that would attack and have punch", because Slipknot's music was very aggressive. Up-stage provided the gear package, which included 10 Martin Professional MAC Profiles and 54 Martin Mac 2000 Wash units. Assistant lighting designer Dave Watson explained that the Martin Professional MAC Profiles were used as "key lights", while Martin Mac 2000 Wash units generated higher light output. Issues arose during the tour, specifically times when members were barely visible due to the lighting. Vachon said, "There is so much show in your face that we would lose the guys on stage; we had to beef up the front-of-house [with] white."

The rig consisted of a Front of House truss, two three-quarter angled trusses, and two straight mid-stage trusses. These were all located up-stage, and had two sub-hung trusses directly below them. There were two Lycian Starklite medium-throw truss spots, and an accumulation of specialty lights. The specialty lights included 54 two-light Molefays, six PAR 36 rotating beacons, 24 Martin Atomic 300 Strobes, 2 six-light Molefays, and 10 four-light Molefays. The rig also had LED units, which can be very bright, and which shone into the audience. Throughout the tour, 65 Philips Color Kinetics ColorBlast 12s, seven Color Blaze 48s, and twelve CK ColorBlaze 72s were used to light up the wall behind the band.

Instead of a media server, the GrandMA console was used for MA Lighting. Vachon explained that the GrandMA console was "the desk you can do the most with LEDs; if you want to go further, you need a media serverCTB." The assistant lighting designer used a full-sized GrandMA console. Two NSPs provided the necessary extra channels. The show's color palette was somewhat restricted. There was mostly white lights, but Upton used lighter colors to get the most light output. The original palette was also based on colors like amber, steel blue, sea green, and orange. Late in the tour Vachon would add additional bursts of color, which included intense oranges, reds, and violets.

== Sound production ==
David "Shirt" Nicholls was the audio mixer, using a Digidesign Venue with both the Eventide Anthology Pack, which provided sound effects, and Venue Pro Pack, which was a complete digital mixing console. Nicholls has expressed his admiration for the Venue Pro Pack and also explained that the A-T 4050 microphones which he used on the tour took a battering during shows. Nicholls has called the T6100 vocal microphones he used "bulletproof" as they would occasionally "go flying up into the seats" during shows but would still work the next show. The Meyer P.A., which accumulates 16 MILO seat boxes, nine Nexo CD-18 subwoofers, and six flown HP700s on the ground per side, was provided by Thunder Audio.

The system was controlled by Meyer Sound Galileo. The side-hang featured 10 MICA boxes per side, with four UPJs for front-fills. Ron Hurd, the tour's monitor engineer, mixed the show using a Yamaha PM5D console. Hurd said, "I'm not using any plug-ins or rack gear except for an [Apogee] Big Ben word clock. Six of the nine guys are on ears: Ultimate Ears with Sennheiser G2s."

== Mayhem Festival ==
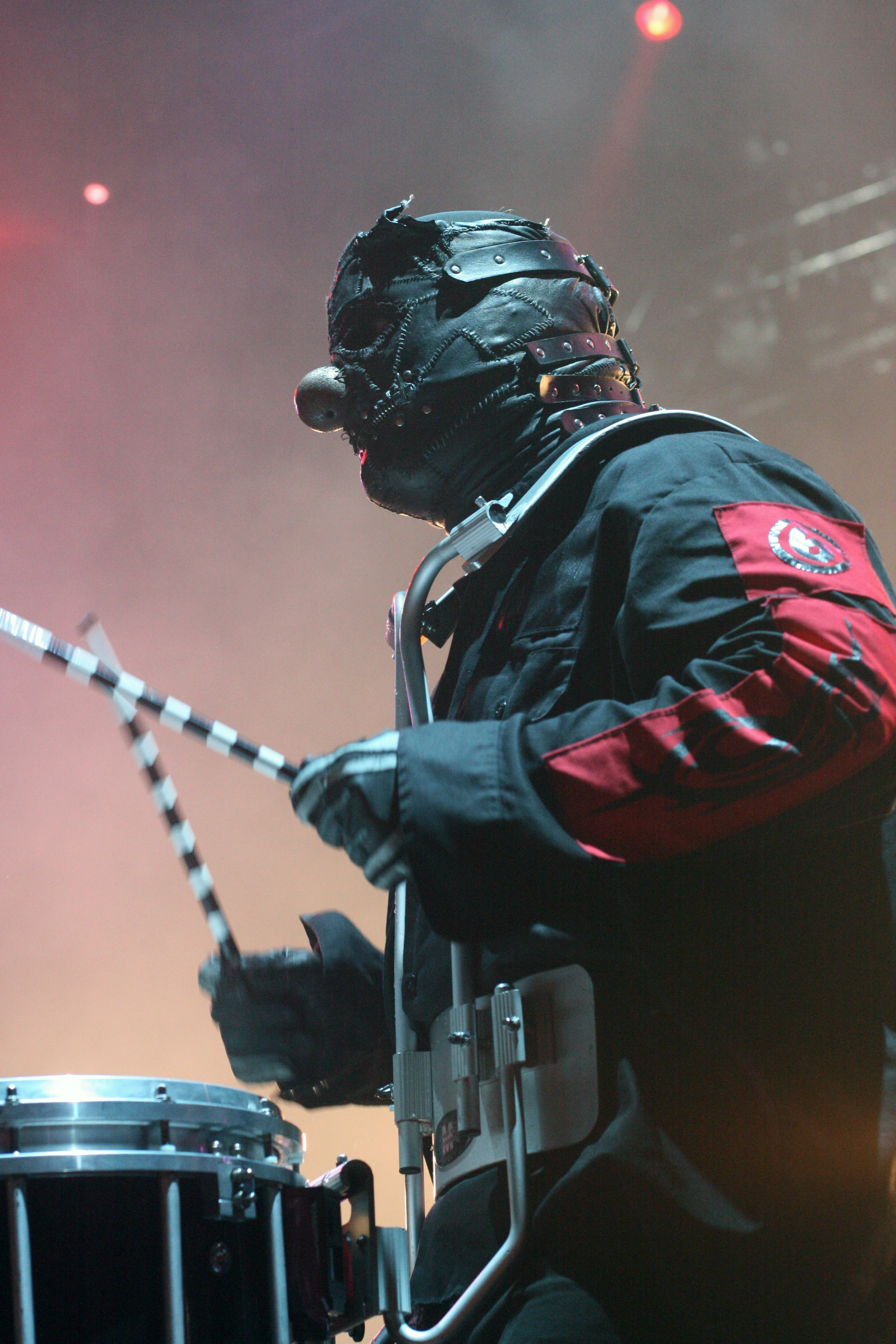
Shawn Crahan performing in Uniondale, New York, as part of the Mayhem Festival

Slipknot began touring at the first ever Mayhem Festival, a music festival founded by Kevin Lyman and John Reese. During the opening date of the Mayhem Festival 2008 on July 9 at Auburn, Washington, turntablist Sid Wilson broke both of his heels after jumping from an elevated area of the stage and landing incorrectly. Despite the injury, he promised to perform on all dates of the tour in a wheelchair. Wilson returned to the band, in a wheelchair and with both his legs in casts, on the second date of the festival at Mountain View, California; he did, however, perform without the wheelchair at times.

The second date of the Mayhem Festival in Marysville, California, on July 11 was rescheduled to July 14 due to wildfires in the area.

=== Tour dates ===
Date	City	Country	Venue
With: Disturbed, DragonForce, Mastodon and others
July 9, 2008	Auburn	United States	White River Amphitheatre
July 11, 2008	Wheatland	United States	~~Sleep Train Amphitheatre~~
July 12, 2008	Mountain View	United States	Shoreline Amphitheatre
July 13, 2008	San Bernardino	United States	San Manuel Amphitheater
July 14, 2008	Wheatland	United States	Sleep Train Amphitheatre
July 15, 2008	Fresno	United States	Save Mart Center
July 16, 2008	Chula Vista	United States	Cricket Wireless Amphitheatre
July 18, 2008	Phoenix	United States	Cricket Wireless Pavilion
July 19, 2008	Albuquerque	United States	Journal Pavilion
July 20, 2008	Greenwood Village	United States	Fiddler's Green Amphitheatre
July 22, 2008	Bonner Springs	United States	Verizon Wireless Amphitheatre
July 23, 2008	Maryland Heights	United States	Verizon Wireless Amphitheater
July 25, 2008	Dallas	United States	SuperPages.com Center
July 26, 2008	Selma	United States	Verizon Wireless Amphitheater
July 27, 2008	Houston	United States	Sam Houston Race Park
July 29, 2008	Tampa	United States	Ford Amphitheatre
July 30, 2008	West Palm Beach	United States	Cruzan Amphitheatre
August 1, 2008	Virginia Beach	United States	Verizon Wireless Amphitheater
August 2, 2008	Burgettstown	United States	Post-Gazette Pavilion
August 3, 2008	Scranton	United States	Toyota Pavilion
August 5, 2008	Mansfield	United States	Comcast Center
August 6, 2008	Uniondale	United States	Nassau Coliseum
August 8, 2008	Toronto	Canada	Downsview Park
August 9, 2008	Clarkston	United States	DTE Energy Music Theatre
August 10, 2008	Tinley Park	United States	First Midwest Bank Amphitheatre
August 12, 2008	Atlanta	United States	Lakewood Amphitheatre
August 13, 2008	Noblesville	United States	Verizon Wireless Music Center
August 15, 2008	Camden	United States	Susquehanna Bank Center
August 16, 2008	Hartford	United States	New England Dodge Music Center
August 17, 2008	Bristow	United States	Nissan Pavilion
August 18, 2008	Corfu	United States	Darien Lake Performing Arts Center

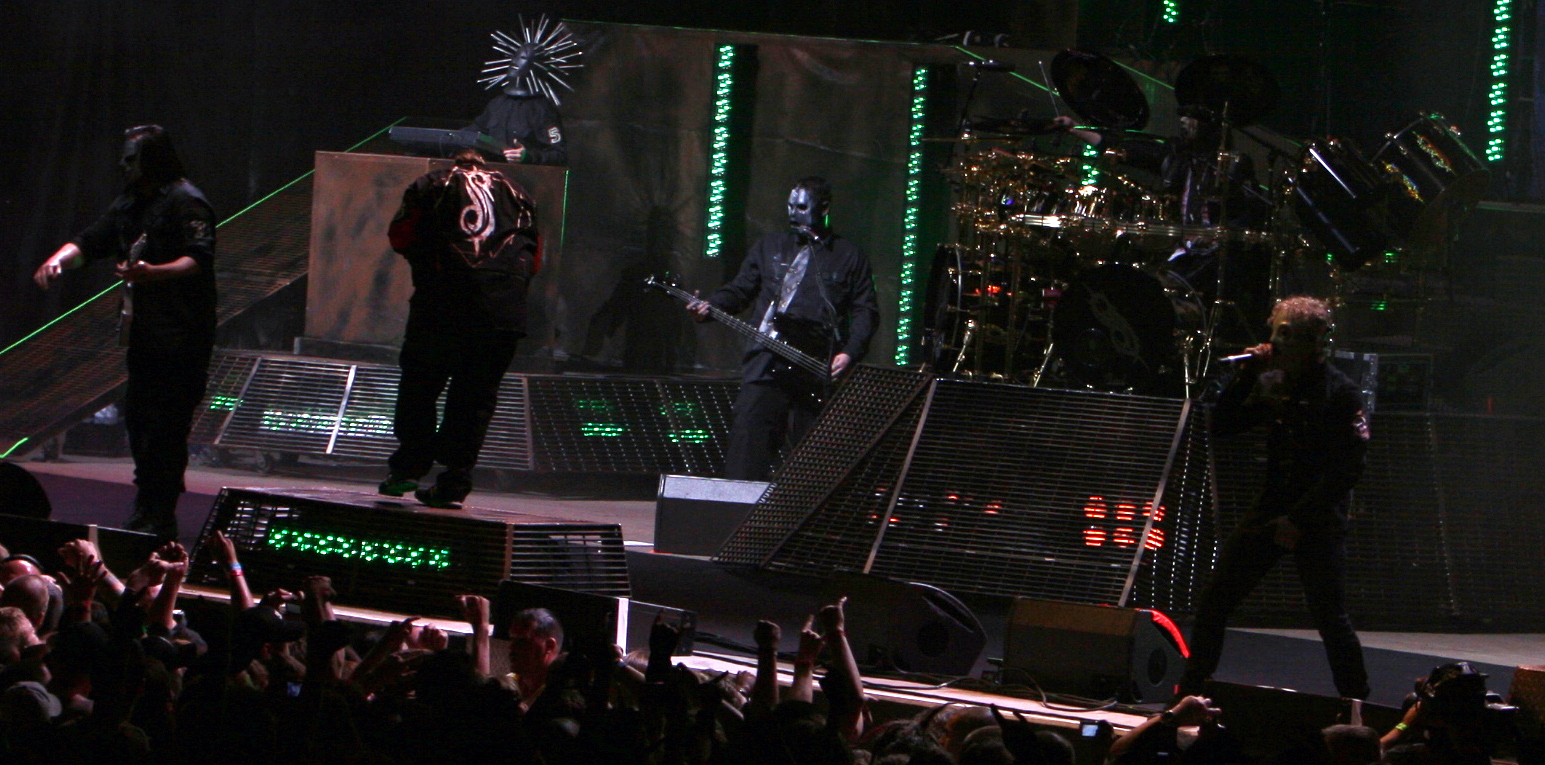
Slipknot performing at the White River Amphitheatre on July 9, 2008 From left to right: Mick Thomson, Shawn Crahan, Craig Jones, Paul Gray, Joey Jordison, Corey Taylor

=== Critical reception ===
Critics noted the band's energy and on-stage presence during their Mayhem Festival sets. Matt Weitz credited the band's use of the stage in Dallas, saying they were "severe in their presentation." When reviewing the show at Burgettstown, Pennsylvania, Justin Jacobs said Slipknot "[delivered] the pummeling performance the whole crowd had been waiting for", while noting that part of Slipknot's appeal was their secrecy, referring to the band's use of masks and aliases and the fact that a curtain was used to hide the stage while it was set up.

== Cancelled European dates ==
At the end of the 2008 Mayhem Festival, drummer Joey Jordison broke his ankle. During an interview with Drummer, Jordison explained that the injury happened when he and a friend were "messing around and kinda wrestling with each other" one afternoon, and Jordison tripped and twisted his ankle. Despite the injury, Jordison could still walk and subsequently played the next night. However, during a lengthy double bass section of "The Blister Exists" he "felt a snap" in his ankle. A doctor confirmed he had broken his ankle and suggested surgery. Jordison continued to play with a broken ankle until the band finished the Mayhem Festival. Following the festival Jordison was told that if he continued to play, he could permanently damage his ability to walk. Subsequently, Slipknot were forced to cancel their European festival appearances due to the injury. On August 22, at Leeds Festival during the Dropkick Murphys performance, a plane flew above the open air crowd advertising tickets for Slipknot's UK dates in December. Unhappy with the fact that the band had pulled out of the festival, the crowd began to boo at the banner advert.

=== Tour dates ===
Date	City	Country	Venue
August 22, 2008	Leeds	England	~~Reading and Leeds Festivals~~
August 24, 2008	Reading	England	~~Reading and Leeds Festivals~~
August 26, 2008	Paris	France	~~Le Trabendo (Virgin 17 showcase)~~
August 27, 2008	Hamburg	Germany	~~Grosse Freiheit 36 (MTV showcase)~~
August 29, 2008	Wiesen	Austria	~~Ewean Festival~~
August 31, 2008	Lüdinghausen	Germany	~~Area 4 Festival~~

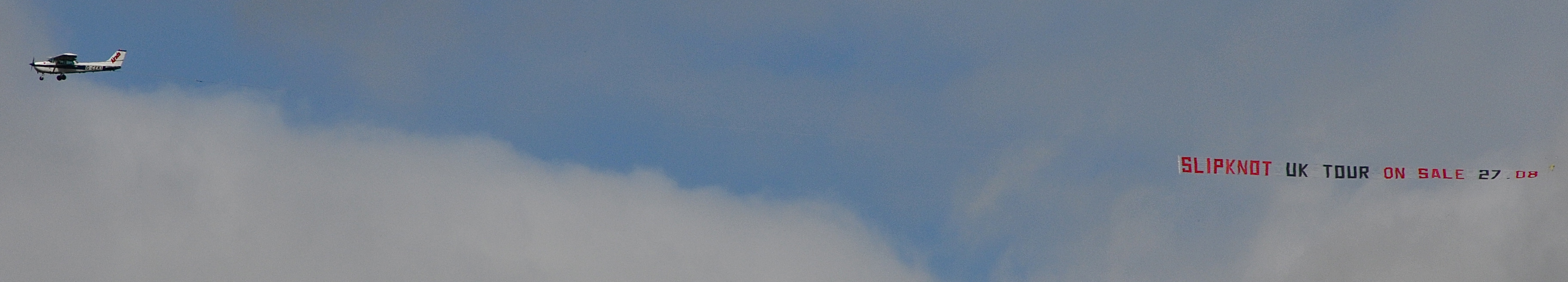
A plane with a banner advert for Slipknot's December tour of the UK flew above crowds at festivals at which they canceled their appearances.

== Japanese leg ==
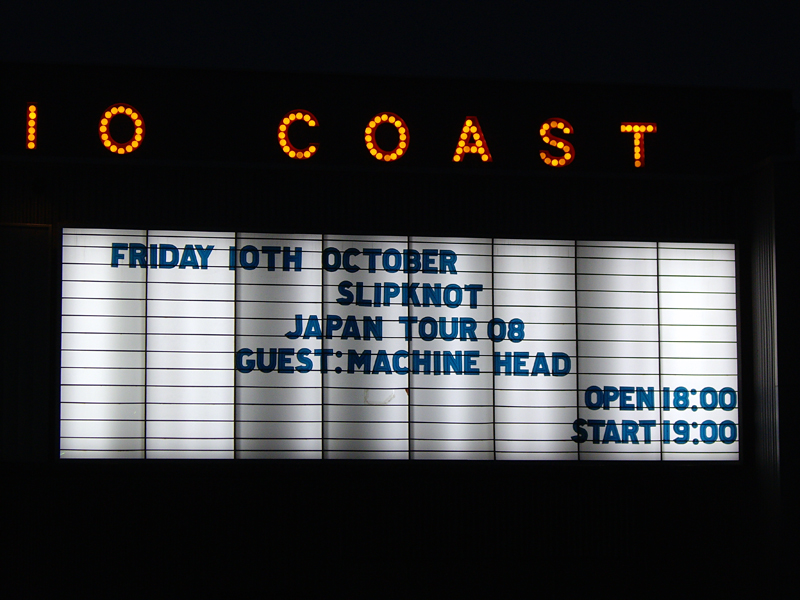
A sign for Slipknot's first of two shows at the Studio Coast in Tokyo, Japan

During an interview prior to the Japanese leg of the tour, percussionist Shawn Crahan discussed the difference between Japanese audiences and Western audiences. When asked whether he believed that Japanese fans are less intense, he said it is a matter of opinion for bands and when Slipknot play, "it's almost frightening how in to it they are." However, he did note that between songs can be "very awkward" because the crowd is almost silent, whereas the band is used to a more energetic reception.

=== Tour dates ===
Date	City	Country	Venue
Supported by: Machine Head
October 8, 2008	Nagoya	Japan	Zepp
October 10, 2008	Tokyo	Japan	Studio Coast
October 11, 2008	Tokyo	Japan	Studio Coast
October 14, 2008	Osaka	Japan	Zepp
October 15, 2008	Osaka	Japan	Zepp
October 16, 2008	Sendai	Japan	Zepp
With: Avenged Sevenfold, Dragonforce, Mötley Crüe and others
October 18, 2008	Tokyo	Japan	Loud Park Festival

== Australian/New Zealand leg ==
The Australian leg of the All Hope Is Gone World Tour was the first time Slipknot were able to bring what percussionist Shawn Crahan described as "the real set, the real deal" to an Australian audience. The band travelled with over 11 tons of equipment, including hydraulic drum risers, percussionist rigs, pyrotechnics, lighting and stage set-ups. During an interview prior to the band's first show of this leg, vocalist Corey Taylor revealed that he had sprained his thumb the day before while sky-diving; however, the injury did not prevent him from performing.

=== Tour dates ===
Date	City	Country	Venue
Supported by: Machine Head and Sydonia
October 22, 2008	Auckland	New Zealand	Trusts Stadium
October 24, 2008	Brisbane	Australia	Riverstage
October 26, 2008	Sydney	Australia	Acer Arena
October 27, 2008	Melbourne	Australia	Rod Laver Arena
October 28, 2008	Adelaide	Australia	Jubilee Pavilion
October 29, 2008	Central Coast	Australia	Central Coast Stadium
October 30, 2008	Perth	Australia	Robinson Pavilion

=== Critical reception ===
Reviewing the band's show in Auckland, Chris Schulz wrote that vocalist Taylor's performance was "schizophrenic" and that his "unpredictable, passive-aggressive nature" was the focal point of Slipknot's live show. He also declared percussionist Crahan the "most menacing member of Slipknot", noting that in a "particularly violent" version of "Duality" he "appeared pleased to play his part in the song by violating an empty keg with a baseball bat." When reviewing the same show, Scott Kara of The New Zealand Herald compared Slipknot's performance to their appearance at the 2005 Big Day Out festival, noting that "the gruesome obscenities, the vomiting, and fights" were absent, which made for "a far tighter and more solid" performance. Kara also commented upon the connection the fans had with the show, saying that in songs like "The Heretic Anthem" Taylor "hardly needs to sing" due to the involvement of the audience.

== European leg ==
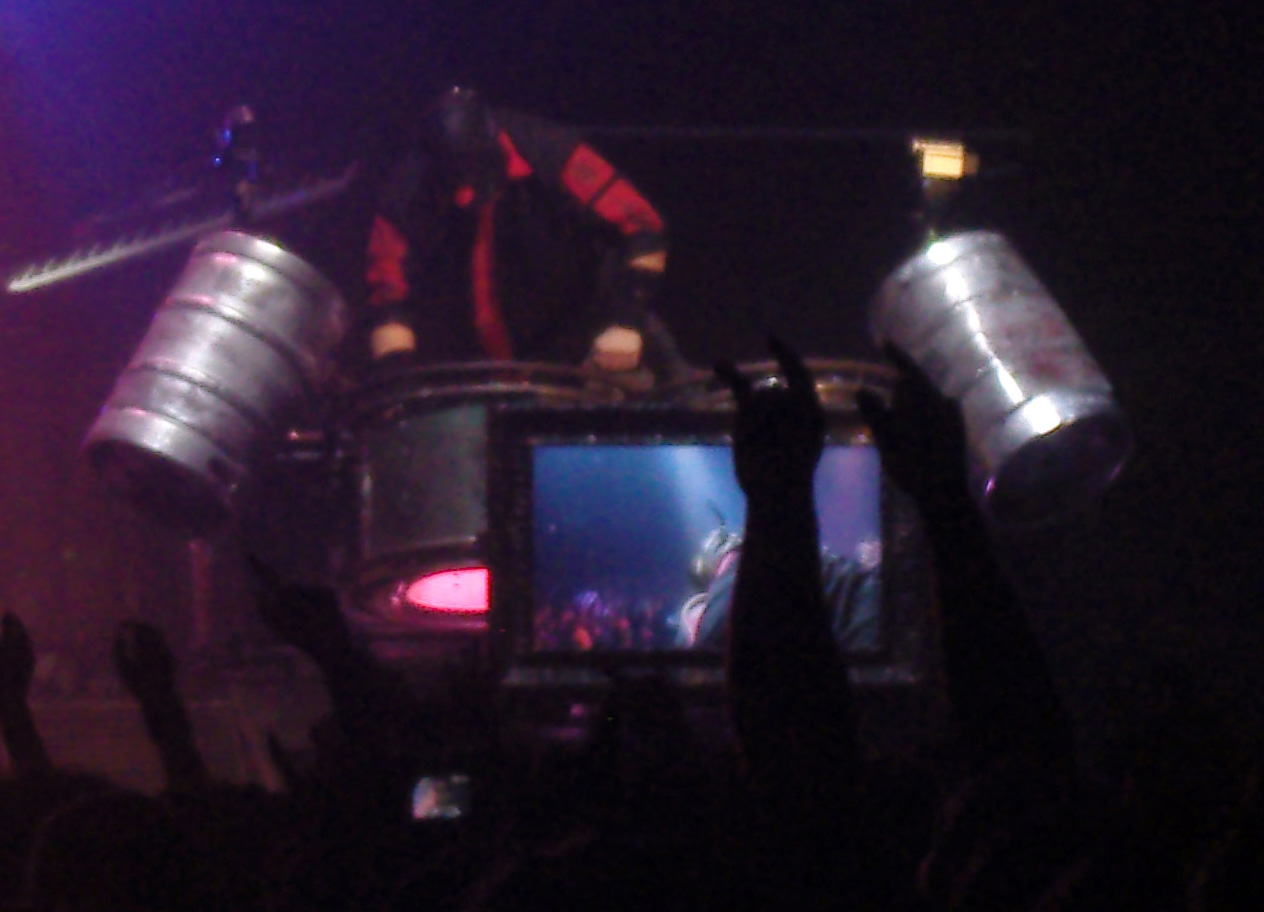
Shawn Crahan performing in Sheffield, England. His hydraulic percussion platform has been called a particular highlight of their performances.

The opening date of the European leg of the tour was to have been the first time in Slipknot's history that would perform in Israel; however, due to "sudden personal and family conflicts", the band canceled their appearance. The band stated that they will perform in Israel in the future. The band's appearance in Moscow marked Slipknot's first performance in Russia. During an interview with Kerrang! prior to their appearances in the UK, percussionist Crahan expressed excitement for the upcoming dates, saying, "There's always been a deep love and affection between the British fans and ourselves." Machine Head did not perform in Copenhagen on November 13, due to frontman Robb Flynn's "severe throat and bronchial infection." On December 12, in Sheffield, Machine Head guitarist Phil Demmel collapsed on stage during their second to last song, forcing his band to cancel their appearances at the European leg's final two dates. Slipknot's performance in London on December 3, 2008, was recorded for MTV's World Stage series and aired on March 13, 2009, in the UK. It was also made available in over 160 countries.

=== Tour dates ===
Date	City	Country	Venue
Supported by: Machine Head and Children of Bodom
November 2, 2008	Tel Aviv	Israel	~~Hangar No. 1~~
November 5, 2008	Moscow	Russia	Olimpiysky
November 7, 2008	Helsinki	Finland	Old Ice Hall
November 8, 2008	Tampere	Finland	Ice Hall
November 10, 2008	Oslo	Norway	Oslo Spektrum
November 12, 2008	Stockholm	Sweden	Hovet
Supported by: Children of Bodom
November 13, 2008	Copenhagen	Denmark	K.B. Hallen
Supported by: Machine Head and Children of Bodom
November 15, 2008	Berlin	Germany	Treptow Arena
November 17, 2008	Winterthur	Switzerland	Eishalle Deutweg
November 18, 2008	Milan	Italy	Palasharp
November 20, 2008	Amsterdam	Netherlands	Heineken Music Hall
November 21, 2008	Paris	France	Le Zénith
November 22, 2008	Paris	France	Le Zénith
November 24, 2008	Düsseldorf	Germany	Philipshalle
November 25, 2008	Offenbach am Main	Germany	Stadthalle Offenbach
November 26, 2008	Stuttgart	Germany	Schleyerhalle
November 28, 2008	Vienna	Austria	Wiener Stadthalle
November 29, 2008	Munich	Germany	Zenith
December 1, 2008	London	England	Hammersmith Apollo
December 2, 2008	London	England	Hammersmith Apollo
December 3, 2008	London	England	Hammersmith Apollo
December 5, 2008	Cardiff	Wales	Cardiff International Arena
December 7, 2008	Birmingham	England	NIA
December 8, 2008	Glasgow	Scotland	SECC
December 9, 2008	Manchester	England	MEN Arena
December 11, 2008	Newcastle	England	Metro Radio Arena
December 12, 2008	Sheffield	England	Sheffield Arena
Supported by: Children of Bodom
December 14, 2008	Antwerp	Belgium	Lotto Arena
December 15, 2008	Alzette	Luxembourg	Rockhal

=== Critical reception ===
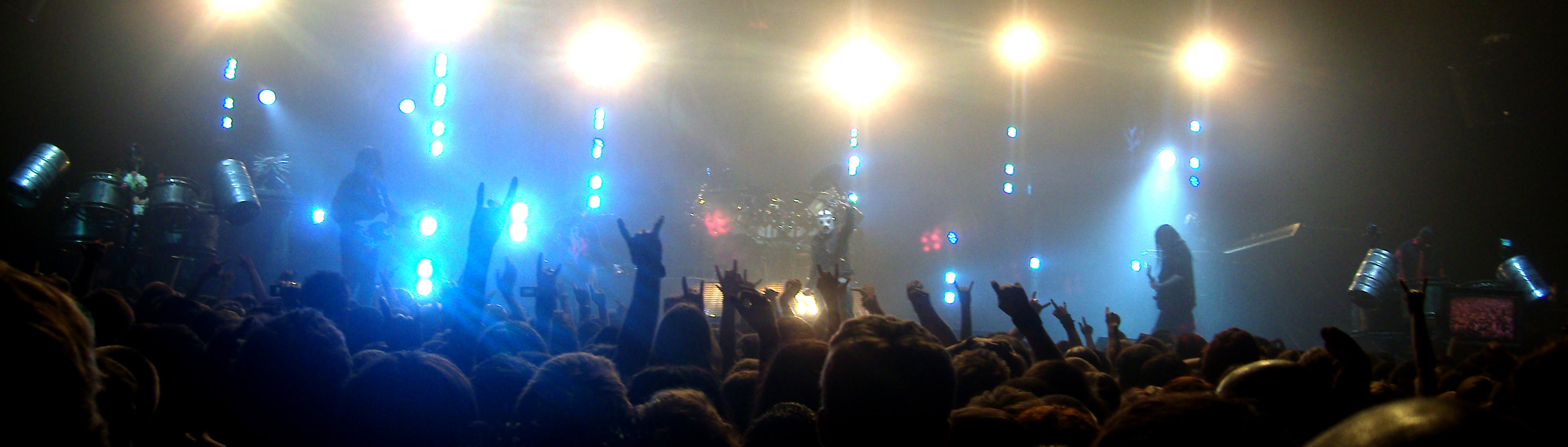
Slipknot performing in Sheffield Arena on December 12, 2008 From left to right: Chris Fehn, Craig Jones, Jim Root, Paul Gray, Joey Jordison, Corey Taylor, Mick Thomson, Sid Wilson, Shawn Crahan

When reviewing Slipknot's show in Düsseldorf, Sebastian Huhn called Shawn Crahan's hydraulic percussion platform as a highlight of the performance. However, he also said, "Even though the tour had been named after the new album, the most part of the set consisted of tracks from the previous releases." Huhn rated Slipknot's overall performance 8 out of 10. Alistair Lawrence of Kerrang! reviewed the first of the band's three shows at the Hammersmith Apollo in London. He said, "The choreographed chaos is too multi-faceted to fully describe", and noted that Taylor's performance made songs like "Before I Forget" and "Psychosocial" sound better than on the recorded versions. Overall, Lawrence scored the show 4 out of 5. When reviewing one of the Hammersmith Apollo shows, Rick Pearson of the Evening Standard wrote that there was "a strong feeling of camaraderie" at the concert. While he admitted he did not understand the draw of the band, "Spit It Out" offered "glimpses as to what got the maggots hooked on this brutal, bludgeoning band." Adrian Osmond of Western Mail said that their show in Cardiff was "a pretty flawless, colourful and exciting piece of musical theatre", adding that on entertainment value it would "rival any of the pantomimes out there this month."

== US Arena leg ==
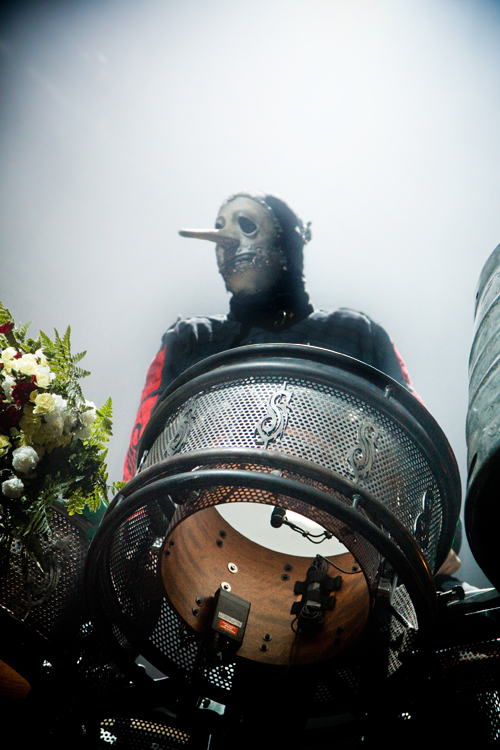
Chris Fehn performing at the Allstate Arena in Illinois on January 30, 2009

During an interview with The Pulse of Radio, vocalist Taylor said that Slipknot would be changing their stage set around for the US arena leg. "We're getting away from the pyro. We're going way more visual this time. We're incorporating a lot of video." He explained that they always try to do something different: "We've got people still coming to see us for, you know, after ten years, and we just want to try and give something special." On the opening show of the leg, percussionist Crahan debuted a new mask which was significantly different from the one he wore while touring in 2008.

During their show on January 25 in Council Bluffs, Iowa, a member of the audience collapsed from a heart attack and was later declared dead in hospital.

=== Tour dates ===
Date	City	Country	Venue
Supported by: Coheed and Cambria and Trivium
January 23, 2009	Saint Paul	United States	Xcel Energy Center
January 24, 2009	Kansas City	United States	Sprint Center
January 25, 2009	Council Bluffs	United States	Mid-America Center
January 27, 2009	Madison	United States	Alliant Energy Center
January 28, 2009	Des Moines	United States	Wells Fargo Arena
January 30, 2009	Rosemont	United States	Allstate Arena
January 31, 2009	Auburn Hills	United States	The Palace of Auburn Hills
February 2, 2009	Peoria	United States	Peoria Civic Center
February 3, 2009	Indianapolis	United States	Pepsi Coliseum
February 5, 2009	New York City	United States	Madison Square Garden
February 6, 2009	Lowell	United States	Tsongas Arena
February 7, 2009	Camden	United States	Susquehanna Bank Center
February 9, 2009	Greensboro	United States	Greensboro Coliseum
February 10, 2009	Charlotte	United States	Cricket Arena
February 11, 2009	Greenville	United States	BI-LO Center
February 13, 2009	Baltimore	United States	1st Mariner Arena
February 14, 2009	Lexington	United States	Rupp Arena
February 15, 2009	Nashville	United States	Sommet Center
February 17, 2009	Duluth	United States	Gwinnett Center
February 18, 2009	Orlando	United States	UCF Arena
February 19, 2009	Pensacola	United States	Pensacola Civic Center
February 21, 2009	Corpus Christi	United States	Concrete Street Amphitheater
February 22, 2009	Grand Prairie	United States	Nokia Theatre
February 23, 2009	Tulsa	United States	BOK Center
February 25, 2009	Houston	United States	Verizon Wireless Theater
February 26, 2009	Houston	United States	Verizon Wireless Theater
February 28, 2009	El Paso	United States	El Paso County Coliseum
March 1, 2009	San Antonio	United States	Freeman Coliseum
March 3, 2009	Denver	United States	Denver Coliseum
March 4, 2009	Albuquerque	United States	Tingley Coliseum
March 5, 2009	Glendale	United States	Jobing.com Arena
March 7, 2009	Inglewood	United States	The Forum
March 8, 2009	San Diego	United States	Cox Arena
March 10, 2009	Ontario	United States	Citizens Business Bank Arena
March 11, 2009	Sacramento	United States	ARCO Arena

=== Critical reception ===
News-Press & Gazette Company reviewer Shea Conner said that he could not understand why anybody would buy a seat to a Slipknot concert. Saying "the madness is part of the experience", he added that he himself was "ten feet from the stage with [his] head up and elbows, too." While championing the band as "one of the greatest bands in the world to see live", Conner wrote, "their antics and on-stage spectacle match their ability to get the crowd in a frenzy." Conner noted that due to their large line-up "a few [members] can take a song or two off to entertain the fans," citing events like percussionist Chris Fehn mocking a security guard, DJ Sid Wilson destroying a part of Fehn's drumkit, and Shawn Crahan's hydraulic drumkit with camera-operated screen as particular examples. Katjusa Cisar of The Capital Times reviewed Slipknot's show at the Alliant Energy Center, saying that despite their "satanic" reputation they put on "a pretty wholesome show." She noted that throughout their ten years together they have "honed a show of ferocious, squealing intensity; an unholy racket full of adolescent rage and goofy humor under a phalanx of moving and flashing lights." Crediting frontman Corey Taylor's ability to "[lead] his mutant army and the passionate crowd", she said the crowd kept the energy high and that "mosh pits erupted like mini-hurricanes."

== Canadian leg ==
Percussionist Shawn Crahan left the tour to return home after performing on the opening date of the tour's Canadian leg. Slipknot continued the tour without him. While addressing their crowd during their May 1, 2009, concert in Toronto, Taylor explained that Crahan's absence was due to "a very terrible, terrible predicament going on in [Crahan's] family." The band later stated that Crahan's absence was due to the death of his mother.

=== Tour dates ===
Date	City	Country	Venue
Supported by: Trivium and 3 Inches of Blood
April 28, 2009	Quebec City	Canada	Pavillon de la Jeunesse
April 29, 2009	Montreal	Canada	Bell Centre
May 1, 2009	Toronto	Canada	Ricoh Coliseum
May 2, 2009	London	Canada	John Labbatt Centre

=== Critical reception ===
In his review of Slipknot's show on April 29, 2009, for the Montreal Gazette, Al Kratina said, "Their stage show is something to behold." He said, "Not only are [their] songs [...] absolutely crushing in a live setting, but the band is a fountain of bizarre, chaotic energy." Describing vocalist Corey Taylor's performance, he said, "Despite his manic energy [he] managed to keep his vocals tightly controlled, alternating between furious screaming and melodic passages". While reviewing their Toronto show on May 1, 2009, for CANOE, Jason MacNeil noted the absence of percussionist Crahan, although in noting that several other members would occasionally occupy the vacant drum kit, he added, "It didn't seem to matter much to the fans." He also said, "For the most part, Slipknot kept the energy high" and added that tracks like "Dead Memories" and "Vermilion" were the only moments "which served as breathers." Overall MacNeil rated the show 3.5 out of 5.

== US leg III ==
After missing six shows due to his mother's death, percussionist Shawn Crahan returned to the tour. His first appearance since April 28, 2009, was in Oklahoma City on May 8, 2009.

=== Tour dates ===
Date	City	Country	Venue
Supported by: DevilDriver and 3 Inches of Blood
May 3, 2009	Grand Rapids	United States	Van Andel Arena
May 5, 2009	Springfield	United States	Prairie Capital Convention Center
May 6, 2009	St. Louis	United States	Scottrade Center
With: Korn, The Used, All That Remains and others
May 8, 2009	Oklahoma City	United States	Zoo Amphitheatre
With: Staind, Chevelle, Drowning Pool and others
May 9, 2009	North Little Rock	United States	Cooper Farm (Edge Fest)
Supported by: DevilDriver and All That Remains
May 10, 2009	Park City	United States	Hartman Arena
With: Korn, The Used, Clutch and others
May 12, 2009	Sioux Falls	United States	Canaries Stadium (KRRO Fest)
Supported by: DevilDriver and All That Remains
May 13, 2009	Mankato	United States	Alltel Center
May 14, 2009	Cedar Rapids	United States	U.S. Cellular Center
With: Alice in Chains, Avenged Sevenfold, Korn, Mötley Crüe and others
May 16, 2009	Columbus	United States	Crew Stadium

=== Critical reception ===
While reviewing their show on May 3, 2009, at the Van Andel Arena, Troy Reimink made a point of Crahan's absence, suggesting that while it could have seriously disrupted the tour, it seemed like "merely a bump in the road for Slipknot." Reimink said the band's 17 song setlist, featuring songs from all their albums, "demonstrated the group's skill at assembling relentlessly aggressive songs punctuated with fleeting, occasionally incongruous bits of melody." While noting that Slipknot were "not [his] thing", he described the show as "an exercise in finely calculated chaos", rating the show 2.5 out of 4. Diana Nollen of The Gazette reviewed Slipknot's show in Cedar Rapids, Iowa, describing their stage show as a "sophisticated sideshow of garish masks and growling lyrics." Nollen made a note of their on-stage antics saying that "it's rather entertaining as they lumber across the stage and climb on each other's percussion stations like baboons from hell." Citing the singles "Before I Forget" and "Psychosocial" as particular highlights of the setlist, she concluded her review by saying that the "final visual punch" of drummer Joey Jordison's kit raising, tipping and rotating above the stage was like "a demented version of an Adventureland ride."

== European leg II ==
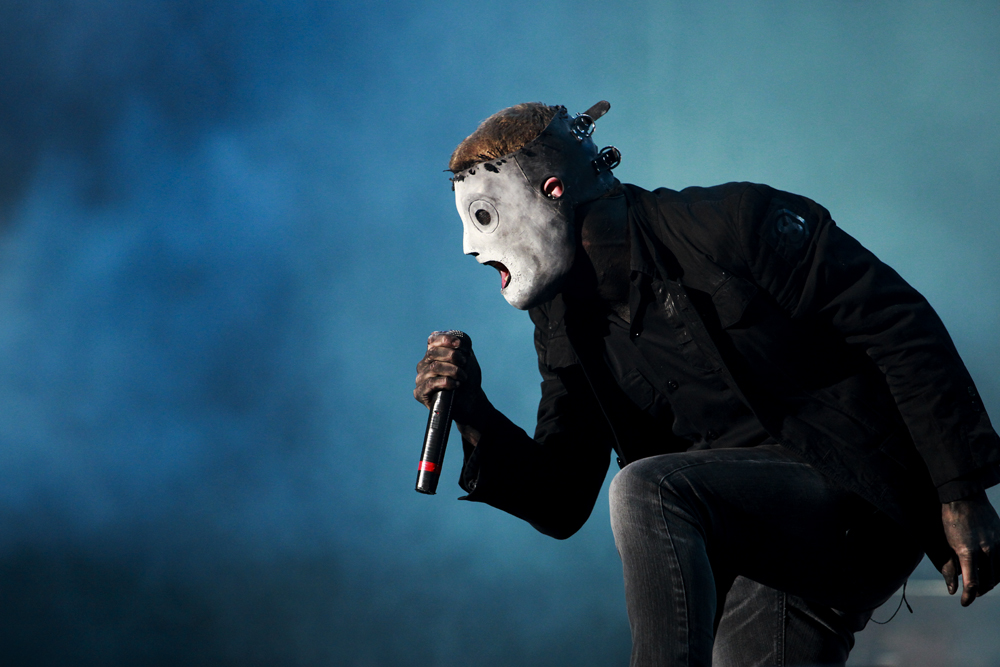
Vocalist Corey Taylor performing at Alive festival in 2009

Slipknot's performance on June 13, 2009, at Download Festival was streamed live on the internet, along with various other acts performing at the festival. During an interview prior to their performance on June 20, 2009, in the Netherlands, percussionist Chris Fehn revealed that he suspected he had broken his hand. He did not say when the injury happened, but he did explain, "I lost a stick at a show and got a bit mad about it." Towards the end of the leg, Fehn left the tour due to a "tragic death in his family", which forced him to miss the final two dates in Spain. Additionally, Sid Wilson was absent from the Rock Am Ring show.

=== Tour dates ===
Date	City	Country	Venue
June 6, 2009	Nürburgring	Germany	Rock am Ring and Rock im Park
June 7, 2009	Nuremberg	Germany	Rock am Ring and Rock im Park
June 9, 2009	Warsaw	Poland	Torwar Hall
June 10, 2009	Ostrava	Czech Republic	ČEZ Aréna
June 13, 2009	Donington Park	England	Download Festival
June 14, 2009	Interlaken	Switzerland	Greenfield Festival
June 16, 2009	Zagreb	Croatia	Dom Sportova
June 17, 2009	Belgrade	Serbia	Belgrade Arena
June 19, 2009	Nickelsdorf	Austria	Nova Rock Festival
June 20, 2009	Nijmegen	Netherlands	Sonisphere at Goffert Park
June 24, 2009	Arendal	Norway	Hove Festival
June 26, 2009	Gothenburg	Sweden	Metaltown
June 27, 2009	Dessel	Belgium	Graspop Metal Meeting
June 28, 2009	Milan	Italy	Gods of Metal
June 30, 2009	Athens	Greece	Rockwave Festival
July 3, 2009	Turku	Finland	Ruisrock
July 4, 2009	Roskilde	Denmark	Roskilde Festival
July 5, 2009	Belfort	France	Eurockéennes
July 7, 2009	Santiago	Spain	Pavillón Multiusos Fontes do Sar
July 9, 2009	Lisbon	Portugal	Alive Festival
July 10, 2009	Madrid	Spain	Palacio de los Deportes
July 11, 2009	Barcelona	Spain	Sonisphere at Barcelona Forum
July 16, 2009	Zagreb	Croatia	Dom sportova

=== Critical reception ===
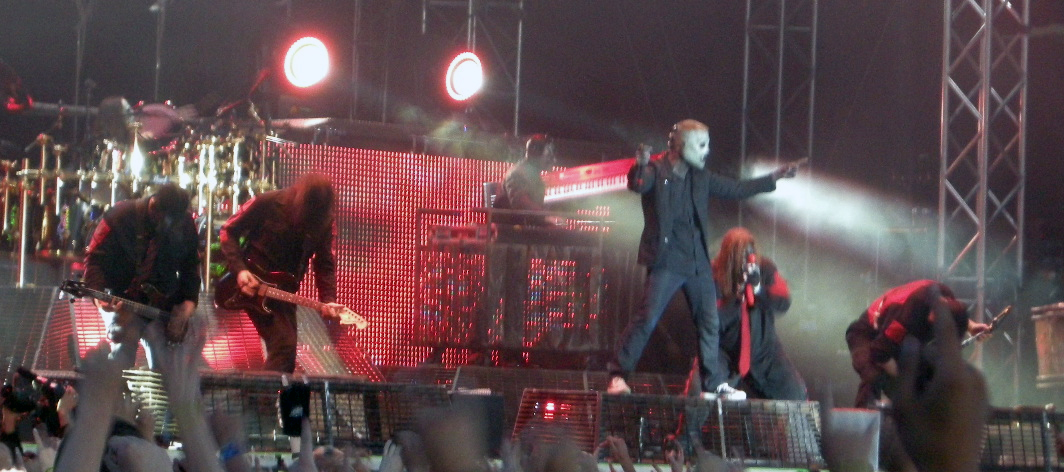
Slipknot performing at Metal Town Festival on June 26, 2009 From left to right: Joey Jordison, Paul Gray, Jim Root, Sid Wilson, Corey Taylor, Shawn Crahan, Mick Thomson

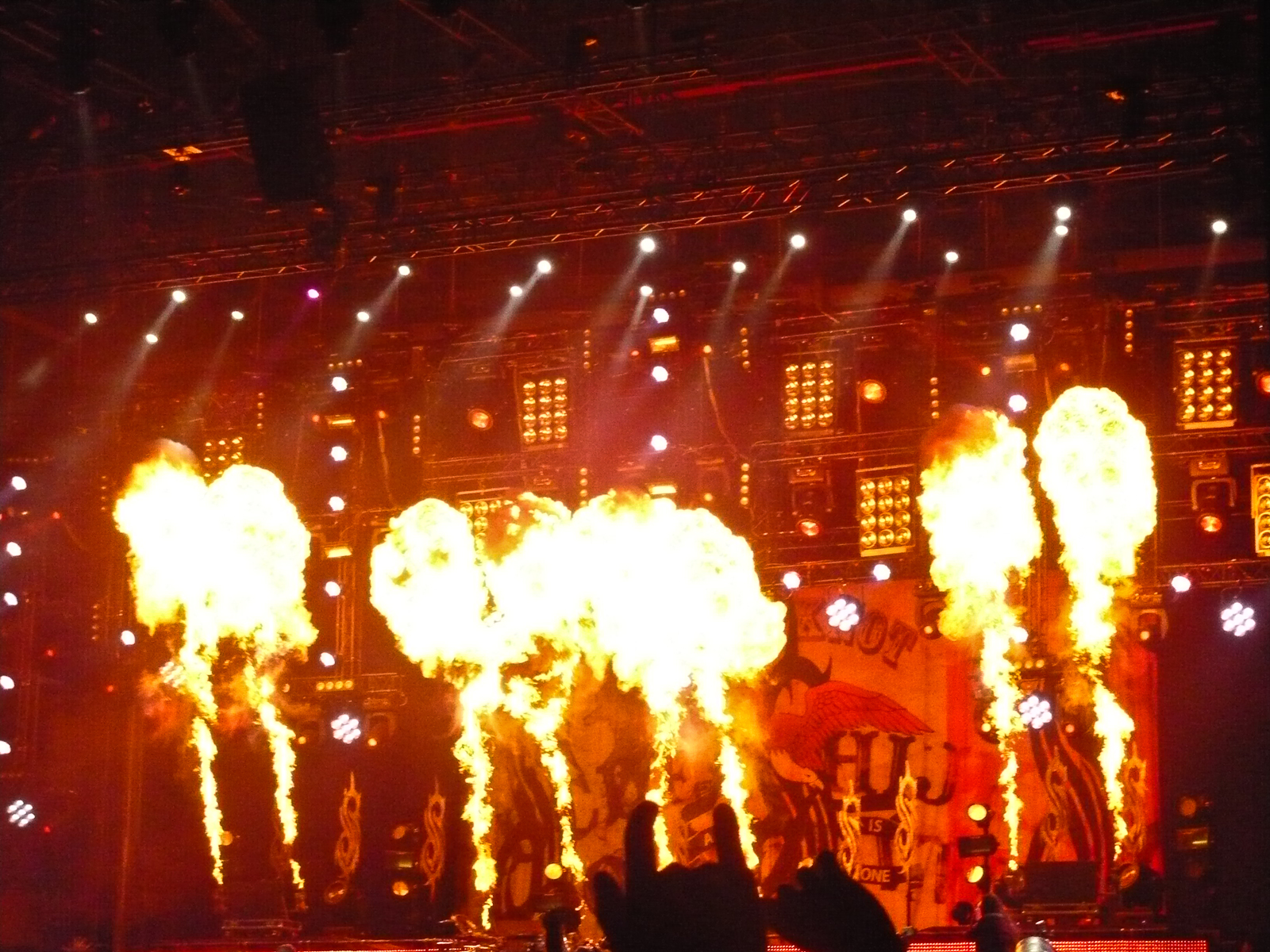
Greg Cochrane of the BBC noted the flame cannons used by Slipknot as a particular highlight.

Several reporters reviewed Slipknot's headlining slot at England's Download Festival on June 13, 2009. Greg Cochrane, writing for the BBC, championed Slipknot as "spectacular headliners", explaining: "Flame throwers, pneumatic drum kits and mass screaming, it has it all." NME said Slipknot's performance "saw the Main Stage become a scene of chaos", noting how the band members "roamed the stage randomly smashing the set up with baseball bats, throwing barrels around and hanging off [Crahan's] revolving drumkit." Christa Ktorides of Clickmusic said, "The sight of 70,000 people sitting down on command is something we won't long forget." She also described their performance as "simply ferocious." Metal Hammer reviewer Ted Bezer called it "arguably the greatest headline performance of the Download era", adding, "Slipknot absolutely destroyed 70,000 people in a way that it didn't seem was possible." He declared the performance of "Duality" the best moment at the whole festival.

== Canceled US dates ==
Anthrax was initially announced as the main support band on this leg of the tour. However, due to the departure of vocalist Dan Nelson, Anthrax were forced to cancel most of their touring dates, including all dates on this tour.

On August 22, 2009, Slipknot canceled their appearance at the KISW Pain In The Grass event due to Jordison being rushed to hospital hours before their set was scheduled to start. Despite planning to return for the following date in Kennewick, Washington, Slipknot again canceled their appearance hours before their performance. Slipknot also canceled their remaining dates on the tour due to Jordison's health, promising to reschedule the first two dates.

On September 9, 2009, Slipknot planned on commemorating the 10-year anniversary of their debut album Slipknot by hosting a one-day festival in their hometown. Slipknot were to headline the festival, which would host two stages, the second stage showcasing local bands. However, the festival was canceled shortly after it was announced, for unknown reasons.

Tour dates

Date	City	Country	Venue
Supported by: Anthrax
August 22, 2009	Seattle	United States	~~White River Amphitheater~~
August 23, 2009	Kennewick	United States	~~Toyota Center~~
August 25, 2009	Great Falls	United States	~~Four Seasons Arena~~
August 26, 2009	Billings	United States	~~Metra Park Arena~~
August 28, 2009	Boise	United States	~~Quest Arena~~
August 29, 2009	Salt Lake City	United States	~~The E Center~~
August 31, 2009	Colorado Springs	United States	~~Colorado Springs World Arena~~
September 1, 2009	Casper	United States	~~Casper Events Center~~
September 3, 2009	Fargo	United States	~~Fargodome~~
September 4, 2009	Rochester	United States	~~Mayo Civic Center~~
September 5, 2009	Milwaukee	United States	~~Eagles Ballroom~~
September 9, 2009	Des Moines	United States	~~One-Day Festival~~

== US, Canadian leg ==
As previously promised by the band, Slipknot rescheduled their first canceled appearances in Washington from August, allowing all previous ticket holders the opportunity to attend.

=== Tour dates ===
Date	City	Country	Venue
Supported by: 3 Inches of Blood
October 10, 2009	Auburn	United States	White River Amphitheatre
October 11, 2009	Kennewick	United States	Toyota Center
Supported by: Deftones
October 13, 2009	Portland	United States	Memorial Coliseum
October 15, 2009	Vancouver	Canada	Pacific Coliseum
October 16, 2009	Victoria	Canada	Save-On-Foods Memorial Centre
October 18, 2009	Edmonton	Canada	Shaw Conference Centre
October 20, 2009	Calgary	Canada	Calgary Corral
October 21, 2009	Spokane	United States	Star Theater
October 23, 2009	San Jose	United States	The Event Center Arena
Cypress Hill Smokeout: Deftones, Cypress Hill, Sublime, Kottonmouth Kings
October 24, 2009	San Bernardino	United States	San Manuel Amphitheater
Supported By: Vision of Disorder
October 29, 2009	Los Angeles	United States	Hollywood Palladium
October 30, 2009	Los Angeles	United States	Jimmy Kimmel Live!
October 31, 2009	Las Vegas	United States	Pearl Concert Theater
