= Snuff (song) =

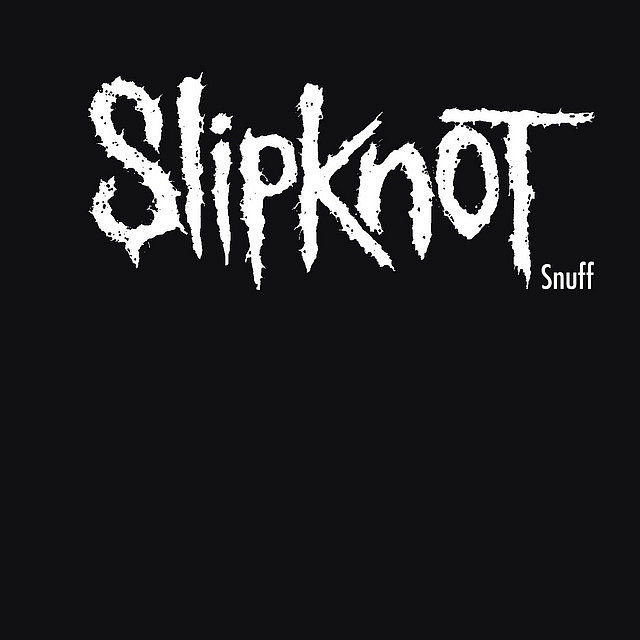

Single by Slipknot

from the album All Hope Is Gone
- A-side: "Snuff" (radio edit)
- B-side: "Snuff" (album version)
- Released: September 28, 2009
- Recorded: 2008
- Studio: Sound Farm (Jamaica, Iowa)
- Genre: Alternative rock
- Length: 4:36 (album version); 4:12 (radio edit)
- Label: Roadrunner
- Songwriter: Corey Taylor
- Producers: Dave Fortman; Slipknot

Slipknot singles chronology
"Sulfur" (2009)	"Snuff" (2009)	"The Negative One" (2014)

Music video
- "Snuff" on YouTube

"Snuff" is a song by American heavy metal band Slipknot. A ballad, the song was released on September 28, 2009, as the fifth and final single from their fourth studio album, All Hope Is Gone (2008). It peaked at No. 2 on Billboard's Mainstream Rock chart, their highest chart placement to date, surpassing "Dead Memories".

It is the final single released from the band with original bassist Paul Gray before his death eight months after its release and drummer Joey Jordison before his departure in 2013 and death in 2021. In subsequent solo acoustic shows, Corey Taylor performed an acoustic version of "Snuff" as a tribute to Gray.

== Background and writing ==
Slipknot drummer Joey Jordison recalled the song's conception: "Corey doesn't really write music for Slipknot – but, when he came over to hear the songs Paul [Gray, bassist] and I were working on for All Hope Is Gone, he showed me this... I had him lay a scratch track down in the studio. Then I went in late at night, without telling him, and laid down some drums... When he heard it the next day, he started crying. It's Corey's masterpiece."

Taylor said in 2021: "I get into arguments with fans all the time about this: everybody’s like, 'Oh, it’s just a leftover Stone Sour song.' No, I wrote that for Slipknot. I didn’t expect them to use it, to be honest, but I wrote it specifically for Slipknot, because it was regarding one of the heaviest times of my life." He also told Kerrang! in 2018 that the main reason the track ended up getting used was because Paul Gray had strongly advocated for its inclusion on the album. He said: "If Paul hadn’t championed that song, I don’t think we would have recorded it. But he loved it and saw the potential with it and really wanted us to do it."

== Composition and lyrics ==
Containing melodic singing, acoustic guitars and clean tones, "Snuff" is considered to be Slipknot's "softest" song. A sentimental ballad, the song was written about vocalist Corey Taylor's divorce. The track explores themes such as heartbreak and self loathing. According to him: "Not naming names, [but] it's about someone who helped me through a lot and I thought she felt the same way that I did and then she really let me down. At the same time, it was good that she did, because it was that final push to me figuring out myself. The lyrics are pretty self-explanatory." He would later recall in 2021: "It was one of the heaviest disappointments, one of the heaviest heartbreaks I had ever felt. It was one of those things where you knew you weren’t supposed to be together. There was just something there that felt so good and when it was ripped away from you, it just felt like there was a hole in your chest, and knowing that and having to discard those feelings was tough."

== Music video ==
It was announced on October 14, 2009 by Roadrunner Records that a music video with a high enough production quality to be considered a short film was to be released for "Snuff", which premiered on December 18, 2009 at 11:09 PM CST. It was co-directed by Shawn "Clown" Crahan and P. R. Brown, and features Malcolm McDowell and Ashley Laurence of Hellraiser fame. Corey Taylor is seen for the third time in a Slipknot video without his mask (the other two times being: "Dead Memories" and "Before I Forget") and is cross-dressed at the end of the short film.

== Reception and legacy ==
Roadrunner Records placed "Snuff" at number six for its greatest music videos of all time. The song was also nominated for Best Single at the Kerrang! Awards 2010, but lost to "Liquid Confidence" by You Me at Six.

In 2023, Jared Linen of Loudwire suggested Snuff could be "the saddest metal song of all time." That same year, an AI-generation version of the song featuring late Linkin Park vocalist Chester Bennington was released. Corey Taylor criticized the version, saying: "It’s cheap shit. I don’t know what it is about human beings — they keep fucking opening Pandora’s box for God’s sake. It’s scary, dude. I thought deep fake was bad and now here comes AI and all you do is teach this thing to do this or you type this thing to do that and all of a sudden it’s just there. [...] People have really got in the habit of stepping on graves and they don’t care. That’s what bothers me the most, this true apathy for anything other than their own needs. How fucking selfish do you need to be?"

== Track listing ==
Digital Download

1. "Snuff" – 4:26

US one-track Promo CD

1. "Snuff"

EU/US Promo CD

1. "Snuff" (radio edit) – 4:11
2. "Snuff" (album edit) – 4:26

== Personnel ==
Aside from their real names, members of the band are referred to by numbers zero through eight.

Slipknot

- (#8) Corey Taylor – lead vocals, acoustic guitar
- (#7) Mick Thomson – rhythm guitar
- (#6) Shawn Crahan – percussion, backing vocals, music video director
- (#5) Craig Jones – samples, media
- (#4) Jim Root – lead guitar
- (#3) Chris Fehn – percussion, backing vocals
- (#2) Paul Gray – bass
- (#1) Joey Jordison – drums
- (#0) Sid Wilson – turntables, keyboards

Production

- Dave Fortman – production
- Jeremy Parker – engineering
- Colin Richardson – mixing
- Matt Hyde – mix engineer
- Oli Wright – assistant engineer
- Ted Jensen – mastering

== Charts ==
=== Weekly charts ===
Weekly chart performance for "Snuff"
Chart (2009–2010)	Peak position
Canada Rock (Billboard)	12
US Bubbling Under Hot 100 (Billboard)	10
US Hot Rock & Alternative Songs (Billboard)	6

=== Year-end charts ===
Year-end chart performance for "Snuff"
Chart (2010)	Position
US Hot Rock & Alternative Songs (Billboard)	21

== Certifications ==
Certifications for "Snuff"
Region	Certification	Certified units/sales
Canada (Music Canada)	Platinum	80,000^{‡}
New Zealand (RMNZ)	Platinum	30,000^{‡}
United Kingdom (BPI)	Silver	200,000^{‡}
United States (RIAA)	Platinum	1,000,000^{‡}
^{‡} Sales+streaming figures based on certification alone.
