= Jamaica, Iowa =

- City
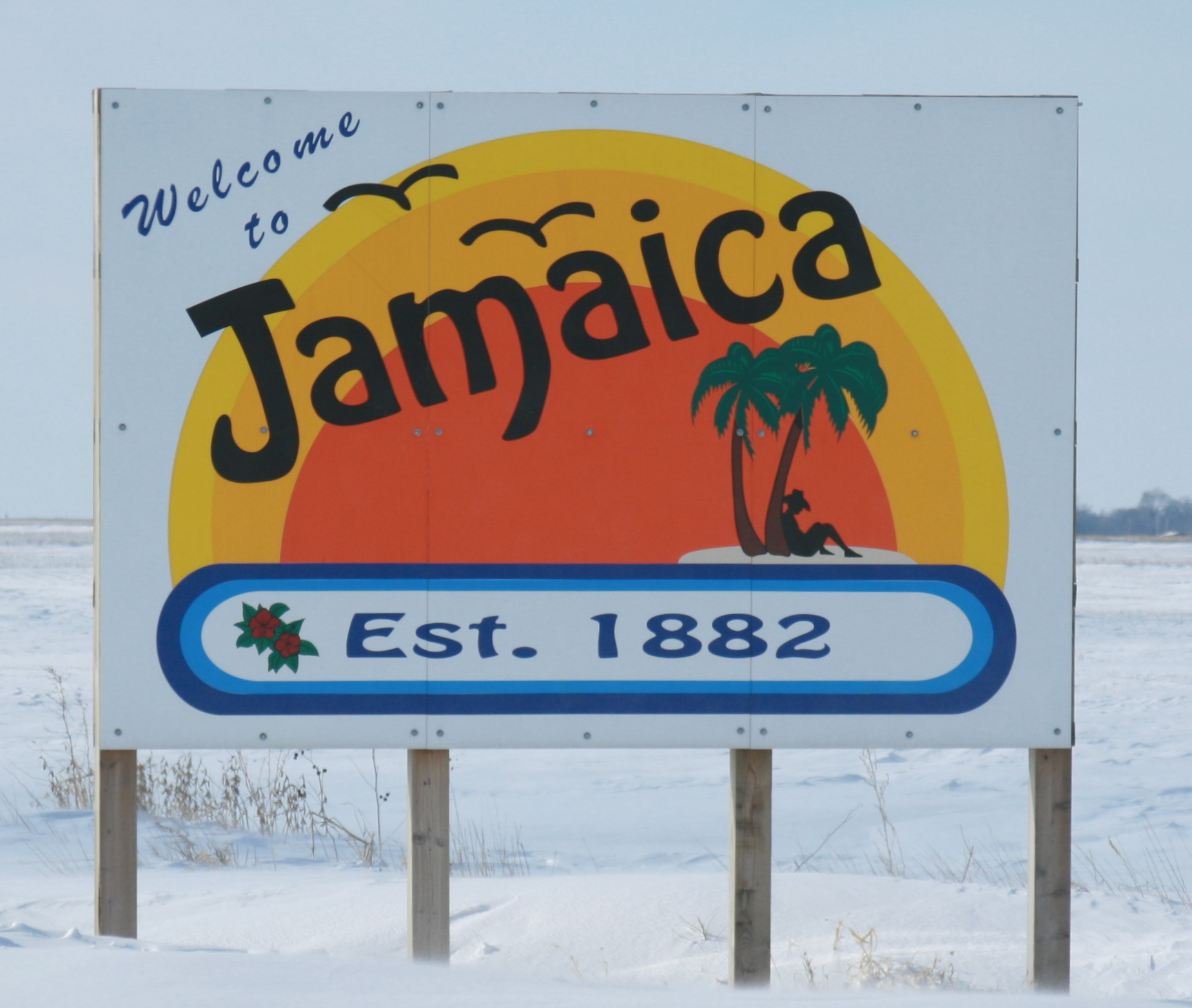
- A welcome sign in Jamaica

- Location of Jamaica, Iowa
- Coordinates: 41°50′43″N 94°18′25″W
- Country: USA
- State: Iowa
- County: Guthrie
- Established: 1882

Area
  - Total: 0.37 sq mi (0.96 km^{2})
  - Land: 0.37 sq mi (0.96 km^{2})
  - Water: 0 sq mi (0.00 km^{2})
- Elevation: 1,040 ft (320 m)

Population (2020)
  - Total: 195
  - Density: 523.7/sq mi (202.21/km^{2})
- Time zone: UTC-6 (Central (CST))
  - Summer (DST): UTC-5 (CDT)
- ZIP code: 50128
- Area code: 641
- FIPS code: 19-39225
- GNIS feature ID: 2395452

Jamaica is a city in Guthrie County, Iowa, United States. The population was 195 at the time of the 2020 census. It is part of the Des Moines–West Des Moines Metropolitan Statistical Area.

== History ==
Jamaica was platted in 1882.

A local historian named Bruce F. Towne published a short book entitled "Bricks on the Chimney", which discusses the origins and history of Jamaica. Towne was a local grocery store owner for several decades, a business founded by his father in the early 1900s. In March 1921, Maylen M. Heater was Jamaica's first traffic victim when his car overturned just west of town. He was the vice president of his father's bank. On July 4, 1919, Clarence Kinney and his son Guy tragically drowned in the high waters of the Raccoon River near the old saw mill. In 1921, the local garage was destroyed by fire when a local resident believed his Model T was leaking gas. He crawled under the automobile and lit a match, which resulted in an explosion. In the 1930s, the flu epidemic killed several local residents.

== Geography ==
According to the United States Census Bureau, the city has a total area of 0.46 square miles (1.19 km^{2}), all land.

== Demographics ==
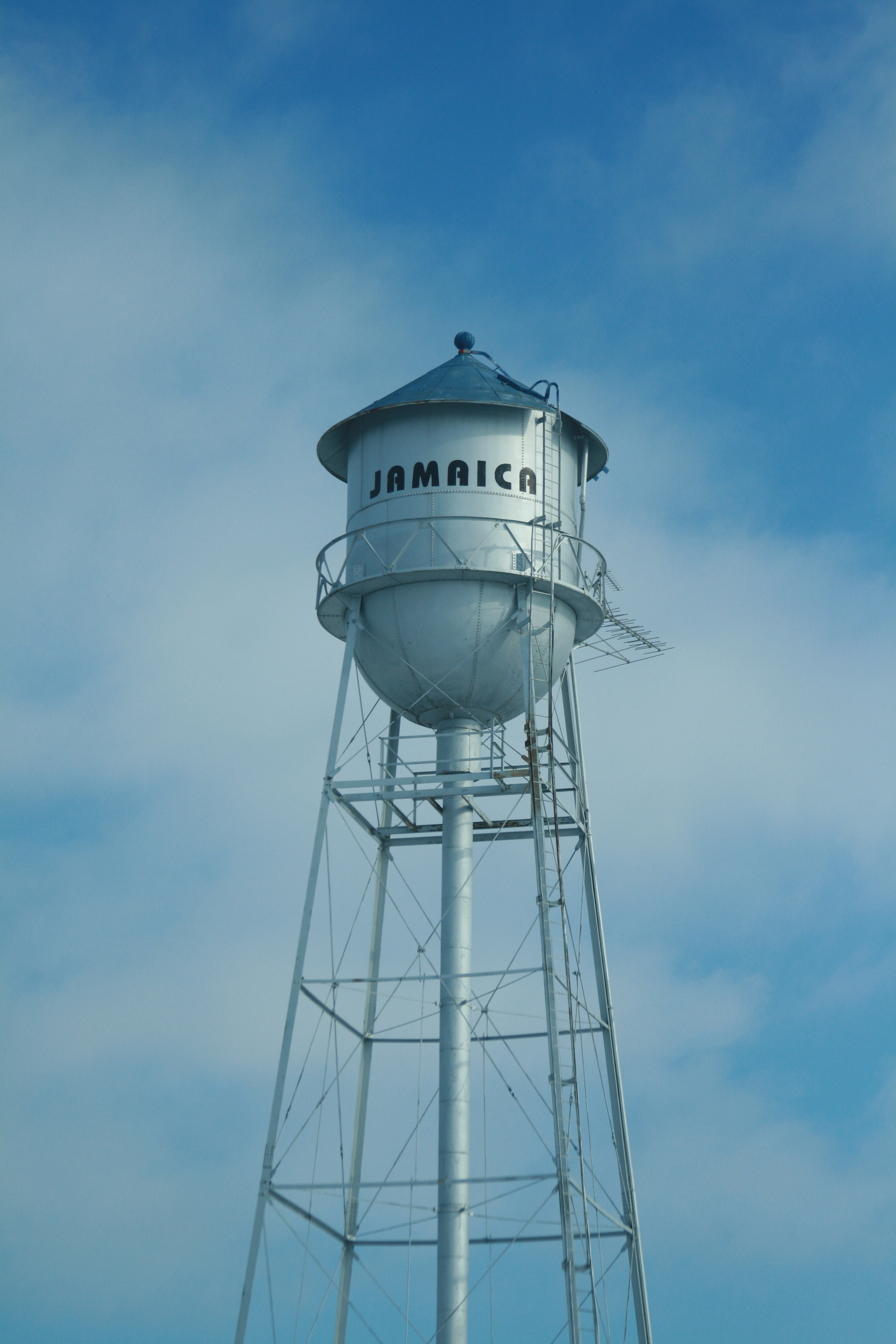
City water tower

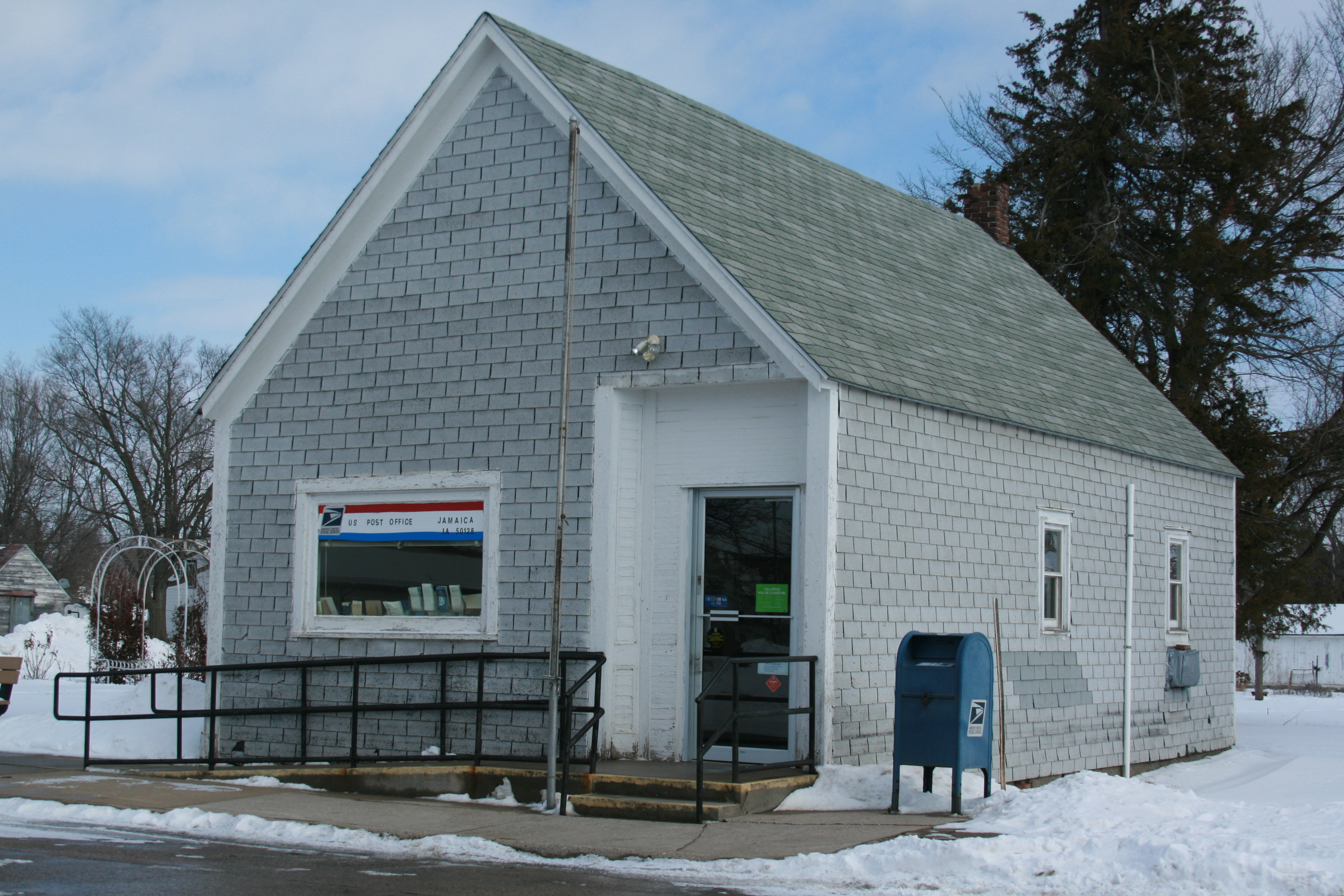
City post office

Historical populations
Year	Pop.	±%
1910	379	—
1920	295	−22.2%
1930	311	+5.4%
1940	283	−9.0%
1950	303	+7.1%
1960	256	−15.5%
1970	271	+5.9%
1980	275	+1.5%
1990	232	−15.6%
2000	237	+2.2%
2010	224	−5.5%
2020	195	−12.9%
Source:"U.S. Census website". United States Census Bureau. and Iowa Data Center; Source: U.S. Decennial Census

=== 2020 census ===
As of the census of 2020, there were 195 people, 83 households, and 42 families residing in the city. The population density was 523.7 inhabitants per square mile (202.2/km^{2}). There were 97 housing units at an average density of 260.5 per square mile (100.6/km^{2}). The racial makeup of the city was 86.2% White, 0.0% Black or African American, 0.0% Native American, 0.0% Asian, 0.0% Pacific Islander, 6.7% from other races and 7.2% from two or more races. Hispanic or Latino persons of any race comprised 15.9% of the population.

Of the 83 households, 24.1% of which had children under the age of 18 living with them, 34.9% were married couples living together, 4.8% were cohabitating couples, 30.1% had a female householder with no spouse or partner present and 30.1% had a male householder with no spouse or partner present. 49.4% of all households were non-families. 44.6% of all households were made up of individuals, 12.0% had someone living alone who was 65 years old or older.

The median age in the city was 43.8 years. 22.6% of the residents were under the age of 20; 5.6% were between the ages of 20 and 24; 22.6% were from 25 and 44; 30.8% were from 45 and 64; and 18.5% were 65 years of age or older. The gender makeup of the city was 52.8% male and 47.2% female.

=== 2010 census ===
As of the census of 2010, there were 224 people, 97 households, and 57 families residing in the city. The population density was 487.0 inhabitants per square mile (188.0/km^{2}). There were 109 housing units at an average density of 237.0 units per square mile (91.5 units/km^{2}). The racial makeup of the city was 95.1% White, 2.7% from other races, and 2.2% from two or more races. Hispanic or Latino of any race were 6.3% of the population.

There were 97 households, of which 27.8% had children under the age of 18 living with them, 41.2% were married couples living together, 11.3% had a female householder with no husband present, 6.2% had a male householder with no wife present, and 41.2% were non-families. 37.1% of all households were made up of individuals, and 18.6% had someone living alone who was 65 years of age or older. The average household size was 2.31 and the average family size was 3.11.

The median age in the city was 41.7 years. 24.6% of residents were under the age of 18; 6.6% were between the ages of 18 and 24; 22.8% were from 25 to 44; 28.5% were from 45 to 64; and 17.4% were 65 years of age or older. The gender makeup of the city was 47.8% male and 52.2% female.

=== 2000 census ===
As of the census of 2000, there were 237 people, 102 households, and 57 families residing in the city. The population density was 518.1 inhabitants per square mile (200.0/km^{2}). There were 114 housing units at an average density of 249.2 units per square mile (96.2 units/km^{2}). The racial makeup of the city was 98.73% White, 1.27% from other races. Hispanic or Latino of any race were 1.27% of the population.

There were 102 households, out of which 24.5% had children under the age of 18 living with them, 48.0% were married couples living together, 4.9% had a female householder with no husband present, and 44.1% were non-families. 36.3% of all households were made up of individuals, and 17.6% had someone living alone who was 65 years of age or older. The average household size was 2.32 and the average family size was 3.16.

In the city, the population was spread out, with 24.5% under the age of 18, 7.6% from 18 to 24, 30.0% from 25 to 44, 21.1% from 45 to 64, and 16.9% who were 65 years of age or older. The median age was 38 years. For every 100 females, there were 88.1 males. For every 100 females age 18 and over, there were 86.5 males.

The median income for a household in the city was $35,417, and the median income for a family was $41,875. Males had a median income of $27,917 versus $18,750 for females. The per capita income for the city was $18,850. About 8.8% of families and 14.5% of the population were below the poverty line, including 31.9% of those under the age of eighteen and 5.3% of those 65 or over.

== Economy ==
A 6,000-square-foot (560 m^{2}) recording studio, Sound Farm, where Slipknot & The Envy Corps recorded their 2008 albums All Hope is Gone and Dwell, is located in Jamaica.

== Education ==
Panorama Community School District serves the community. The district formed on July 1, 1989, as a merger of the Panora-Linden and Y-J-B school districts.

== Arts and culture ==
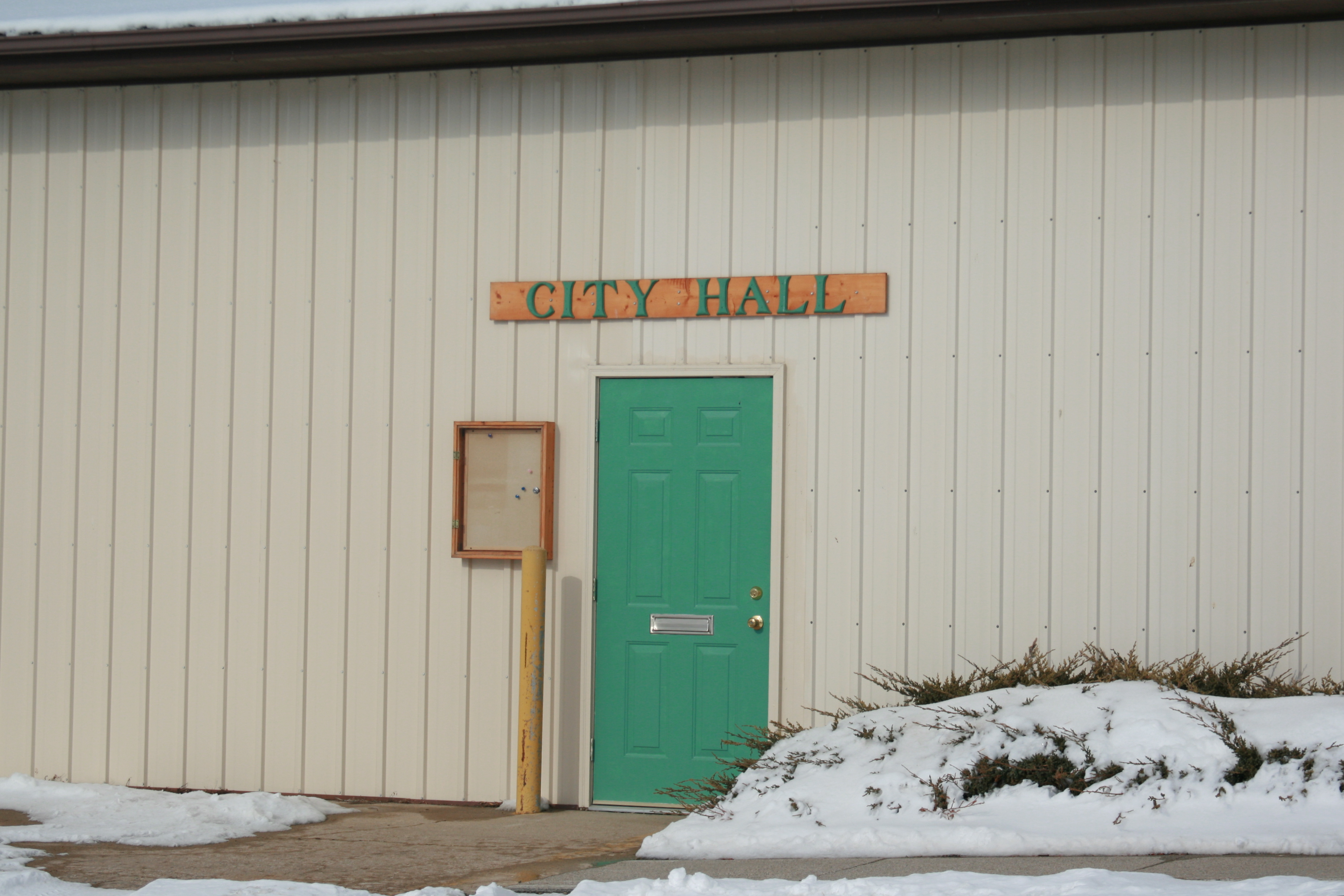
Jamaica City Hall

Near to Jamaica is an octagon barn built in 1881, one of seven in Iowa to be listed on the National Register of Historic Places. The metal band Slipknot filmed the music video for "Psychosocial" here.

== Government ==
LaDonna Kennedy was elected mayor in 2015 but resigned in January 2019 after being arrested on charges related to marijuana found growing in her basement.

== See also ==
- Raccoon River Valley Trail
