= Sound Farm Studio & Recording Environment =

Recording studio in Iowa, United States

Sound Farm Studio & Recording Environment was a 6,000-square-foot (560 m^{2}) full-service recording studio and production facility with an attached residence located in Jamaica, Iowa, built in 2003. Matthew Sepanic, owner, producer and engineer; worked on projects by Slipknot (All Hope is Gone), Iowa (engineered), Murderdolls, and Stone Sour (House of Gold and Bones) amongst others. He also co-produced and engineered The Envy Corps's debut album Dwell which was released in 2008 on Mercury Records/Vertigo Records. The band recorded and resided at Sound Farm in late 2006 and early 2007.

In the first half of 2008, the heavy metal band Slipknot spent four months recording their fourth album, All Hope Is Gone, at Sound Farm. The album was largely produced and engineered by Dave Fortman (Evanescence, Mudvayne), but Sepanic was at the helm for a few tracks. The band also filmed the video for their second single off the album, "Psychosocial", at Sound Farm.

In July 2008 Japanese metal veterans Outrage recorded a cover version of the Metallica classic "Fight Fire with Fire" for METAL-IKKA, a Japanese Metallica tribute album at Sound Farm.

The facility closed in 2013. The residential portion of the facility is currently listed at AirBnB. Sepanic is currently an instructor at Dark Horse Institute in Franklin, Tennessee, and engineer, producer and manager at Sonic Factory Recording Studio in Des Moines, Iowa.
