= Steampunk fashion =

Subgenre of the steampunk movement

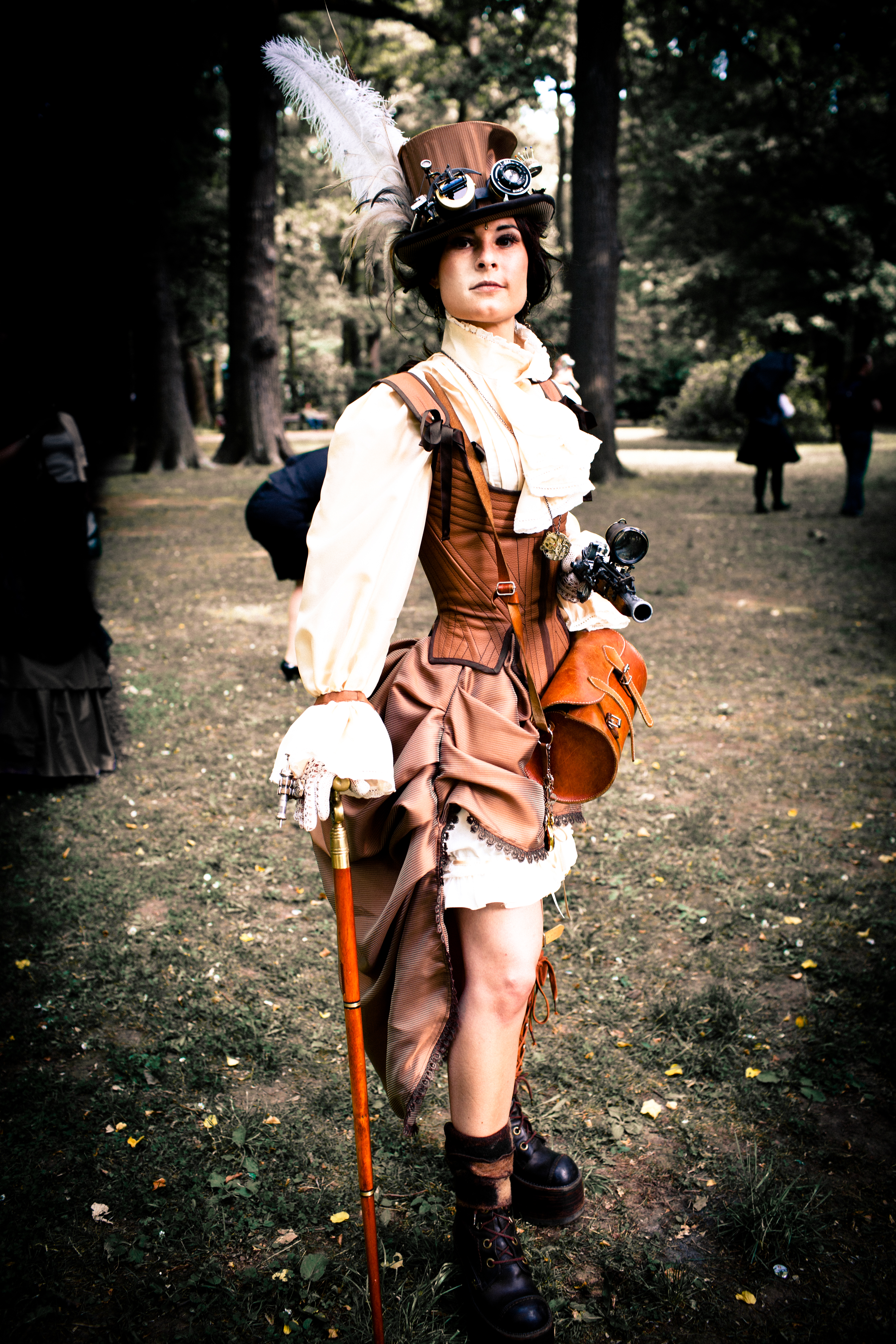
Example of steampunk fashion

Steampunk fashion is a subgenre of the steampunk movement in science fiction. It is a mixture of the Victorian era's romantic view of science in literature and elements from the Industrial Revolution in Europe during the 1800s. Steampunk fashion consists of clothing, hairstyling, jewellery, body modification and make-up. More modern ideals of steampunk can include t-shirts with a variety of designs or the humble jeans being accessorised with belts and gun holsters.

== History ==
Steampunk fashion is a subgenre of the steampunk movement in science fiction. It is a mixture of the Victorian era's romantic view of science in literature and the industrialisation in most parts of Europe. The aesthetics of the fashion are designed with a post-apocalyptic era in mind. At the first steampunk convention, "SalonCon", in 2006, steampunk enthusiasts dressed up in costumes reflecting that era. The costumes included clothing, hairstyling, jewellery, body modification and make-up. Steampunk fashion has later gone on to include gadgets and contrasting accoutrements.

Initially, the clothes such as bustiers, bodices, jackets and other items were mostly handmade and customized, but as the steampunk movement grew, entrepreneurs and companies became interested and started to mass-produce steampunk clothing to be sold both online and in stores.

Since the genre emerged, the aesthetic of steampunk fashion has remained constant. New ideas in literature, and advancements in science and technology have resulted in subtle changes. Even though the genre did not become widely known until the late 20th century, steampunk and its fashion is said to have existed earlier.

During the 1980s and 1990s, steampunk fashion grew along with the goth and punk movements in fashion. Cyberpunk and dieselpunk fashion are variants of the steampunk fashion of the 1980s.

== Inspiration from literature ==
Works of writers from the end of the 19th century, such as those of Robert Louis Stevenson, G. K. Chesterton and Sir Arthur Conan Doyle are among the most influential for steampunk fashion. Those works attempted to domesticate Charles Dickens's London (from his industrial age novels). Sci-fi critics John Clute and Peter Nicholls have noted that steampunk is also inspired by a "strain of nostalgia". However, modern steampunk literature, which began only in the 1980s, has also influenced the steampunk fashion during the 2010s. Steampunk writers from that period are credited with creating fantasy tales set in cultures with style borrowed from the Victorian, with stories that includes giddy action scenes and elaborate baroque expeditions.

Kevin Jeter's 1979 novel Morlock Night is held to be the first steampunk novel, and the beginning of steampunk fashion.

== Aesthetic ==
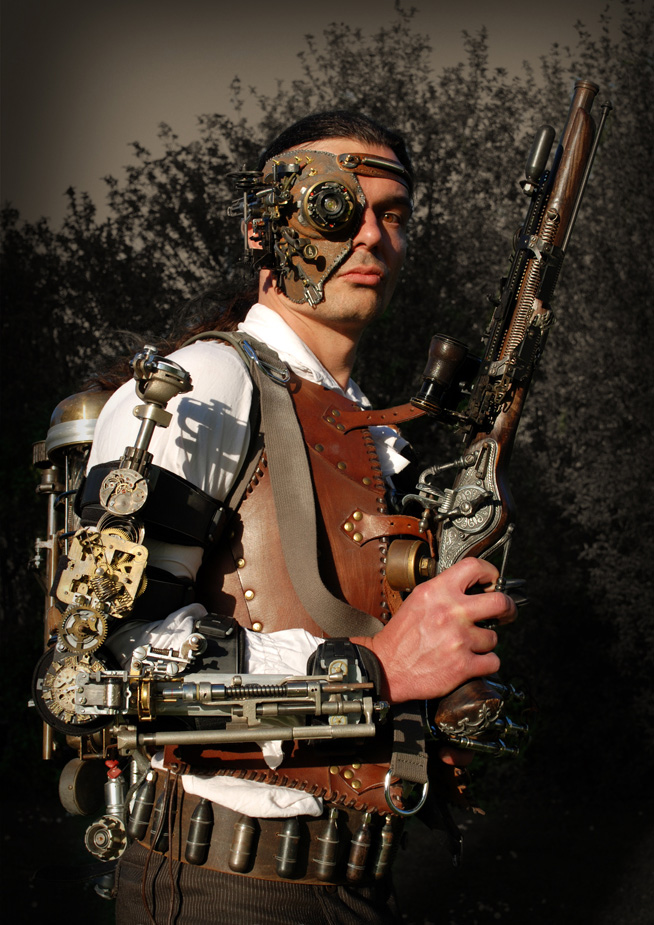
Steampunk outfit with leather vest, heavy gun, vambrace, backpack time machine, mask, and Victorian clothes

Just like its counterparts in other art forms, primarily literature, steampunk fashion is based on the aesthetic of an alternate history. Even though critics disagree about it being rooted in fantasy literature, there are elements that suggests that some part of its aesthetic is conceived from books and films that showcase alternate history using fantasy. Interest in steampunk aesthetics may also be due to an increased interest from the fashion industry in Victorian spiritualism, during the 2010s.

Within the steampunk fashion, there are a number of personas, or archetypes, such as the valiant explorer with pith helmet, brass telescope and binoculars; the debonair aviator with birdlike gadgets and devices, leather helmet, brass goggles and canvas coat; and the gentleman, with a lab coat over formal clothes and belts for all sorts of implements and instruments.

== Styles ==
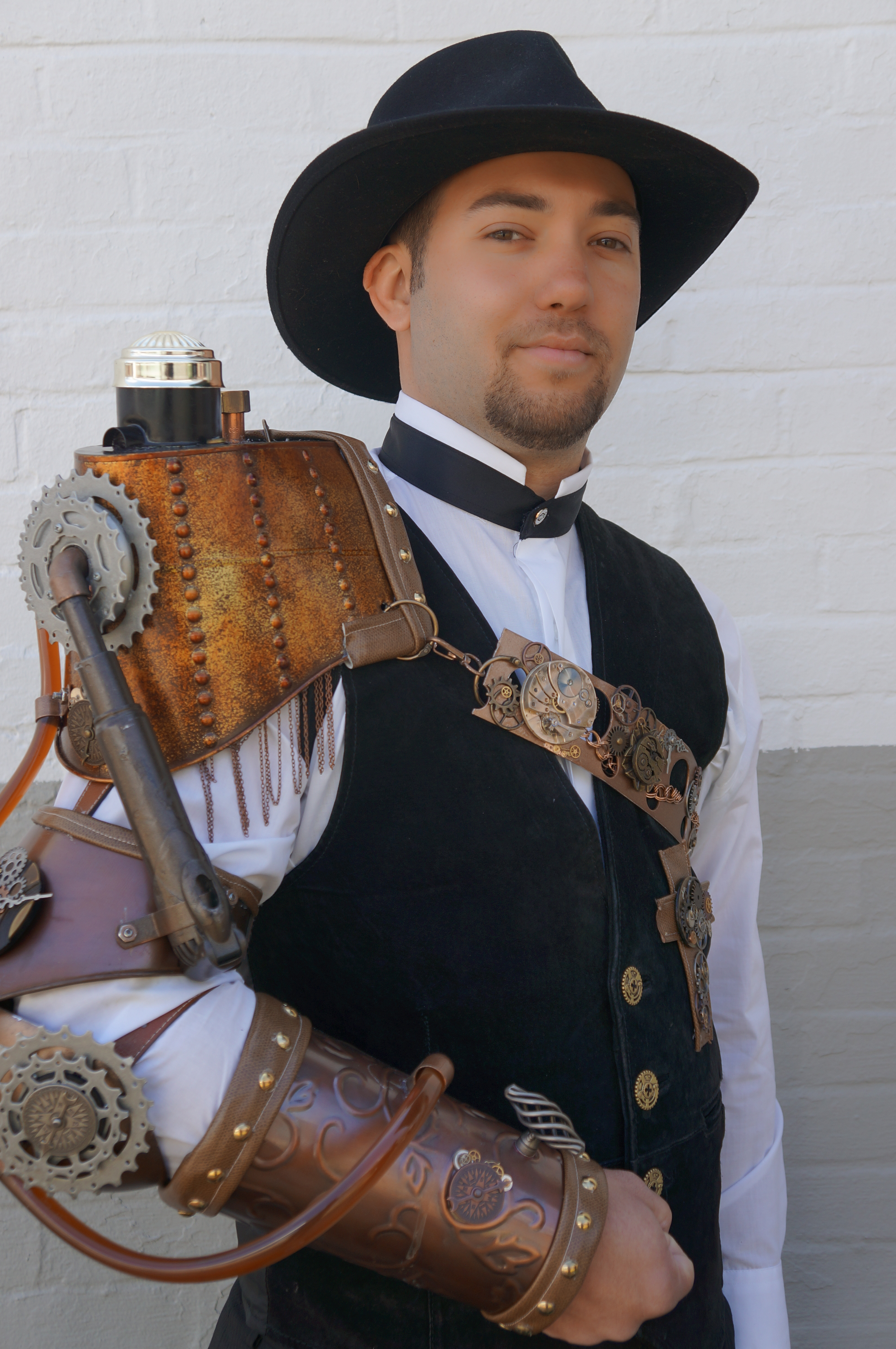
Brass accessories

Steampunk fashion is a mixture of fashion trends from different historical periods. Steampunk clothing adds the looks of characters from the 19th century, explorers, soldiers, lords, countesses and harlots, to the punk, contemporary street fashion, burlesque, goth, fetishism, vampire and frills among others. Related to steampunk fashion is the Lolita fashion, which strand stands for a youthful expression of girlishness. Though they both take inspiration from the Victorian era, Lolita is more modest and focused on purchasing clothing from commercial vendors, as opposed to steampunk clothing, which is traditionally created from things bought in thrift stores.

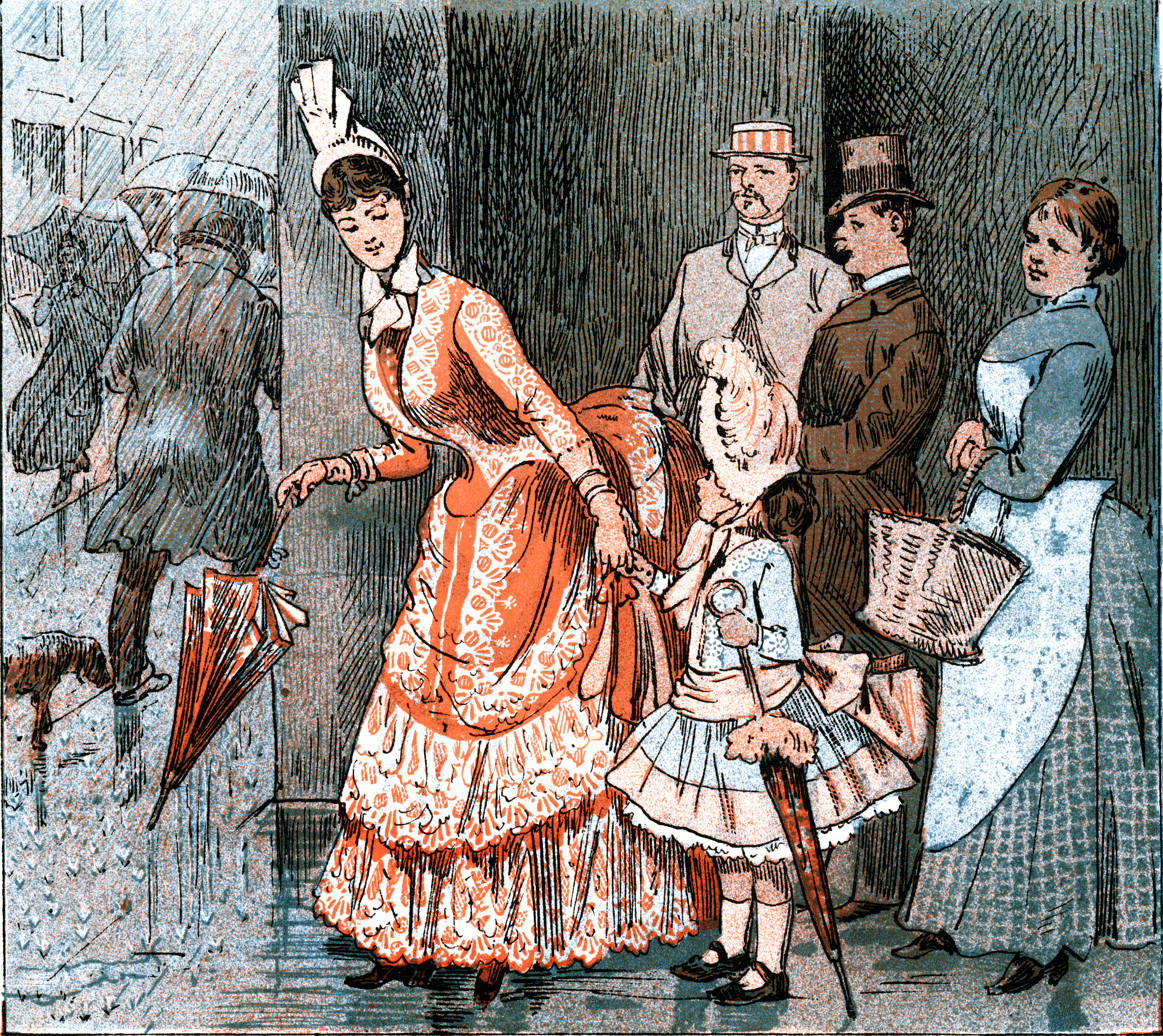
Fashion in 1887

The base of steampunk fashion is primarily influenced by the fashion of the mid-19th century. For women this fashion was often dominated by long, flowing dresses and regal jacket bodices. The latter extended over the hips and matched the skirt fabric only occasionally. In the beginning of the 1860s, the bodice ended at the waist. New styles emerged and the Garibaldi blouse, made its appearance. During the early 1860s, the hoops of the skirts were also taking on an elliptical shape, with a much fuller back and a narrower front silhouette. The ensuing conical shaped skirts have also inspired the steampunk fashion. At the beginning of the 20th century, skirts that were flared at the hem became popular. Dresses for women were sometimes masculine tailored and made to look intimidating. Evening wear for women were decorated with sparkling beads, bangles and gaudy embroideries. The hobble skirt was also introduced at that time.

Steampunk fashion did originally not include much jewelry, but a few accoutrements have made their way into the style during the 2010s.

In steampunk fashion, corsets are more of a clothing item than an undergarment. Being rather conspicuous, they have more or less become synonymous with the genre. Corsets in brocade or leather, with steel-boning are a form of steampunk clothing inspired by the Victorian era.

Brass goggles have become a trademark for steampunk fashion. Brass items are also a kind of official, standard steampunk accessory. Goggles with intricate patterns on large, round frames are the most commonly used ones. Hats in steampunk fashion may include all kinds of headgear like flight helmets, bowler hats, pith helmets and pirates' bandanas. The headgear in steampunk fashion is also inspired by Victorian era fashion styles.

Many of the skirt and dress styles worn in Steampunk fashion are derivative of Victorian era silhouettes (bell skirts, trumpet skirts, bustled skirts, etc.), but with a sexier, modern twist.

== In popular culture ==
In 2005, Kate Lambert, known professionally as "Kato", founded the first steampunk clothing company, "Steampunk Couture", mixing Victorian, post-apocalyptic and tribal influences as well as sci-fi, shabby chic and Harajuku/Mori girl elements. As early as 2010, high fashion lines such as Prada, Dolce & Gabbana, Versace, Chanel and Christian Dior began introducing steampunk and neo-Victorian-inspired styles on the fashion runways. And in episode 7 of Lifetime's "Project Runway: Under the Gunn" reality series, contestants were challenged to create avant-garde "steampunk chic" looks. Steampunk masks made by Ukrainian design studio Bob Basset, named by William Gibson as "Probably the single best steampunk object I've seen", using by music band members: Sid Wilson from Slipknot and Zac Baird from Korn.

Since the early 2000s, steampunk fashion has been used frequently in films, photography and on television. Guy Ritchie's Sherlock Holmes and Warehouse 13 are examples of this. Films like The Golden Compass, Van Helsing, 'Sweeney Todd: The Demon Barber of Fleet Street (2007 film)' and The Three Musketeers also include elements of steampunk ideas and steampunk fashion. Steampunk fashion has also been showing up in music, such as in Lindsay Stirling's music video "Roundtable Rival". Members of the alternative band Abney Park perform in steampunk attire.

The crime show Castle had a steampunk-themed episode in which the title character is shown wearing a complete steampunk outfit after meeting with a steampunk society.

America's Next Top Model tackled Steampunk fashion in a 2012 episode where models competed in a Steampunk themed photo shoot, posing in front of a steam train while holding a live owl.

Becky Lynch, a wrestler currently employed by WWE, uses ring attire influenced by steampunk fashion. Most notable being her goggles she wears in her entrance.

== Trends ==
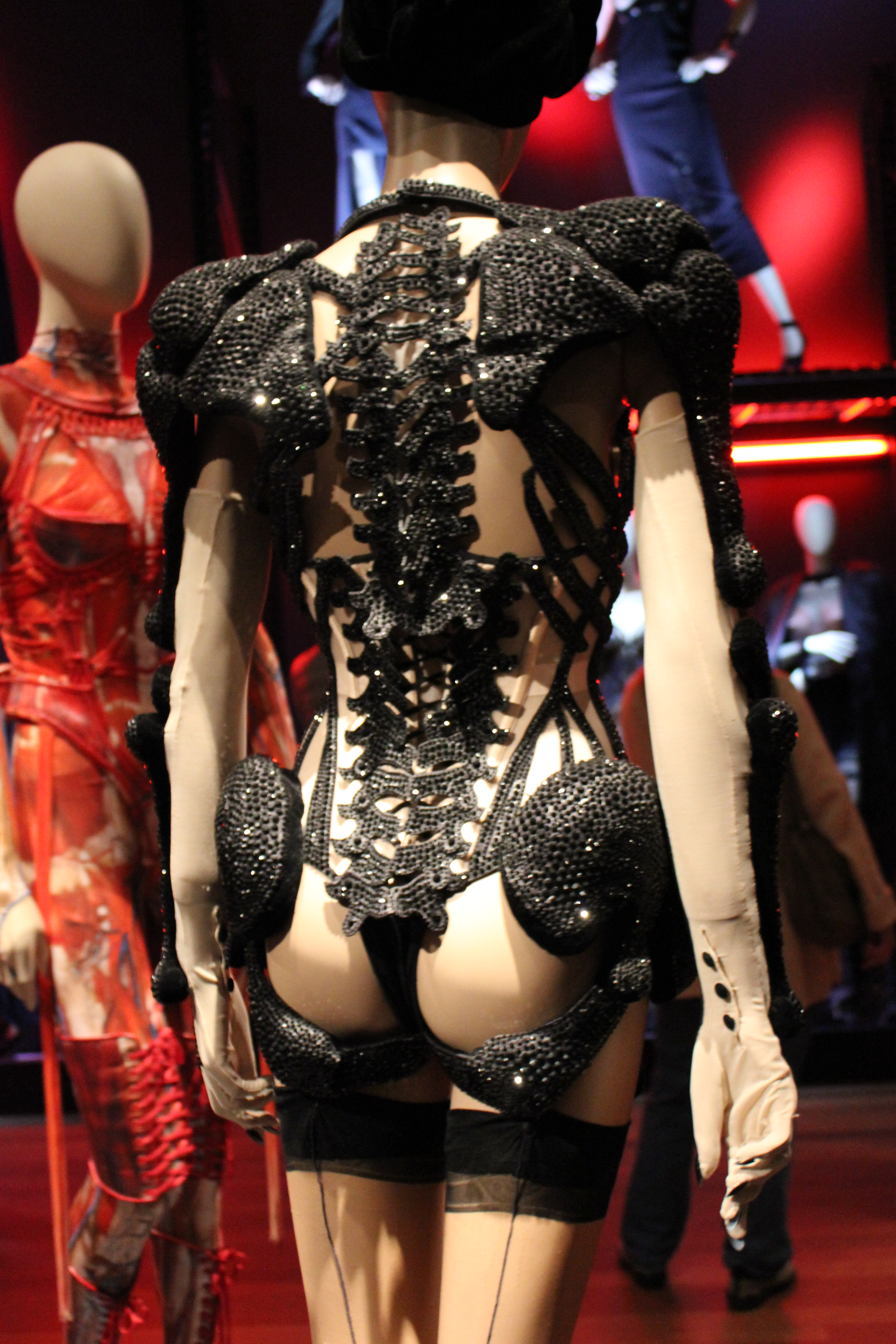
Corset by Jean Paul Gaultier

Steampunk fashion has evolved into a culture of imaginative dressing, inspired by the aesthetics of the past. Modern-day fashion critics have actively sought to deconstruct steampunk as a term and as a philosophy in the context of fashion. Modern trends in steampunk fashion are grouped into historical recreationists and sci-fi cosplayers. Since the first steampunk convention in 2006, SalonCon, there have been a number of similar conventions where enthusiasts dress up as characters from steampunk culture. Modern steampunk clothing is based more on leather and metal as opposed to cotton or natural fabrics. More recently, steampunk has also been linked to fetishism, the genderqueer community and modern paganism.

In 2010, steampunk fashion entered the high-end market of fashion as designer John Galliano brought elements from the style to his spring haute couture show for Christian Dior. Another designer associated with the steampunk style is Jean Paul Gaultier, who frequently shows corsets in different material in his collections. As of 2015, steampunk fashion started to influence the more mainstream fashion trends.

== See also ==
- Victorian decorative arts
- Victorian fashion
- Neo-Victorian
