= Iron Custom Motors =

Ukrainian custom motorcycle workshop

Iron Custom Motors (ICM), formerly Iron Custom Motorcycles until February 2018, is a Ukrainian custom motorcycle workshop founded in Kharkiv in 2010 by Yaroslav Lutytskyi. The company became the first Ukrainian workshop to represent the country at world and European custom bike building championships. The official name change to Iron Custom Motors was announced in February 2018.

In 2025, the company announced the opening of a representative office in Lisbon, Portugal. On 2 May 2026, Iron Custom Motors opened a motorcycle workshop in Cascais, Portugal, continuing its activity as an international custom motorcycle workshop and motorcycle service company.

== Awards on the championships ==
Year	Championship	Class	Award	Project
2012	Tricky Air Championship	-	4th place	"The First"
2013	AMD World Championship of Custom Bike Building	Modified Harley-Davidson class	13th place	"Fetish"
2014	Italian Motorcycle Championship	Freestyle Class	3rd place	"Sturmvogel"
2014	AMD World Championship of Custom Bike Building	-	4th place	"Sturmvogel"
2015	Crazy Harley Party 2015	Street Performance Class	Best custom!	"Sturmvogel"
2016	AMD World Championship of Custom Bike Building	Cafe Racer Class	1st place	"Beckman"
2017	Bonneville Speed Week	350APS-VG	World speed record: 99,764 mph	"Inspirium"
2018	AMD World Championship of Custom Bike Building	Retro/Modified Class	4th place	"Geometric"
2019	Private client project	-	Completed project	"Joker"
2020	Private client project	-	Completed project	"Quanta R"
2023	BMW Motorrad Customizing Championship	BMW R18 Class	Winner	"Unbreakable"
2024	BMW Motorrad collaboration	BMW R18 Dragster	Completed project	"Burly"

== Projects ==
=== The first ===
The company's first project, which participated in the international championship. Donor bike for the project was the HD Night Rod Special, released in 2009. Custom designed in the style of HD and is fully compliant with HD-standards. Engineering calculations were borrowed from Porsche, engine – company Rotax. Body kit and motorcycle wheels — V-Rod - No-Limit-Custom. Tire casings from Avon Venom. The fuel controller and exhaust pipe – Vance&Hines. The model is equipped with full pneumatic suspension and front fork with traverses from Tricky Air. The computerized system allows to change the suspension height, stiffness and pumping order.

=== Fetish ===
Donor for the future custom became Harley Davidson HD Rocker C of 2008. The project is equipped with a hydraulic clutch linkage and suspension B-17 PD “Black Widow”. In addition, ICM craftsmen installed unilateral idler arm War Eagle and progressive suspension Air Tail.

=== Sturmvogel ===
The custom was based on the idea of “Dieselpunk” style model, rocket shaped and with maximal functionalism. Harley-Davidson XR 1200 of 2009 model year was the basis. The model is equipped with sports slick tires RSD, braking systems and machines from PM, running boards and damper from LSL. The rear suspension was designed on the basis of racing technology — with a single shock absorber under the engine. Creators made the custom's back lighter by shifting down the center of gravity. Oil tank is moved under the engine and control unit — to the tail of the model. Under the lower cowling radiator and other parts are located. Titanium exhaust system of the company Zard is installed.

“Dry” system of nitrous oxide, which increases the power of the bike by 20 horsepower to the already existing 80 is added. Semi-automatic clutch EFI adapted specifically for the custom.

Body kit is made of fiberglass popular in the 50s, 60s — a design decision within the framework of the selected futuristic style. The style is supplemented with a custom body kit in the form of the monocoque without visible mounting points.

Bob Basset, internationally known for his masks, created a custom helmet-mask for the Sturmvögel project, and later designed masks for Inspirium and Quanta R.

=== Beckman ===
The basis for the idea of this model customizing has served the domestic motorcycle. By all parameters the project was created as a Café Racer of the late 1970s - early 1980s. For this reason, in creation of this model only domestic parts of 1960-1980s were used, the remaining components were created by ICM craftsmen by hand, but with preservation of the technologies of the above-mentioned period.

The project name was chosen in honor of William Beckman – Soviet design engineer, professor, sportsman and instructor of motorcycle sport. Wilhelm Beckmann – the author of many books on motorsport and motorcycle design, based on which the custom was built, fully modified by engineering and design technologies of the time.

Custom was created from a donor IZH Jupiter-4 1982. After complete modification of the model, the original parts in the motorcycle are almost gone.

== World speed record of the motorcycle Inspirium ==
On the 13 of August 2017, the ICM team set a world speed record on a specially created motorcycle Inspirium class 350APS-VG.

This class includes specially built vintage motorcycles with a fairing, an engine volume of up to 350 cm^{3}, manufactured before 1955, working on gasoline and deprived of modern electronic devices (injectors, computers, etc.).

The world record was set on Lake Bonneville, as part of the Bonnewille Speed Week 2017.

The ICM team set a world speed record on the Inspirium 350APS-VG motorcycle on the 13 of August 2017 at 07:53, its record speed is 99,764 mph.

The speed of the motorcycle during the first lap was 99,197 miles per hour, the speed during the second lap was 100,331 miles per hour, the maximum average speed during the race was 104,106 miles per hour.

=== Previous record ===
The previous record in this class was set in 2013 by the French team Ecole De La Performance on the motorcycle AMC and equals 86,818 miles per hour.

=== Inspirium specifications ===
Year of manufacture	2015–2017
Base	Motorcycle IZH-49 (ИЖ-49), year of manufacture – 1953
Engine volume	350 cm^{3}
Frame	ICM
Kit	ICM
Power	36 horse power
