= Bob Basset =

Ukrainian artist (born 1976)

Serhii Petrov
- Сергій Петров
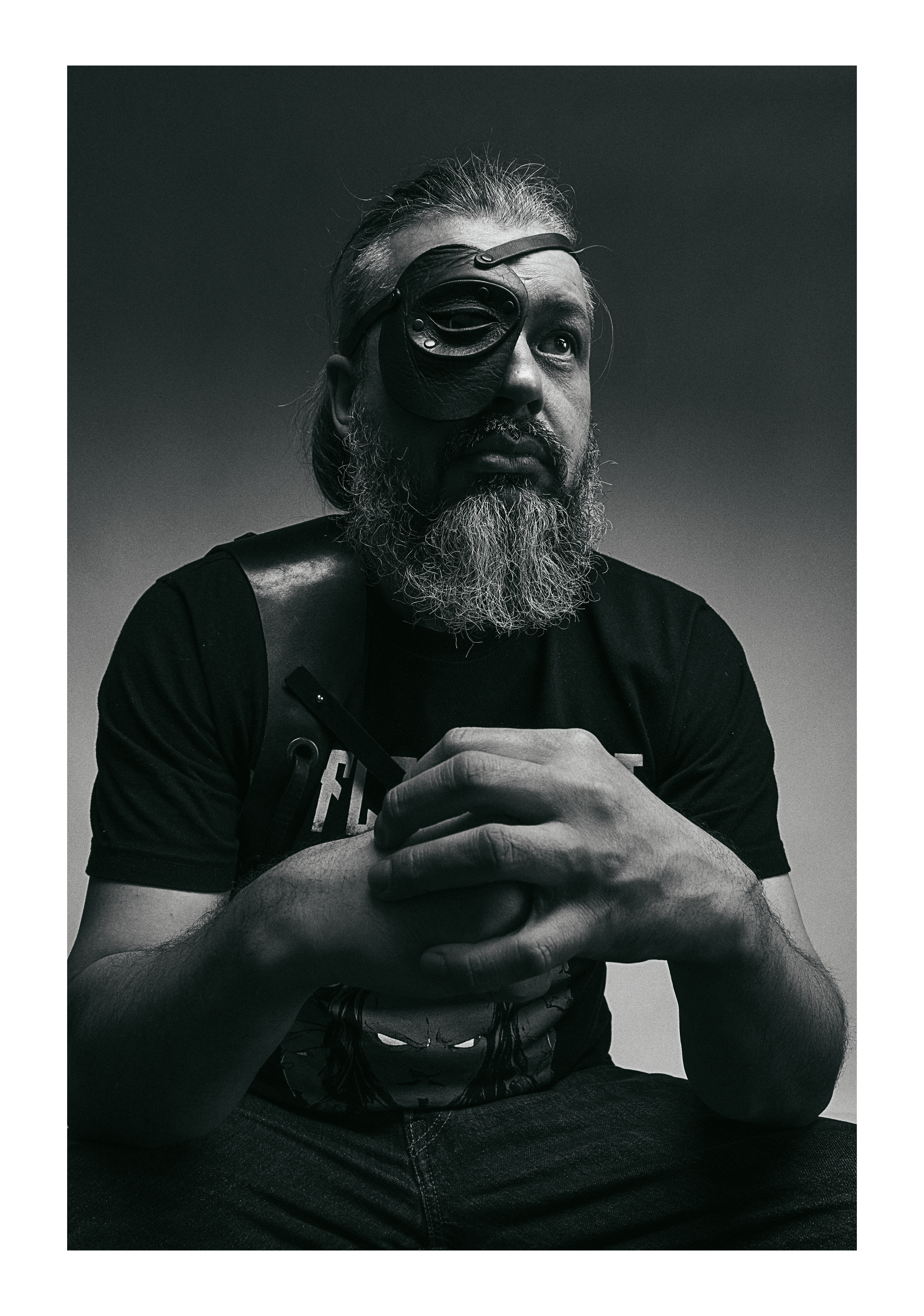
- Serhii Petrov, co-founder and artist of Bob Basset
- Born: 1976 (age 49–50); Kharkiv, Ukraine
- Years active: 1989 – present
- Known for: Serhii Petrov is a Ukrainian artist who works on an international level under the pseudonym Bob Basset, and opened a studio under the same name. He works with leather and a number of other materials, creating masks and accessories for fashion brands, photo and video shoots, music videos, movies and other purposes.
- Relatives: Oleg Petrov (brother)
- Website: bobbasset.com

Signature
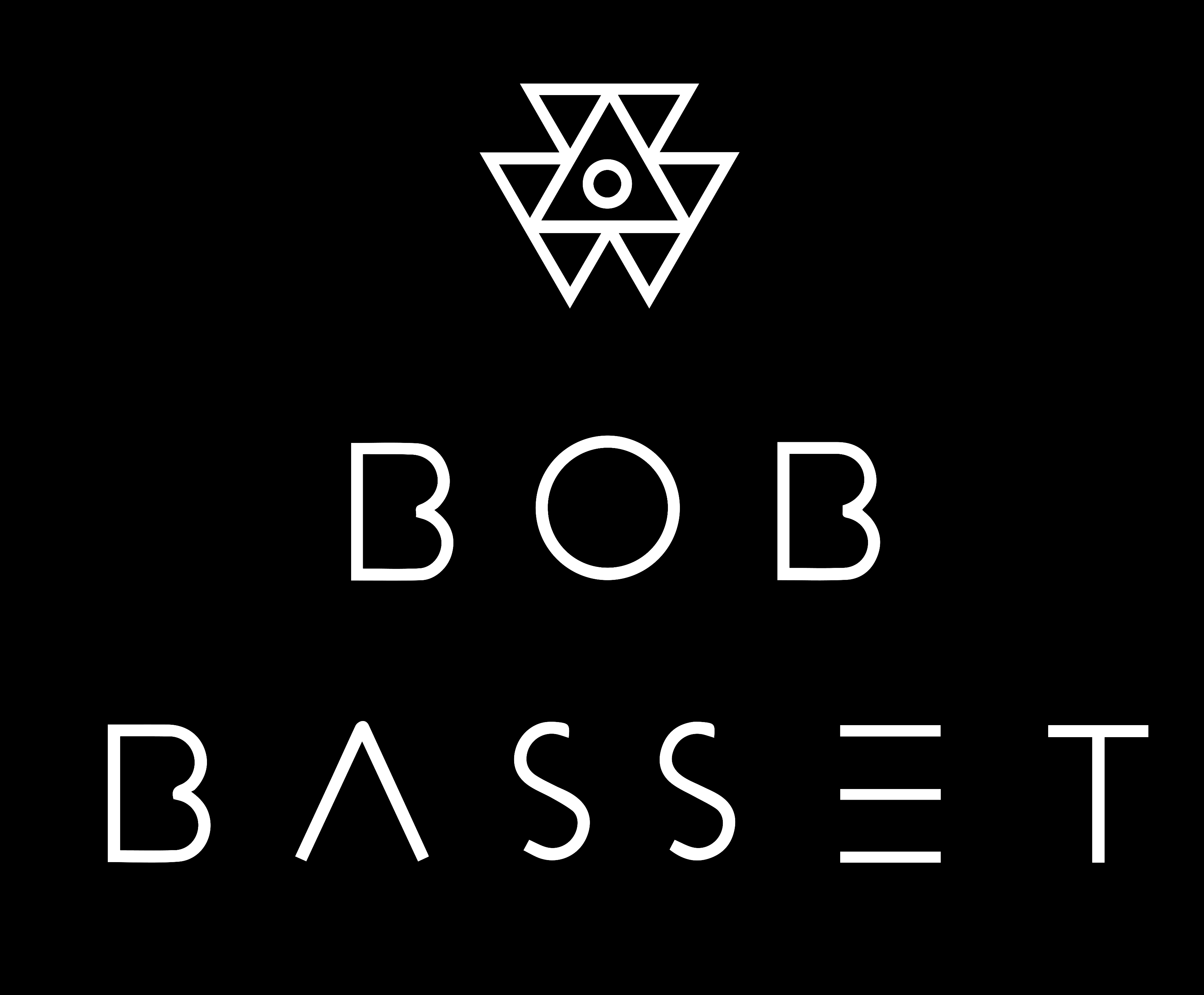

Serhii Petrov (Ukrainian: Сергій Петров; born 1976, Kharkiv, Ukraine), known professionally as Bob Basset, is a Ukrainian artist and co-founder of an art studio under the same name.

The studio creates wearable art pieces such as masks, bags, clutches, bracelets, cases, and more in the techno-romanticism genre. Artist works primarily with leather, metal, stone, wood, bone, ceramic, and glass. Over the years, leather masks have become his main object of artistic practice, and they have been used in a variety of arenas. Bob Basset items have been exhibited all over the world, often as main attributes at Fashion Week shows and at exhibitions and projects, including the International Museum Day. Collectors from different countries often buy Bob Basset masks for their private collections.

The studio was co-founded in 1989 by Serhii Petrov and his brother, Oleg, in Kharkiv, Ukraine. After Oleg's death in 2011, Serhii Petrov became the face, main artist, and manager of the brand.

In 2016, Bob Basset was included in a list of nine revolutionary Ukrainian designers. The studio's items were highly appraised by the founder of the steampunk style, William Gibson, filmmaker and artist David Lynch, and post-cyberpunk and science fiction author Cory Doctorow. Bob Basset created masks and other items for the Givenchy brand and stylists Panos Yiapanis and Riccardo Tisci. The studio also worked with the Ukrainian brands sasha.kanevski and L'UVE (partnering with the designer Valeria Kovalska). A mask from the Bob Basset collection "Mashrabiya" was used in Hollywood actress Elizabeth Banks' photo shoot. A number of Bob Basset masks were created for a movie produced by Ridley Scott Associates (RSA Films) and Michael Bay, for the movie Metallica: Through the Never, and were used to promote the American TV show The Last Ship. Bob Basset masks were used in a number of music videos for bands and artists. From 2013, Bob Basset creates masks for Sid Wilson from the music band Slipknot; the studio also worked with Metallica, Korn, Avril Lavigne, Otep, Tantric, Zayn, British DJ Jungleboi, Dutch DJ R3hab, Beissoul & Einius, Ghost. Bob Basset created gaming design pieces for the international company Plarium, and a mask for the Iron Custom Motorcycles speed record project.

Bob Basset have appeared in the media Vogue International (USA), The New York Times (USA), The New York Times Fashion Magazine (USA), Flaunt (USA), WAD (France), Vice U.K. (UK), Bizarre (UK), INSIDE Artzine (Germany), Trendson magazine (Hong-Kong), Dazed (UK), METCHA, Wired Italia (Italy), and others.

Bob Basset also created personal collections: "Mashrabiya" (2014), "Survivors" (2015), "Calvary" (or "Golgotha") (2016), "Turnskin" (2019) and MUTABOR (2026).

== Art ==
=== Style, working process and materials ===
==== Techno-romanticism ====
From the start, Bob Basset creations were seen as steampunk in style, and later he was referred to as a "steampunk guru." However, the Petrov brothers considered themselves the founders of their own style: "techno-romanticism."

Over the years, Bob Basset became known as "techno-romanticism pioneer." Serhii Petrov often describes his studio pieces as "real objects from unreal worlds."

Techno-romanticism doesn't have straightforward rules, so the artist is free to mix different styles, items, and materials. The style involves idealization of the technology and mechanics and romanticization of the creative process and its result.

==== Working process and team growth ====
Petrov considers everything around him an inspiration for his work, from human emotions to objects and nature. He is passionate about experimenting with technology and seeking new skills. He doesn't draw primary sketches, but starts to make an object at once after working with the material and understanding its qualities, because of his belief that "a tool has a great influence on the result."

The manufacture of one mask can take from ten hours to a year. To create a mask not only esthetically pleasing but also comfortable to wear, Petrov thinks through the ventilation system and sometimes arranges trials to see how long a person can wear it easily.

The studio has a team of four to six assistant designers, but the number of people involved on a certain project depends on the task. In general, Serhii doesn't let outsiders visit his workshop.

Arina Petrova later joined the studio's work. She began with basic production processes and gradually moved on to independent work with design, leather and form. Petrova is currently a designer and creative director at Bob Basset.

==== Materials ====
Bob Basset's primary material is leather. He also uses metal, stone, wood, bone, ceramic, and glass. The artist's main criteria for leather is that it has an "ethical origin" and is "a product of animal husbandry," not only because all the workshop processes depend on the quality of material, but to show his respect towards the material. The studio uses leather from many countries, including from Ukraine, Belarus, Italy, and Africa.

Samples of Bob Basset masks

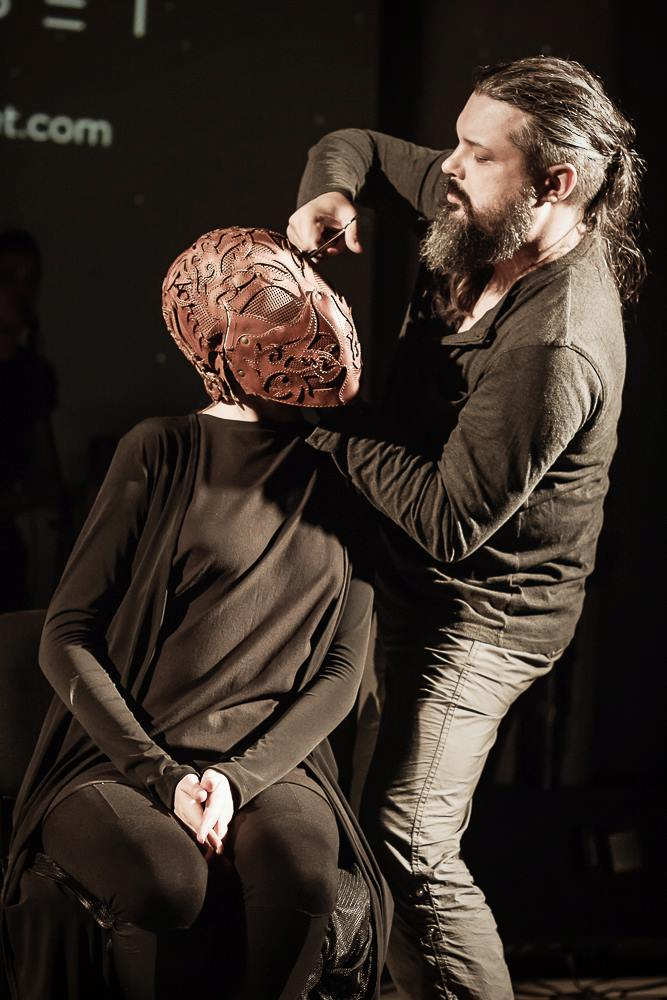
Bob Basset presenting his mask at the art-performance "Behind the Mask", Gogolfest, 2015

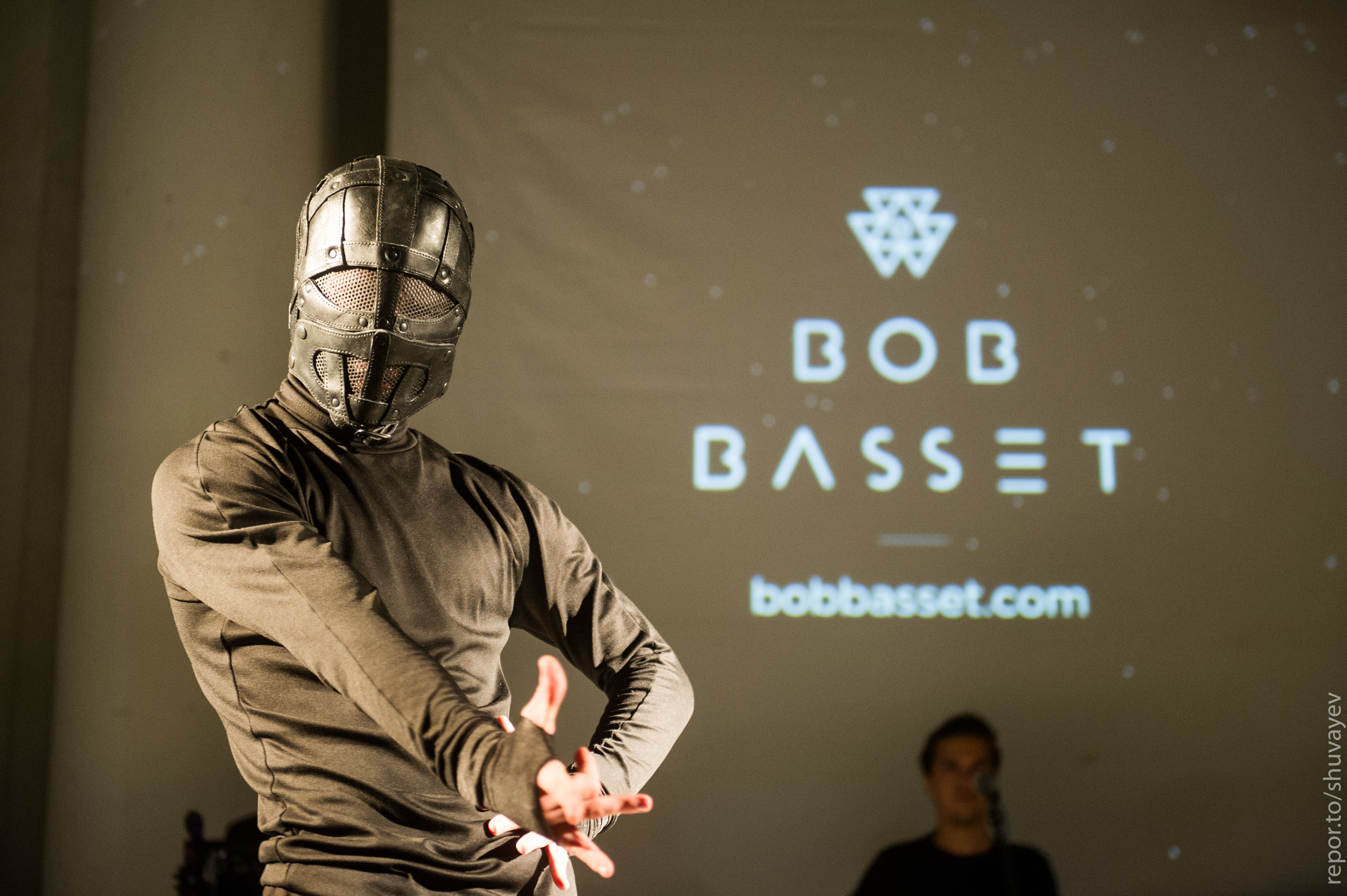
Bob Basset leather mask at the art-performance "Behind the Mask", Gogolfest, 2015

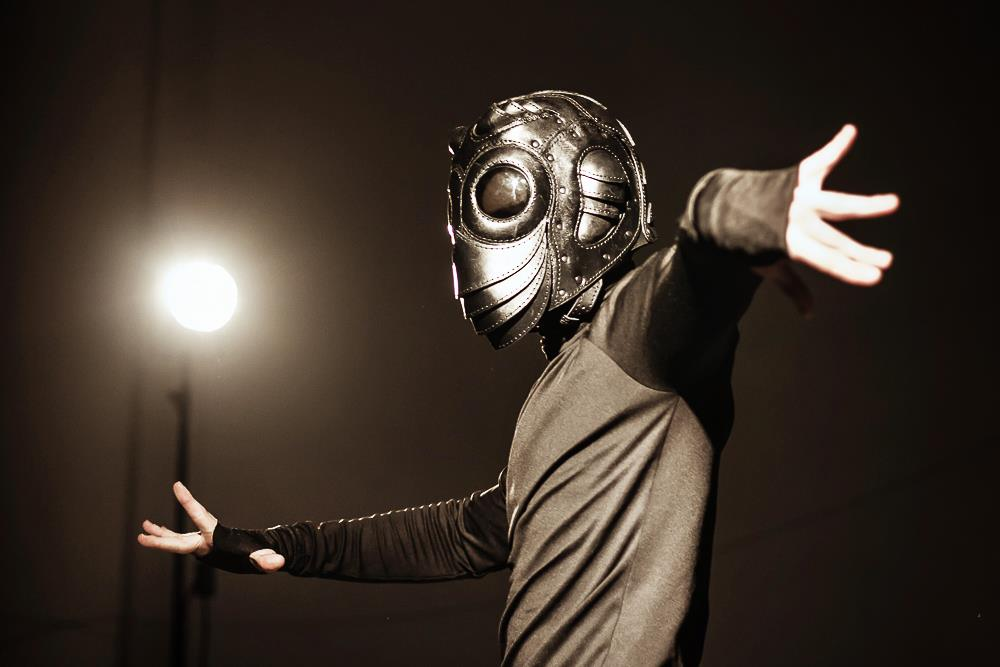
Bob Basset leather mask at the art-performance "Behind the Mask", Gogolfest, 2015

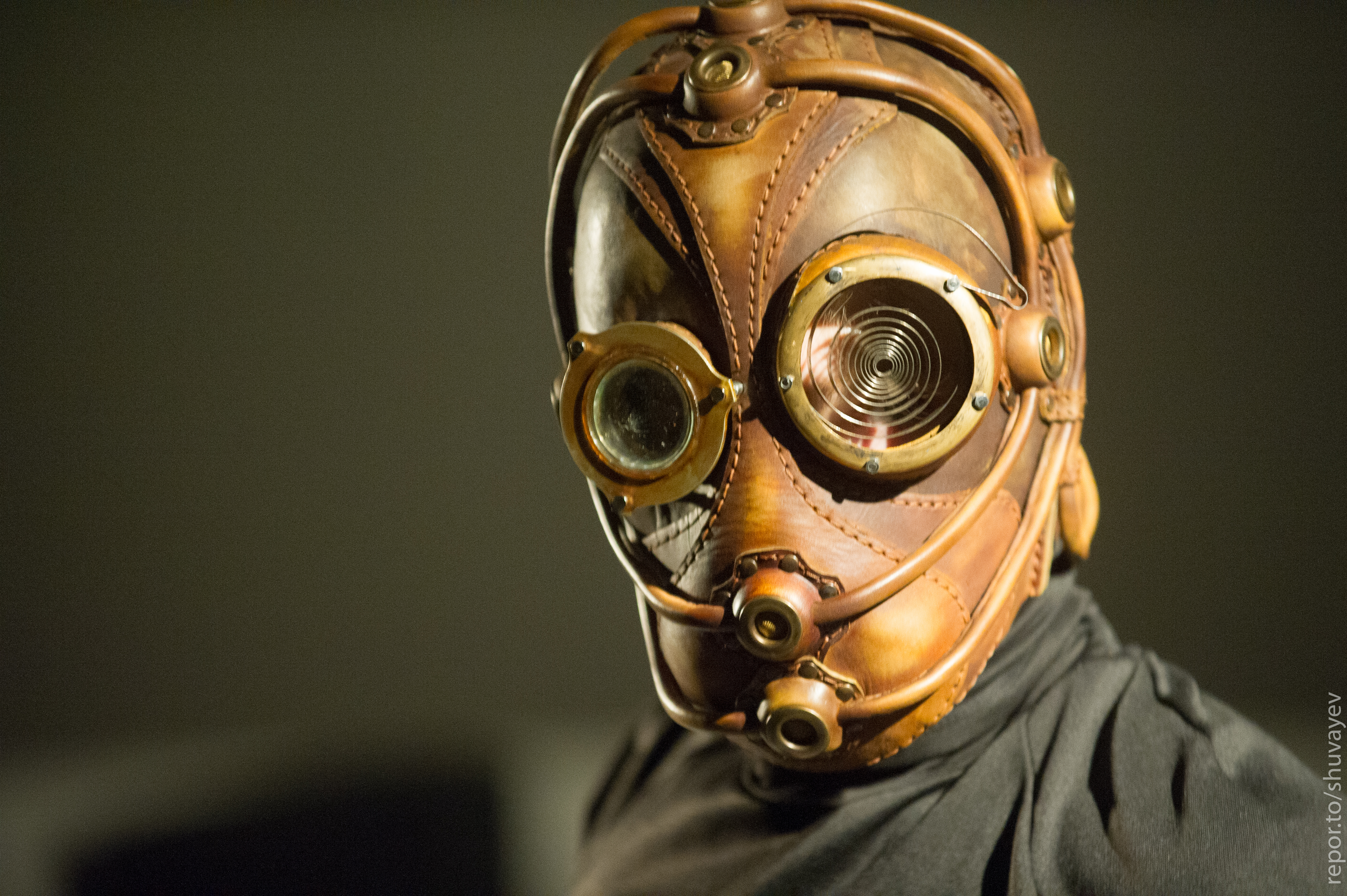
Bob Basset leather mask at the art-performance "Behind the Mask", Gogolfest, 2015

=== Objects d'art ===
==== Masks ====
Masks have become Bob Basset's specialty. He makes unique leather masks for use in a number of different fields such as fashion, music, cinema, and so on.

The studio has more than a thousand masks in its portfolio, including masks representing demons, zombies, unicorns, aliens, various animals, and dragons. Bob Basset created a number of different skull and horse masks, as well as a mask with horns that look like claws. Some of the Bob Basset masks are his famous masks for Sid Wilson, the Plague Doctor mask, the Cthulhu mask, the David Michelangelo mask, a mask that looks like Darth Vader’s helmet, and an Orthodox Van Helsing (which has a speaker to scare away demons). All of the Bob Basset masks have a complicated structure; some of them have built-in cooling systems, 3D-glasses, and lasers.

Bob Basset has made masks for bikers, a motorcycle helmet for a private collection, and a biker's mask for the Iron Custom Motorcycles speed record project Inspirium.

In 2026, archival Bob Basset masks became the basis for three complete looks in the MUTABOR collection — Dog, Horse and Bird. The masks were supplemented with constructions for the arms and legs, costume elements and accessories that alter the silhouette and movement of the human body. In this way, masks created by the studio in different years became parts of complete fashion looks.

==== Dragons ====
Co-founder, Oleg Petrov, has been fascinated by dragons since childhood, so dragons became one of the main subjects manufactured by the Bob Basset studio. A number of dragon pieces were created throughout the years, including bags, helmets, toys, masks, and costumes.

In 2006, the studio presented the Dragon Backpack, which became famous on the internet. As of 2018, twelve years after the first presentation, the backpack remains still popular among leather-item lovers. In 2015, the news about Bob Basset's Dragon Backpack replica was reposted nearly 100 000 times and liked around 44 000 times on Facebook.

Eventually, the original backpack was sold to a private collection and Bob Basset created a replica that also received wide discussion.

==== Other items ====
Over the years, the Bob Basset studio produced a collection of "strange artwork" for example, a device that helps one to connect with aliens, a system of hiding places for one's house, and a turtle which served as a knife container. At some point, the studio created sapphire knives and leather wings with a wingspan of four meters.

In 2011, the studio created leather Christmas tree decorations in steampunk style.

Leather items by Bob Basset

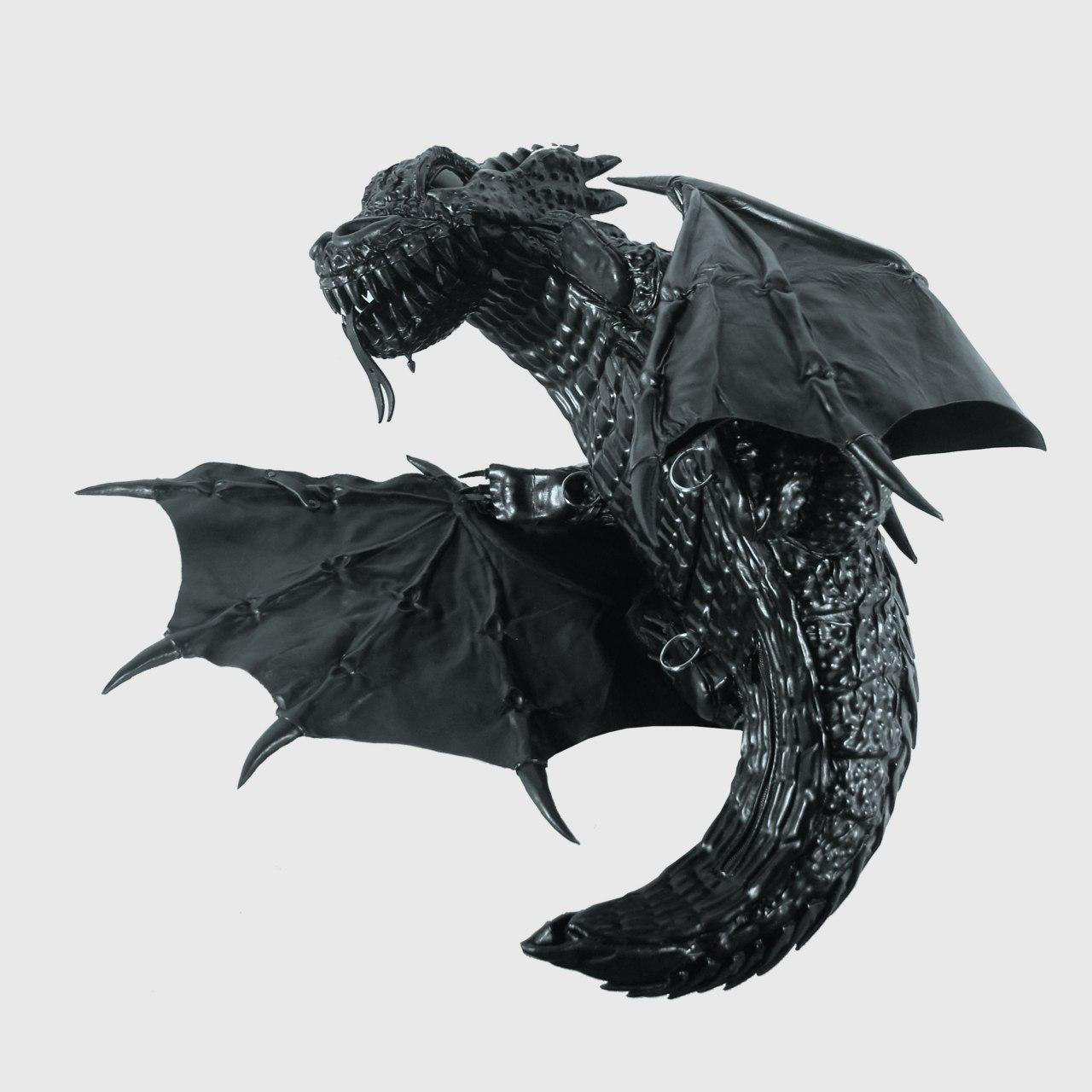
Bob Basset's Dragon Backpack.

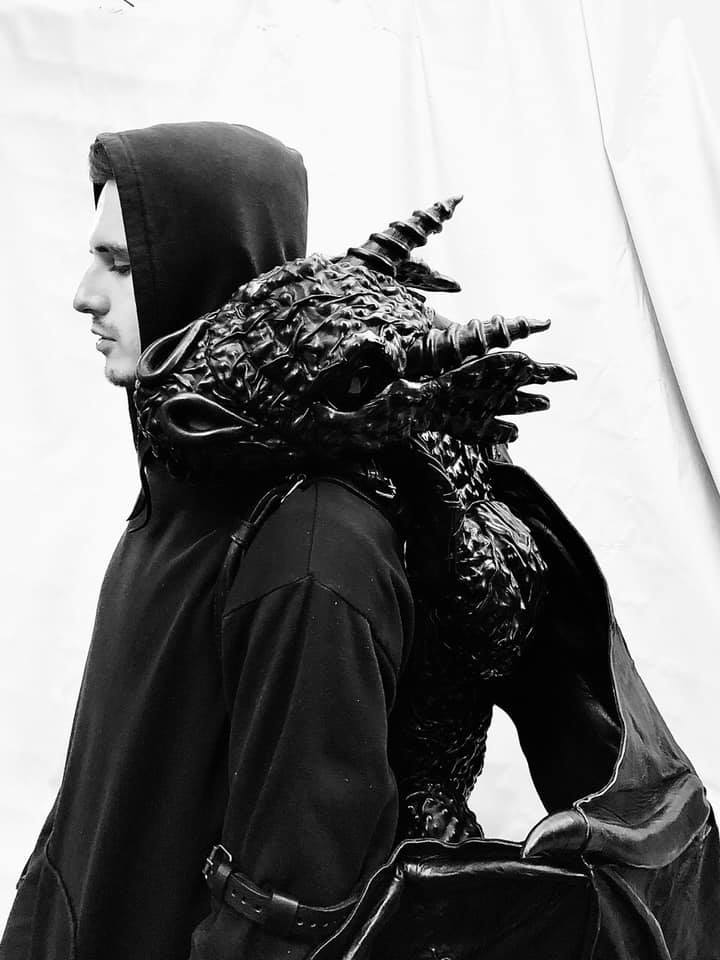
Man wearing Bob Basset's Dragon Backpack.

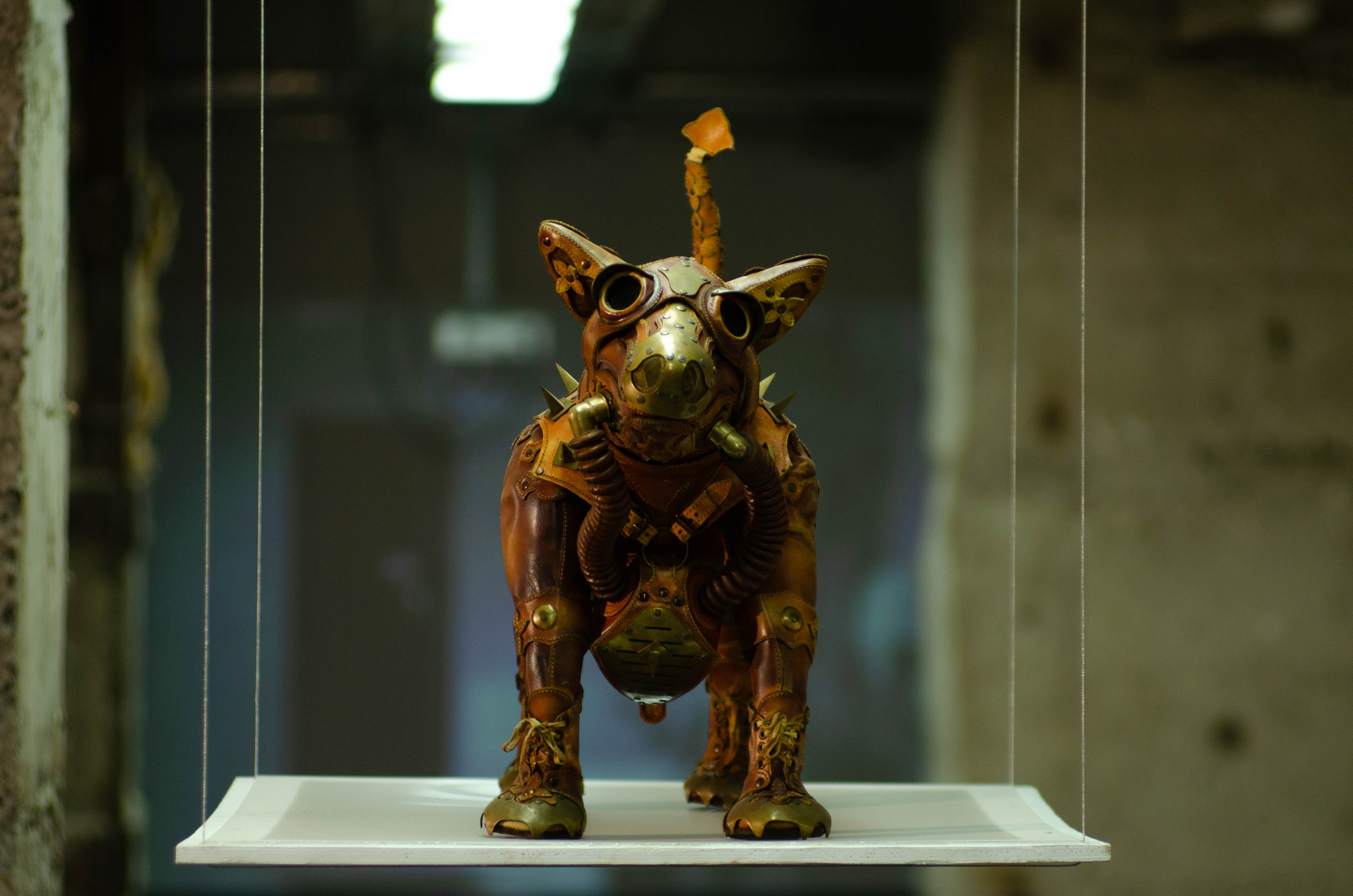
Bob Basset's steampunk dog.

== History ==
=== Oleg's influence ===
The Bob Basset brand was founded in 1989 as a leather workshop in Kharkiv, Ukraine by brothers Oleg and Serhii Petrov. The studio was named after Oleg Petrov's dog, a Basset Hound named Bob.

Before "Bob Basset" was used as the studio name, it was a nickname for older Oleg. Oleg, whose first specialty was metallurgy, started to work with leather as a teenager. The book Two Little Savages, by Ernest Thompson Seton, inspired him to work with leather, and he started to sew Indian clothes at about twelve years old. He made his first leather boots at the age of fourteen. In adulthood, Oleg continued to make his own footwear, and became interested in creating leather accessories, including women's hand-bags. By the time he helped found Bob Basset, he had worked with leather for twenty years, learning the craft from old books on leather, chemistry, and technology.

The workshop officially became the Bob Basset art studio in the 2000s. From the beginning, Oleg was the lead founder. He wanted the studio to create items that "have never been made before." To ensure his creations were unique and came solely from his imagination, he lived in isolation from art books, television, blogs, and even people.

=== Early history: the first decade ===
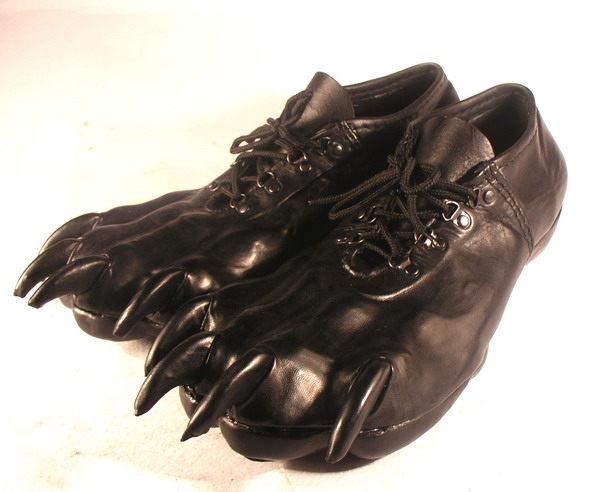
Bob Basset Paw Shoes

In 1988, when the celebration of Halloween was just becoming common in Soviet Union through American movies, the Petrov brothers created around ten carnival masks, which they later sold. In 1989, the workshop turned its attention to work on leather accessories.

At first, the Petrov brothers didn't have enough money to afford materials, but they kept working to achieve their "ambitious goals." By 2001, with initial capital of $50, the workshop started to make leather items for Ukrainian sex shops. The internet was young at the time, so the brothers had to promote their products in person. Serhii Petrov travelled all around Ukraine to promote and deliver their leather creations. The studio was then the only local leather-item manufacturers that supplied sex shops.

Eventually, the Ukrainian media became interested in Bob Basset products, but Oleg Petrov felt that working in the sex industry was "not the best way to achieve immortality," so he started to sell products on eBay instead of proceeding as a supplier.

The eBay shop attracted an audience, and the brothers started to work on commission. Later, Bob Basset products were also available for purchase on Makers Market, another online handcraft marketplace. In 2006, the brothers displayed their creations to the public on a Bob Basset account on LiveJournal, a global blogging platform.

In April 2007, Bob Basset presented the Cthulhu mask.

With the growing popularity on the internet, Bob Basset started gaining fans and clients. By 2008, the studio started to be recognized internationally with a number of articles and mentions of their work in magazines and online.

In 2009, Bob Basset presented the leather Paw Shoes and "lace-up, claw-bearing" mittens. Photos of the Bob Basset Paw Shoes were published in The New York Times Magazine.

In 2009, the studio made seven or eight masks for the Carl Erik Rinsch short movie called The Gift, which was part of a collaboration of five filmmakers named Parallel Lines and presented by the Ridley Scott Associates production company (RSA Films). However, only four of the masks were eventually used in the project.

=== History: the second decade ===
==== Serhii's leadership ====
Oleg Petrov died in 2011, and his younger brother Serhii continued the business alone. Twelve years younger than his brother, Serhii also chose the manufacture of leather items as his main occupation. In the 1990s, he tried a number of other jobs, including establishing businesses and working in promotion. His work on Bob Basset goods became a "hobby," but later he returned to the art studio full-time.

After his brother's death, Serhii Petrov intended to produce all the artwork himself. He refused to leave the original Bob Basset workshop, which was located in the garage of a private house on the outskirts of Kharkiv. Serhii became the face of the brand and the main artist behind it. He ran the business, controlled the manufacture process, produced ideas, and managed staff.

Serhii Petrov considers himself to be the founder of the original concept of the steampunk gas mask. When the brothers started to list their creations on eBay, there were around 700 items under the term "steampunk." Bob Basset successfully distanced their inventory from these items by pioneering “steampunk gas mask” term.

==== Global recognition ====
In autumn 2010, Vogue Hommes published a ten-page photo shoot with models styled by Panos Yiapanis. Bob Basset leather masks were worn by every model, complementing outfits provided by fashion brands Yves Saint Laurent, Givenchy, Prada, Marc Jacobs, Louis Vuitton, and others.

In 2010, Italian clothing designer Riccardo Tisci ordered Bob Basset masks for the 2011 Givenchy Spring-Summer Men's Collection fashion show. To make the seven masks in time, the studio worked around the clock for four days.

The collection, with Bob Basset leather masks as the main accessory, was presented at the Paris Fashion Week. Later, the masks were used at a photo shoot for Givenchy promotion posters and were displayed in Givenchy boutique showcases.

After the partnership with Givenchy, Bob Basset became recognized all around the world. Only after becoming popular abroad, did the studio gain recognition on the same level in its native country, Ukraine.

==== Further partnerships ====
In 2012, Bob Basset partnered on projects with two Ukrainian brands: sasha.kanevski and L'UVE (partnering with the designer Valeria Kovalska).

In 2017, Bob Basset masks were used in a fashion show by the Italian brand Balossa. The collection was presented at the Lviv Fashion Week 2017, and all the models' looks were complemented with Bob Basset masks and accessories. A year later, Bob Basset provided masks for the shoe brand Ganor Dominic's photo shoot.

Bob Basset worked on a gaming design for the international company Plarium, which has an office in Kharkiv, Ukraine.

=== History: the third decade ===
==== Bob Basset art studio during the Russian invasion ====
At the beginning of the Russian invasion, Serhii Petrov was forced to evacuate from Kharkiv to Lviv with a minimal amount of tools and equipment. According to him, the Kharkiv workshop was not damaged by shelling, but it is dangerous to work in a city that is shelled almost every day. In Lviv, he created a workshop, continues to make masks and helps the army - he collects money for gas masks, established the production of body armor. "There is no place in the world where it would be as good for me to live and work as in Kharkiv. I will definitely return to Kharkiv", says Petrov.

Bob Basset provided art objects as lots for two auctions of war trophies and art "History in Objects", which took place in the Lviv Municipal Art Center in the summer of 2022. One of the objects was sold for ₴55,000 (USD 1900 approx.) at the starting price ₴29,542, becoming the most expensive lot of the first auction. In total, ₴205,510 was collected at the auction. The funds were directed to the UAID charity fund for the purchase of needed items for the front line.

During the war, Serhiy Petrov began to use spent bullet cartridges from the battlefield as elements of masks. "Each piece has a story. Maybe it was someone's last bullet", said Petrov during an interview for the New York Times.

In 2022, Serhiy Petrov was included in the anthology of modern Ukrainian visual art "Unknown Art. Artistic reflections. Ukraine after 2013" by Olesya Gerashchenko (Shambur), published by “Osnovy” publishing house. The collection with 100 reproductions and 50 interviews with artists, art critics and curators included "Maidan Mask", created by the studio in 2013.

The Art Studio and Serhii Petrov became one of the heroes of David Gutnik's documentary film "Rule of Two Walls", which examines the war in Ukraine through the prism of the vision of artists who live and create during hostilities. The image of Serhii Petrov became the official poster of the film. The world premiere took place in June 2023 at the Tribeca Festival, where the film received special jury mention for human rights and artistic expression. The film became a participant of the international and national competitions at the XIV Odessa International Film Festival and received the Special Award of the International Competition.

In September, the art studio presented its new work in collaboration: a black leather mask in the shape of a skull, decorated with silver details of the Kyiv brand Sania.Jeweler.

In September 2024, Bob Basset's works were selected to participate in the Homo Faber Biennale of Contemporary Crafts in Venice. However, not all works were delivered for the exhibition: one of the masks of the art studio uses firearm cartridges, which caused questions at customs.

As of 2026, Arina Petrova is a designer and creative director at Bob Basset.

===== Gas masks for Ukraine =====
At the beginning of March, a philanthropic initiative called "Gas Masks For Ukraine" was instigated by Bob Bassett and Kirill Kislyakov. The core objective of this project was to amass funds to procure gas masks for Ukrainians. This was a response to the imminent threat of potential chemical warfare in densely populated areas during that period. Andrii Hubskyi, a Ukrainian researcher who developed the platform that facilitated the draw, provided the raffle assistance. The lottery officially commenced on April 12, with each ticket being priced at 30 euros. By April 24, the initiative had sold 50% of the tickets. By May 3, all available tickets were sold, demonstrating high public interest and support. The winning ticket was revealed in a live announcement on May 4. Finally, the proceeds from the lottery were utilized to purchase gas masks, with the first batch of purchases completed on June 16. According to Serhii Petrov, the gas masks were sent to the Kherson area and to Kharkiv region for the National Guard.

===== Mask for a Hero =====
Bob Basset made a mask for famous Ukrainian lawyer and serviceman Masi Nayem, who lost an eye at the war. The mask "protects part of the face and the eye... it is fastened on two straps and does not interfere with movement". According to Serhii Petrov, this project is also important for him for personal reasons: he himself has eye problems and has been ashamed of his strabismus for years, and used to make a similar mask for himself. Later, Serhii Petrov promised to make several similar masks for other defenders of Ukraine who lost an eye in the battle. Subsequently, the project was named "Mask for a Hero" and supported by the Institut für die Wissenschaften vom Menschen in Vienna within the Institute's Documenting Ukraine program. The next owner of the eye mask was a Ukrainian soldier, a fighter of the Azov regiment, with the call sign Krishna, who was wounded in Mariupol.

=== Controversies ===
In 2012, Bob Basset's steampunk gas mask was plagiarized by the company Design Toscano, which put their version up for sale on eBay as an originally designed product. Later, Design Toscano apologized, blaming a designer who stole the idea. Eventually, Bob Basset received a royalties for the design.

== Arenas of success ==
Despite the fact that Bob Basset masks and items are often used in various industries, Petrov himself perceives his work and items as art, rather than fashion accessories.

=== Recognition ===
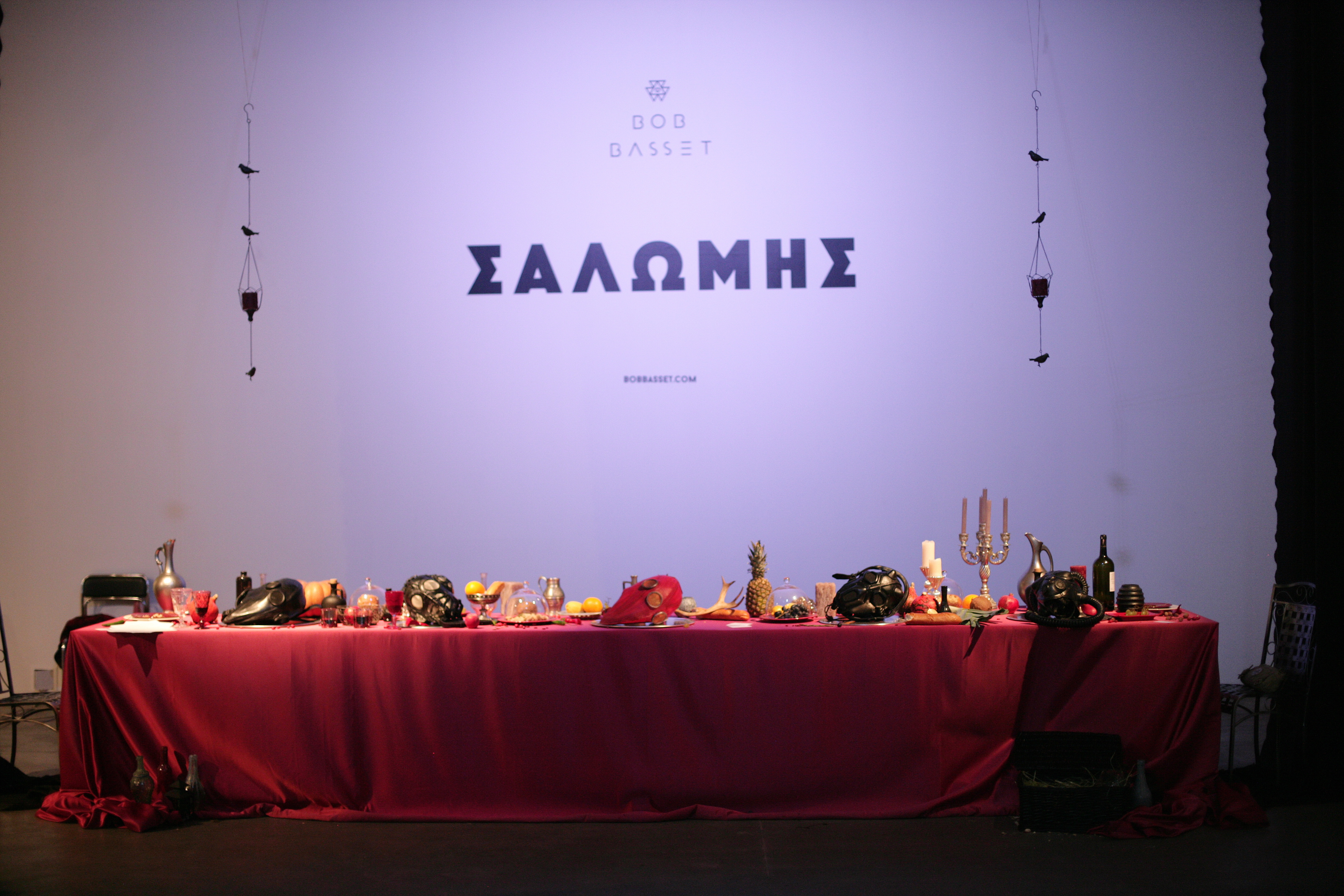
Bob Basset ΣΑΛΩΜΗΣ collection presentation.

In 2016, Vogue International listed Bob Basset as one of nine revolutionary Ukrainian designers. The studio's art was published in the magazines Vogue International, The New York Times Fashion Magazine, WAD, Vice U.K., Bizarre, METCHA, L'Uomo Vogue, INSIDE Artzine, Trendson, and others.

William Gibson, who is credited as the founder of the steampunk style, declared Bob Basset's products "almost the only existing model of the genre." After receiving Gibson's endorsement, people started to refer to Bob Basset as the "guru of the contemporary steampunk."

The studio once ran a private exhibition for filmmaker and artist David Lynch when he visited Kyiv, Ukraine. Lynch greatly appreciated the exhibition.

Another Bob Basset customer is Cory Doctorow, the post-cyberpunk and science fiction author and a co-editor of the blog Boing Boing. A number of Bob Basset pieces are owned by Garick Karogodskiy, a businessman, writer, and blogger from Kyiv, and Evgeny Chichvarkin, a Russian businessman and entrepreneur.

Bob Basset masks are often bought for the international and Ukrainian private collections. As of 2017, the biggest Ukrainian Bob Basset collection, containing 22 masks, belonged to Kiyv restaurateur, Dmitry Borisov.

A number of masks belong to an international collection of Richard Neufeld (a coordinator of design and visual art program in Canadian Cambrian College), and in 2018 were provided by the owner for the Curious Couture: Fab Fashions & Personal Collections exhibition in Sudbury, Canada.

=== Fashion shows and collections ===
In 2013, Bob Basset masks were presented at the Berlin Fashion Week show in partnership with Ukrainian brand sasha.kanevski.

In 2014, Bob Basset presented a new collection of masks and accessories called "Mashrabiya" during the Ukrainian Fashion Week. The main element of the collection was a pattern from traditional Arabic architecture. Beside masks, the collection included leather accessories such as bags, clutches, bracelets, and iPad cases.

The next year, a new Bob Basset mask collection named "ΣΑΛΩΜΗΣ" was presented at the Ukrainian Fashion Week 2015. The collection consisted of five items that could be used as both masks and handbags.

In 2015–2016, Bob Basset created ironic collections of masks for eggs. A 2015 collection, named "Survivors" portrayed eggs that survived Easter wearing mini-versions of masks created in previous years. The 2016 egg-mask collection, named "Calvary" (or Golgotha), consisted of mini-versions of other Bob Basset masks meaningful to the creator, and portrayed the participants of an "evangelical crucifixion." In 2019, as the World Record Egg became popular around the world, Bob Basset's egg exposition gained new meaning.

In 2017, Bob Basset masks were exhibited in the Italian clothing brand Balossa's collection at the Lviv Fashion Week fashion show.

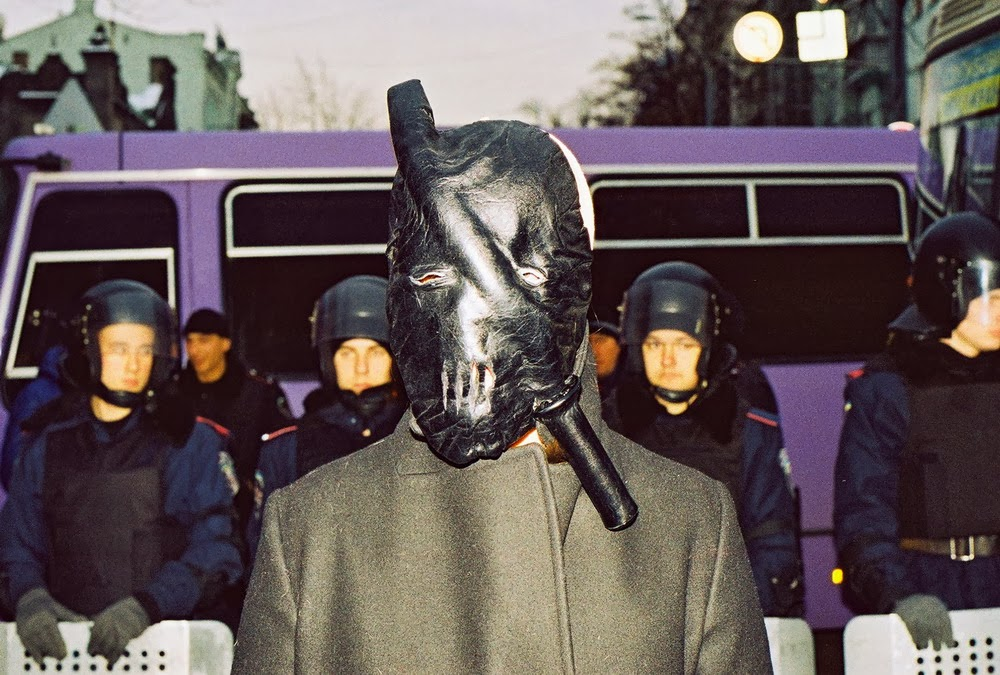
Bob Basset Mask of Maidan created during the Ukrainian revolution of 2013–2014

In 2019, Bob Basset presented his new collection "Turnskin."

In 2026, at Ukrainian Fashion Week Spring–Summer 2027, Bob Basset presented MUTABOR, the studio's first full fashion collection since 2015. The collection combined iconic art objects from the Bob Basset archive, reinterpreted using new technologies, with newly created pieces. Its concept is based on the transformation of three figures — Dog, Horse and Bird — and symbolizes the gradual transformation of both the human body and the art studio itself. MUTABOR the Anubis mask and Dog Paws (both from 2009), the Pony Mask (2011), and the Plague Doctor mask (2015). The collection marked Arina Petrova’s debut. ELLE Ukraine noted that in MUTABOR, Bob Basset “balances at the intersection of fashion, art and object design”.

=== Special projects ===
Bob Basset created a mask for a bull terrier dog once, but later gave up on the idea, seeing it as animal abuse. Later the idea was re-imagined into a leather steampunk dog, which was a popular item in many exhibitions. Serhii Petrov cherished it as a piece of art and as a memory, for it was based on a real-life dog, which Serhii's family rescued from the street.

In 2016, Bob Basset created a biker's mask for an Iron Custom Motorcycles speed record motorcycle project called Inspirium.

During the Ukrainian revolution of 2013–2014, Serhii Petrov took part in several pro-Ukrainian protests in Kharkiv. These events influenced both his politics and his art. "Before 2014 I did not give any importance to my origins: nothing, in my art, spoke of Ukraine. At the time I just wanted to be an artist of the world. After that year, being Ukrainian took on a completely different weight. My national identity has started to make itself felt more and more, even if what I do continues to have a global character" says Petrov. At the end of 2013, Bob Basset presented the Mask of Maidan, which looks like a baton smashing the face of its wearer. The photo of the mask was published in Dazed magazine.

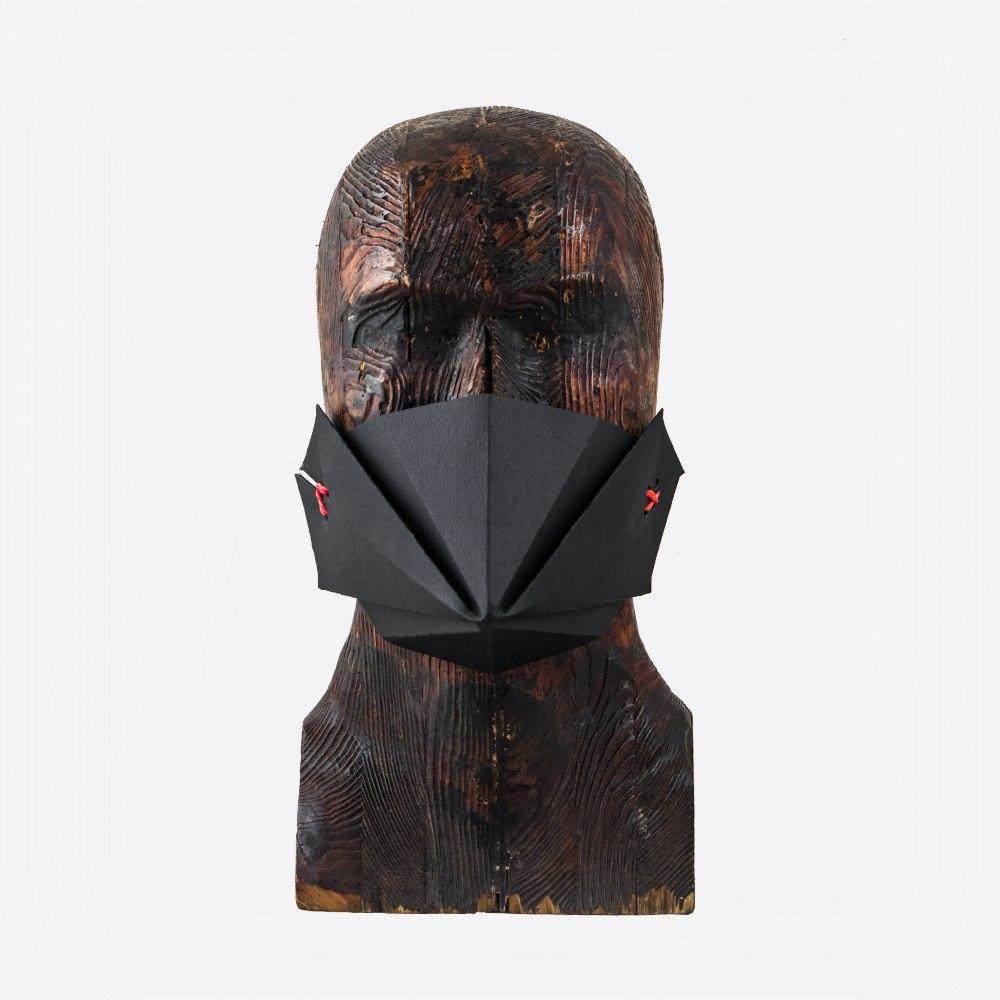
Bob Basset's COVID-19 pandemic mask.

The Mask of Maidan became a symbol of political repressions in Ukraine. It was dedicated to the media representatives who worked in war zones and suffered injuries there. In 2014, the mask was auctioned on eBay, and the studio donated all of the profit to Hromadske.TV, which, in Petrov's opinion, was one of the last representatives of independent Ukrainian journalism. During the Ukrainian revolution and the beginning of the Made in Ukraine Movement, Bob Basset received another spur of recognition in its native country.

In 2016, Bob Basset partnered with another Ukrainian artist for the first time: Gamlet Zinkivskyi. The project was a video called "Secret Room" that was presented at the Addiction a L’oeuvre festival in Paris.

During the 2020 COVID-19 pandemic, Bob Basset created a design for a new mask that could be used as a temporary replacement for or in addition to virus-protection masks. The mask's design is simple, and making it requires only five minutes, an A4 paper sheet, several stationery rubber bands, and scissors. Serhii Petrov said that his mask could be useful in prevention of the virus' spread through airborne droplets if a sick person wore it, but emphasized that it didn't directly protect people from the virus.

=== Music videos and musicians ===
In 2013, Sid Wilson from the band Slipknot asked the studio to make him a mask for his live performances. As of 2020, Bob Basset has made seven custom masks for the Slipknot turntablist to wear in music videos and during live performances. All of the Sid Wilson masks are unique; in creating "fan versions," Serhii Petrov made intentional changes, discussed with customers before purchase. In 2022, Bob Basset continued their collaboration with Slipknot and created a new mask for Slipknot's Sid Wilson. The mask was specially designed for the release of the single The Dying Song, which will be included on the new album The End, So Far. In a new look, Wilson stole the show with his appearance in "The Dying Song (Time to Sing)” music video, Revolver admits. According to Serhiy Petrov, Sid Wilson now has about 15 Bob Basset masks in his collection, but only 7 of them he ordered directly from the art studio: he bought all the others on the secondary market.

In 2013, a Bob Basset mask appeared in Avril Lavigne's music video of the song "Rock'N'Roll."

Zac Baird, a keyboardist from the rock band Korn, wore Bob Basset masks during his performances. A mask in the form of a horse head was created in 2010 for him. In 2013, a Bob Basset mask appeared in the Metallica movie Metallica: Through the Never. The studio's masks were also used in music videos of the Otep and Tantric bands.

In 2016, Bob Basset masks were used for a photo project shot by the photographer Dmitry Komissarenko in Design Scene magazine. The masks were worn by the duet Beissoul & Einius.

In 2018, Bob Basset masks became the key accessory in the duo's new music video for the song "Rooftops."

In 2020, Bob Basset masks "Steam Vibes" and "Loudspeaker Master" were used in a music video for the song "Flames" by British pop-singer Zayn featuring British musicians Jungleboi and Dutch DJ R3hab.

Swedish rock band Ghost has ordered 8 masks from Bob Basset for the Imperatour 2022 world tour. Products in the form of gas masks are created in a style close to steampunk from leather, brass and horns (they were made from real cow horns). The studio for the first time made copies of one product, Serhii Petrov says, because Ghost required 8 custom-made masks. Also, two-meter dragon wings were made by Bob Basset for the soloist of the band.

=== Movies ===
Bob Basset studio items are often used in the cinematic world. The masks were used in a promo for the American TV show The Last Ship; Hollywood actress Elizabeth Banks used a mask from the collection "Mashrabiya" in her photo shoot for the Flaunt Magazine in 2014; and a mask was made for the main character in a New Zealand movie, The Dwarves of Demrel.

In 2009, Carl Erik Rinsch used Bob Basset masks in a short movie called The Gift, a Parallel Lines project produced by the Ridley Scott Associates (RSA Films) production company. Bob Basset masks were also used in Michael Bay productions.

Bob Basset masks for Sid Wilson and Elizabeth Banks

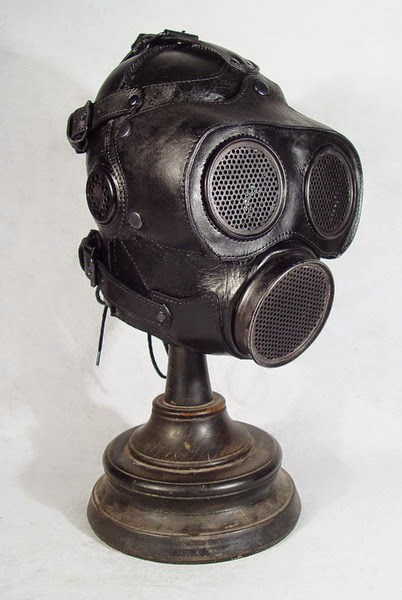
Bob Basset mask for Sid Wilson.

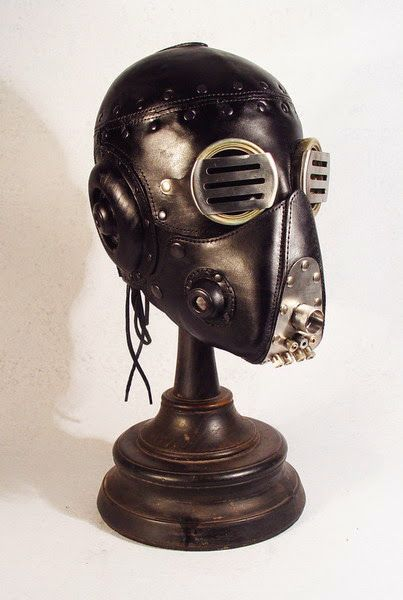
Bob Basset mask for Sid Wilson.

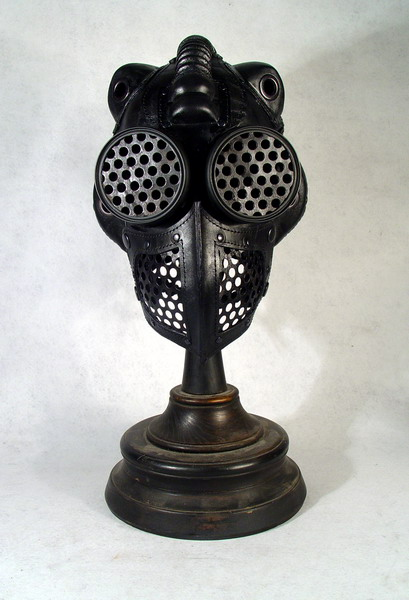
Bob Basset mask for Sid Wilson.

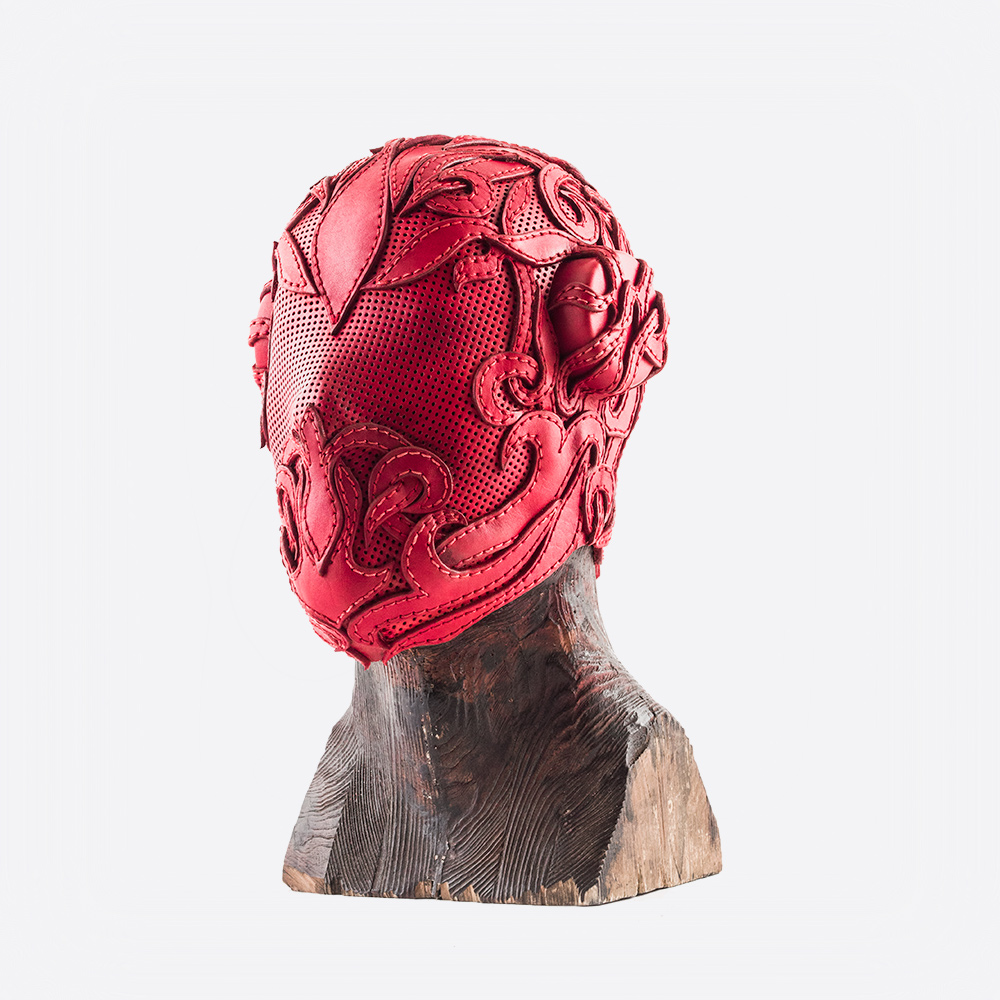
Bob Basset mask from the collection "Mashrabiya," used in Elizabeth Banks' photo shoot for the Flaunt Magazine.

=== Exhibitions ===
Bob Basset art has been presented all over Europe, in the US and in the U.K. Petrov visited and exhibited in Paris, New York, London, Milan, Lima (Peru), Seoul, Tokio, Beijing, Hong Kong, Kyiv, Kharkiv, Donetsk and many other cities.

As most Bob Basset pieces have been purchased by international collectors, it wasn't easy to arrange an exhibition in Ukraine, but in 2017, Bob Basset hosted a preview of the studio's first ever retrospective exhibition, Entity, in parfum büro gallery in Kyiv, Ukraine. Later the same year, the exhibition was displayed at the Bereznitsky Aesthetics gallery in Kyiv. Many of the exhibited items were borrowed for display from private collections in Paris, New York, Tokio, Milan, Seoul, and London.

Also in 2017, Bob Basset was first exhibited in the studio's native city, Kharkiv, Ukraine. The special exhibition, Art&Fashion: New Dimension, was held at the Yermilov Centre during Museum Night, an international project with more than 1,000 world institutions participating. The Bob Basset exhibition was considered one of the main events of the whole Museum Night project, and was available to the public for only one night.

At the exhibition, Bob Basset presented new items–art skulls–made in partnership with Ukrainian artists Gamlet Zinkivskyi and Alina Zamanova as well as different masks from the ΣΑΛΩΜΗΣ collection, Cyber Dog, mini-mummies, and other objects. During the event, Bob Basset and Gamlet Zinkivskyi announced their future joint exhibition Objects.

In 2018, Peruvian artist Conrad Florez invited Bob Basset and Gamlet Zinkivskyi to bring their art to an exhibition in Lima, Peru. Ukrainian artists took part in the exhibition negro at the Monumental Callao Art center alongside Conrad Florez and another artist, Andrea Barreda. Bob Basset presented six masks in Lima. Later, a local gallery owner purchased both Bob Basset and Zinkivskyi pieces.

Bob Basset gifted two masks to Conrad Florez, who painted them in his style. These masks, which Petrov called "a unique example of Ukrainian-Peruvian art," were also exhibited at the Lima exhibition. The Ukrainian artists took part in a photo project on Lima streets called Carnavale.

In 2018, the first joint exhibition of Bob Basset and Gamlet Zinkivskyi, Objects, took place in the Yermilov Centre in the artists' native city Kharkiv, Ukraine. More than 2,000 people visited the exhibition during the first weekend, and more than 15,000 people visited during the whole run making it the most visited exhibition in the history of the art center at the time.

The exhibition was created in the "ready-made" style which is aimed at "bringing the object from non-artistic space to the artistic and changing the perception of it." Bob Basset presented nineteen leather masks and a steampunk dog. Their "Secret Room" video was displayed. Visitors could "try on" some of Bob Basset masks via a unique construction of mirrors with holes in them etched by amalgam that allowed people looking at them to see their bodies and Bob Basset masks instead of their faces – the first time Petrov displayed his masks in this way. Another exhibition area allowed people to shoot an art object from a rifle as a part of a social experiment. A Bob Basset mask and two of Zinkivskyi's graphic portraits were the targets. Later, the same year, Bob Basset and Zinkivskyi presented the exhibition in the Art Jump gallery, in Poltava, Ukraine.

In 2019, a part of the Objects exhibition and the Bob Basset installation "Calvary" ("Golgotha") were displayed at the Ukrainian Fashion Week. This was the artists' first time at the UFW as a part of partnered project and the first time Bob Basset presented the "Calvary" installation in public.

Bob Basset exhibitions in 2018

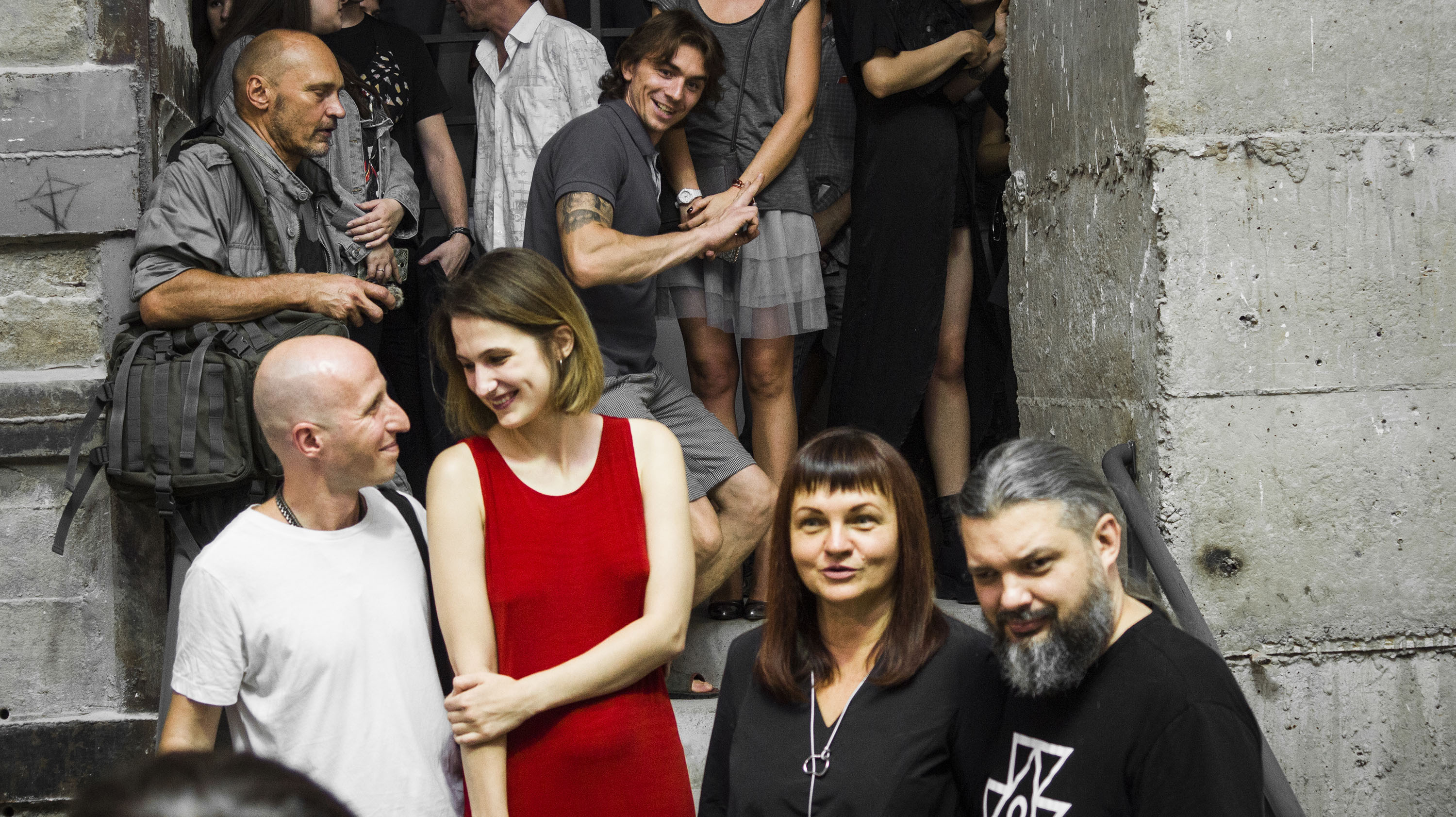
Bob Basset and Gamlet Zinkivskyi at their joint Objects exhibition in Kharkiv, Ukraine, 2018

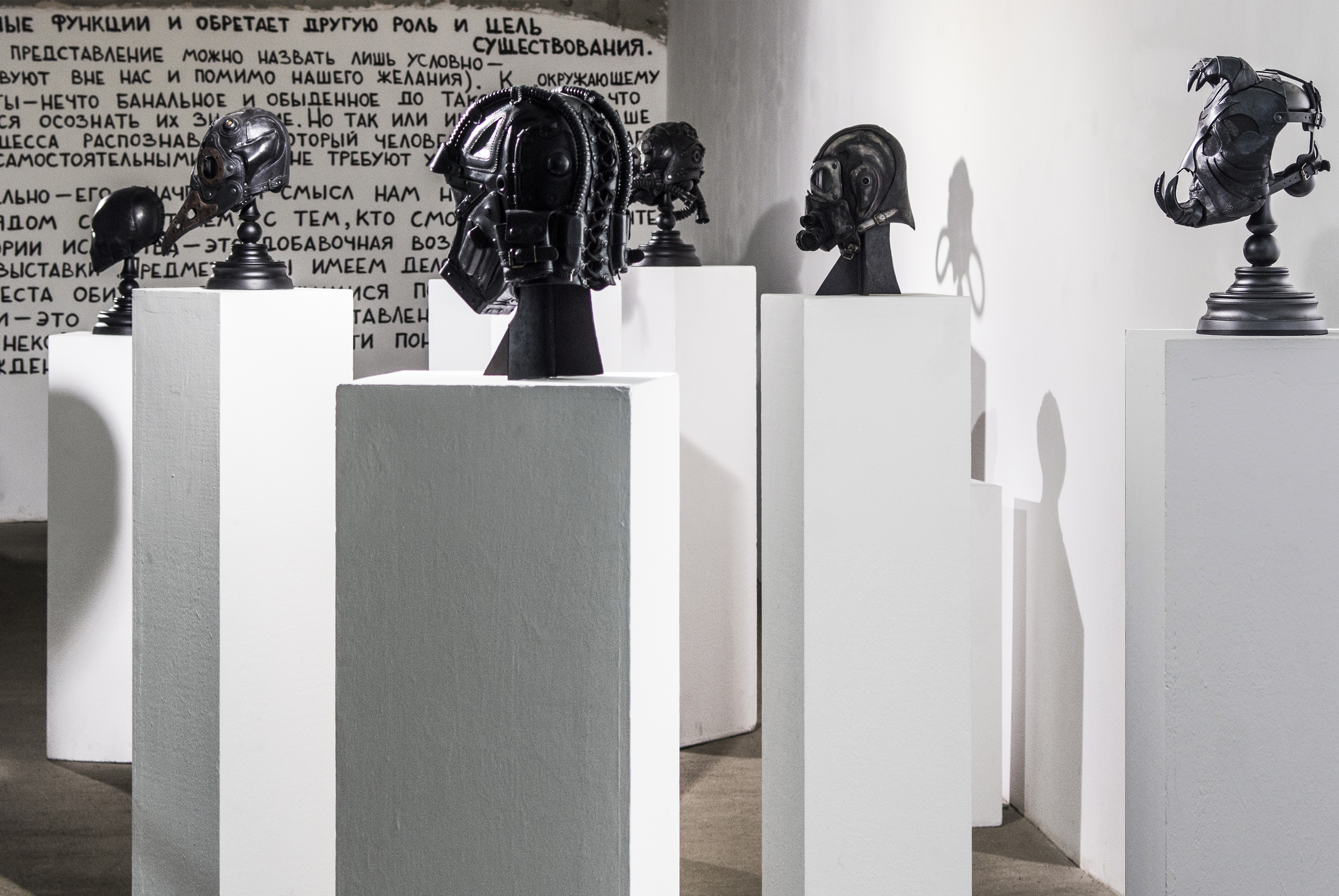
Bob Basset and Gamlet Zinkivskyi exhibition Objects, Kharkiv, Ukraine, 2018

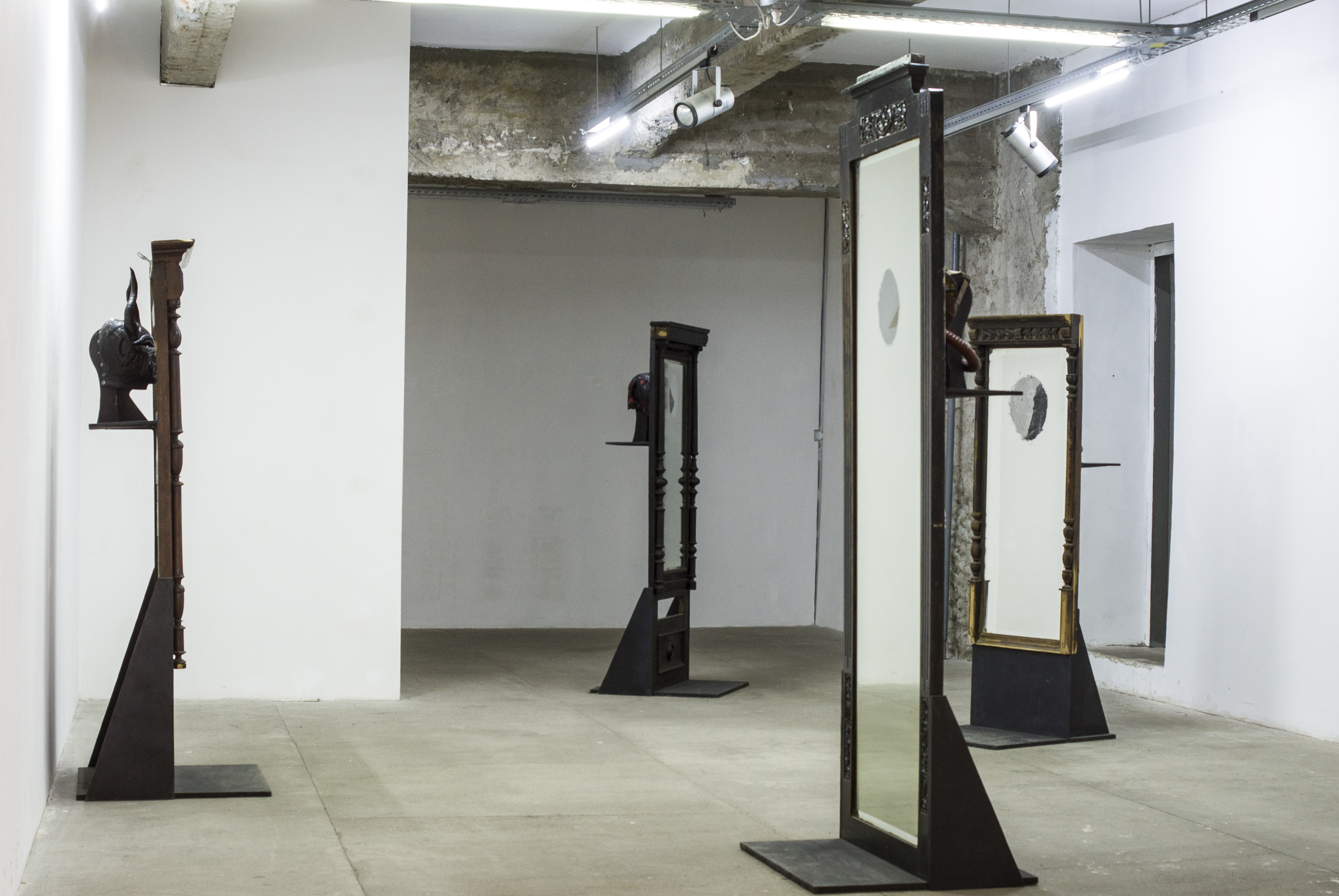
Bob Basset masks and mirrors installation at the Objects exhibition, Kharkiv, Ukraine, 2018

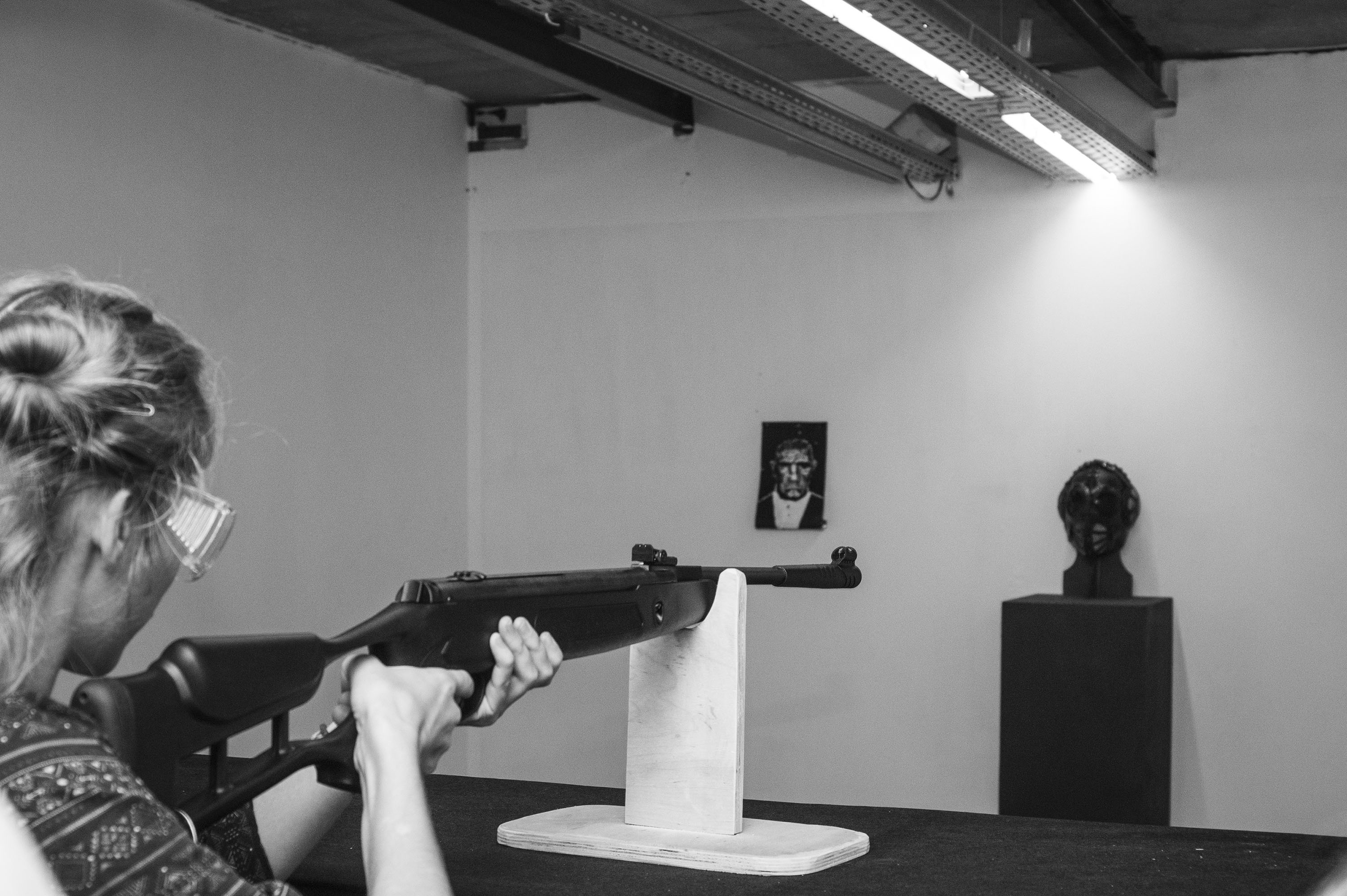
Bob Basset mask and Gamlet Zinkivskyi portraits as targets within an art social experiment. Objects exhibition, Kharkiv, Ukraine, 2018

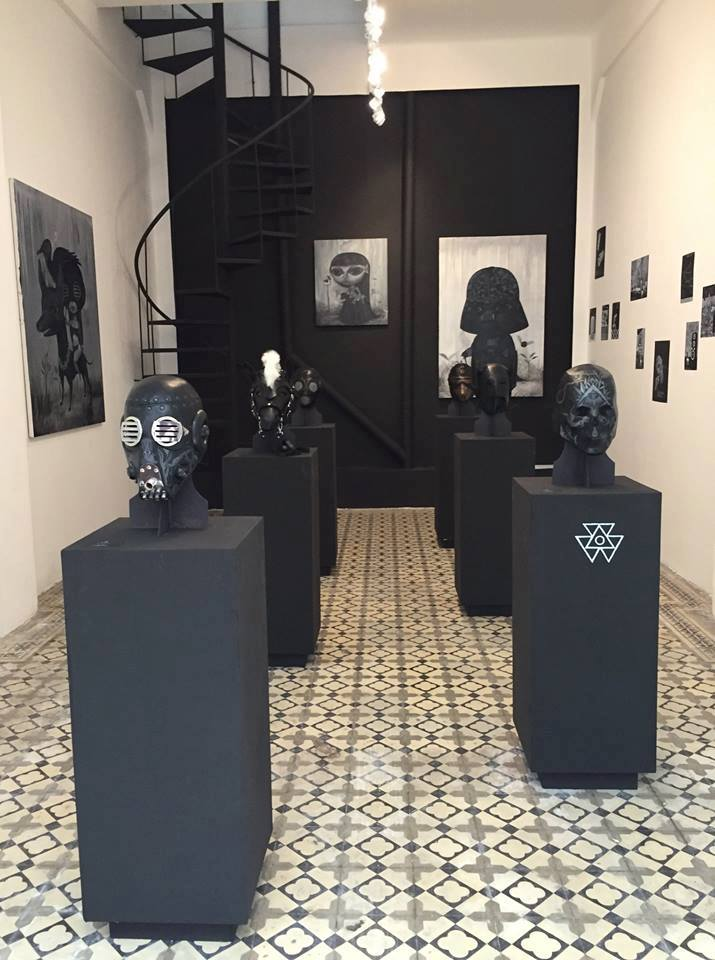
Bob Basset masks at the exhibition negro in Lima, Peru, 2018.

==== List of Exhibitions ====
Year	Name	Location	Gallery	Ref
2026	MUTABOR	(Ukraine) Харків, Україна	Some People	
2026	MUTABOR	Kyiv, Ukraine	Ukrainian Fashion Week, Mysteckiy Arsenal	
2024	Homo Faber 2024: The Journey of Life	Venice, Italy	Fondazione Giorgio Cini	
2022	Sonya Gallery Project	(United States) New York, USA	Sunflower Network project	
2019	Objects	Kyiv, Ukraine	Mystetskyi Arsenal	
2018	negro	Lima, Peru	Monumental Callao art-center	
2018	Objects	Kharkiv, Ukraine	Yermilov Centre	
2018	Objects	Poltava, Ukraine	Art Jump	
2017	Creatures	Odessa, Ukraine	Invogue#Art Gallery	
2017	Entity (preview-exhibition)	Kyiv, Ukraine	parfum büro	
2017	Entity	Kyiv, Ukraine	Bereznitsky Aesthetics Gallery	
2017	Art&Fashion: New Dimension	Kharkiv, Ukraine	Yermilov Centre	
2015	Behind the mask	Kyiv, Ukraine	Gogolfest, Expocenter of Ukraine	
2015	URBAN Habitat	Odesa, Ukraine	Yellow Giants gallery	
2014	Through Maidan and Beyond	Vienna, Austria	Architekturzentrum	
2014	Mashrabiya	Kyiv, Ukraine	Ukrainian Fashion Week, Mysteckiy Arsenal	
2014	Asia's First Steampunk Art Exhibition	(South Korea) Korea		
2014	Steampunk Art	Seoul, South Korea		
2014	Steampunk Art	Beijing, China		
2014	Survival is an Art: The Last Ship Experience	(United States) New York		
2013	Futur anterieur/Future Perfect	(United States) New York, Usa		
2013	IV Fine Art Ukraine	Kyiv, Ukraine	Mysteckiy Arsenal	
2013	Masks: on the range of reality	Donetsk, Ukraine	Art Exhibition Centre	
2012	Future Perfect	Paris, France	Galerie Du Jour Agnes B.	
2011	The Great Steampunk Exhibition	(United Kingdom) London, the U.K.		

== See also ==
- Kharkiv
- Givenchy
- Riccardo Tisci
- William Gibson
- Cory Doctorow

== Literature cited ==
- "Retrofuturisme / Steampunk / Archeomodernisme / Expposition collective", galeriedujour.com, Paris: Galerie du jour agnès b., archived from the original on August 15, 2016
- Ivanenko, Vlad (ed.), "Sergej Petrov rasskazal, kak pridumyvajutsja i sozdajutsja samye modnye, dorogie i vostrebovannye v mire maski" Сергей Петров рассказал, как придумываются и создаются самые модные, дорогие и востребованные в мире маски [Sergey Petrov told, how most fashionable, expensive and desired masks in the world are invented and created], Playboy Ukraine (in Russian), Kyiv: Burda Media Ukraine
- Frauenfelder, Mark, ed. (February 18, 2009), "Leather Cthuhlu mask from steampunk gas-mask artist", Boing Boing, Brooklyn: Happy Mutants
- "Our masks in Philips Cinema – Parallel Lines – The Gift, by Carl Erik Rinsch", Bob Basset Lair, Kharkiv: Bob Basset, May 12, 2010, archived from the original on February 16, 2020
- Frauenfelder, Mark, ed. (December 19, 2012), "Ukrainian steampunk mask-maker gets plagiarized by Skymall stalwarts Design Toscano", Boing Boing, Brooklyn: Happy Mutants
- "Redesigned Bob Basset Mask in Metallica 3D movie", Bob Basset Lair, Kharkiv: Bob Basset, August 2, 2013
- "Retrofuturistic Bob Basset Masks to Be Shown in NYC", bobbasset.com, Kharkiv: Bob Basset, September 1, 2013
- Lygachova, Natalija, ed. (February 6, 2014), "Maska Bob Basset prodajet'sja na eBay zarady hromadske.tv" Маска Bob Basset продається на eBay заради hromadske.tv [The Bob Basset mask is being sold on eBay for hromadske.tv], Suspil'ne movlennja (in Russian), Kyiv: Detektor media, archived from the original on October 11, 2016
- Sokolova, Natasha, ed. (March 14, 2014), "Ukrainian Fashion Week", kiev.vgorode.ua (in Russian), Kyiv: UMH group
- Tsukanova, Masha, ed. (March 15, 2014), "Prezentacija novoj kollekcii Bob Basset" Презентация новой коллекции Bob Basset [Bob Basset new collection presentation], Vogue Ukraine (in Russian), New York: Condé Nast, OCLC 947092856
- "Bob Basset Mask Photos Featured at Kiev's Fashion Revolution", bobbasset.com, Kharkiv: Bob Basset, April 1, 2014
- "Survival is an Art", Warner Media, LLC, Dallas: AT&T, June 20, 2014
- "Inside Jean-Louis Deniot's Black Tie Leather Ball", sfluxe.net, San Francisco: San Francisco Luxury Living, January 25, 2015, archived from the original on August 14, 2020
- "Bob Basset Masks Exhibition at Odesa Art Museum", bobbasset.com, Kharkiv: Bob Basset, August 15, 2015
- "Bob Basset Show Off Masks in Gogolfest Performance", bobbasset.com, Kharkiv: Bob Basset, September 27, 2015
- Koshkina, Sonja, ed. (October 16, 2015), "Ukrainskie stimpank-maski stali mirovoj sensaciej" Украинские стимпанк-маски стали мировой сенсацией [Ukrainian steampunk masks became a world sensation], like.lb.ua (in Ukrainian), Kyiv: LB.ua, archived from the original on October 29, 2016
- "Inspirium rider mask", ironmoto.com.ua, Kharkiv: Iron Custom Motors, March 5, 2016
- Leptuga, Elena, ed. (December 30, 2016), "Bob Basset: "Ja sozidaju ― mir reagiruet"" Bob Basset: «Я созидаю ― мир реагирует» [Bob Basset: "I Create - The World Reacts"], nakipelo.ua (in Russian), Kharkiv: GO "Har'kovskij Krizisnyj Infocentr"
- Gricfel'dt, Ljudmila, ed. (January 31, 2017), "Vystavka art-objektov ot vsemirno izvestnoj dizajn-studii Bob Basset" Выставка арт-объектов от всемирно известной дизайн-студии Bob Basset [Exhibition of art objects from the world famous design studio Bob Basset], Viva! (in Russian), Lausanne: Edipresse Group
- "Preview vystavki dizajn-studii Bob Basset v Galeree parfum büro (fotoreportazh)" Preview выставки дизайн-студии Bob Basset в Галерее parfum büro (фоторепортаж) [Preview of the Bob Basset design studio exhibition in the parfum büro gallery (photo report)], parfumburo.ua (in Russian), Kyiv: parfum büro, February 1, 2017, archived from the original on May 4, 2019
- Sushko, Olga, ed. (March 17, 2017), "Otkrytie personal'noj vystavki Bob Basset" Открытие персональной выставки Bob Basset [Opening of the personal exhibition of Bob Bassett], Vogue Ukraine (in Russian), New York: Condé Nast, OCLC 947092856
- Yankovska, Daria, ed. (March 22, 2017), "Balossa x Bob Basset collaboration at Lviv Fashion Week", lvivfashionweek.com, Lviv Fashion Week
- Sokolova, Natasha, ed. (May 17, 2017), "Kozhanye maski i cherepa: v Har'kove pokazhut tvorenija vsemirno izvestnoj studii Bob Basset" Кожаные маски и черепа: в Харькове покажут творения всемирно известной студии Bob Basset [Leather masks and skulls: the creations of the world famous studio Bob Basset will be shown in Kharkov], kh.vgorode.ua (in Russian), Kyiv: UMH group
- Vdovenko, Mikolay, ed. (July 31, 2017), "V odesskoj galeree pokazali bol'shuju kollekciju stimpank masok Bob Basset (foto)" В одесской галерее показали большую коллекцию стимпанк масок Bob Basset (фото) [A large collection of Bob Basset steampunk masks was shown in the Odessa gallery (photo)], culturemeter.od.ua (in Russian), Odessa: Kul'turometr Odessa
- Kosjak, Nikolaj, ed. (August 30, 2017), "Ukrainskaja kul'turnaja revoljucija na fone buksujushhih reform" Украинская культурная революция на фоне буксующих реформ [Ukrainian cultural revolution amid stalled reforms], Rambler (in Russian), Moscow: Rambler Group
- Gentili, Mark, ed. (February 8, 2018), "Love clothes? Then you'll love the Curious Couture exhibit", Sudbury.com, Sault Ste. Marie: Village Media
- Sokolova, Natasha, ed. (February 19, 2018), "Znaj nashih: har'kovskie hudozhniki Bob Basset i Gamlet pokorjajut zagranicu" Знай наших: харьковские художники Bob Basset и Гамлет покоряют заграницу [Know ours: Kharkov artists Bob Basset and Hamlet conquer abroad], kh.vgorode.ua (in Russian), Kyiv: UMH group
- "Predmety. Gamlet Zinkivs'kyj ta Bob Basset" Предмети. Гамлет Зінківський та Bob Basset [Items. Hamlet Zinkowski and Bob Bassett], yermilovcentre.org (in Russian), Kharkiv: YermilovCentre, September 4, 2018, archived from the original on April 4, 2019
- Sokolova, Natasha, ed. (September 5, 2018), "Tehnoromantizm i electrofashion: v Har'kove pokazhut maski ot Bob Basset dlja novogo klipa Beissoul & Einius" Техноромантизм и electrofashion: в Харькове покажут маски от Bob Basset для нового клипа Beissoul & Einius [Techno-romanticism and electrofashion: Bob Bassets masks for the new clip of Beissoul & Einius will be shown in Kharkov], kh.vgorode.ua (in Russian), Kyiv: UMH group
- "Beissoul & Einius Unveil "Rooftop" Music Video", caesarlivenloud.com, Madeira: Caesar Live N Loud, September 11, 2018
- Buzbee, Sally, ed. (September 17, 2018), "HZ Ukraine Iconic Masks", ap.org, New York: The Associated Press, archived from the original on April 17, 2019
- Sokolova, Natasha, ed. (September 17, 2018), "Za tri dnja: vystavku Gamleta i Bob Basset'a posetili 2000 har'kovchan" За три дня: выставку Гамлета и Bob Basset’а посетили 2000 харьковчан [In three days: 2000 Kharkiv citizens visited the exhibition of Hamlet and Bob Basset], kh.vgorode.ua (in Russian), Kyiv: UMH group
- Goloborodyi, Alexey, ed. (October 31, 2018), "Proekt romantika har'kovskih ulic Gamleta i tehnoromantika Bob Basset'a "Predmety"" Проект романтика харьковских улиц Гамлета и техноромантика Bob Basset’а «Предметы» [The project of the romance of the Kharkiv streets of Hamlet and the Bob Basset's techno-romance "Objects"], chernozem.info (in Russian), Kyiv: Chernozem
- Sushko, Olga, ed. (November 6, 2018), "Maska: fotoproekt Bob Basset i Ganor Dominic" Маска: фотопроект Bob Basset и Ganor Dominic [Masks: Photo Project Bob Bassett and Ganor Dominic], Vogue Ukraine (in Russian), New York: Condé Nast, OCLC 947092856
- Shherbina, Sergej, ed. (January 29, 2019), ""Stena s nozhnicami" i maski dlja jaic: Bob Basset i Gamlet Zin'kovskij pokazhut "Predmety" na Ukrainian Fashion Week 2019" "Стена с ножницами" и маски для яиц: Bob Basset и Гамлет Зиньковский покажут "Предметы" на Ukrainian Fashion Week 2019 ["Wall with scissors" and masks for eggs: Bob Basset and Hamlet Zinkovsky will show "Objects" at Ukrainian Fashion Week 2019], rbc.ua (in Russian), Kyiv: RBK-Ukraina
- "Bob Basset and Hamlet Zinkovsky will show "Objects" at Ukrainian Fashion Week 2019", Reflections of the Big City of Kharkiv, Kharkiv: 078.com.ua, January 29, 2019
- "Bob Basset x Hamlet Zinkovskyi "Objects" presentation", fashionweek.ua, Kyiv: Ukrainian Fashion Week, February 3, 2019, archived from the original on February 10, 2019
- "TURNSKIN collection", bobbasset.com, Kharkiv: Bob Basset, December 27, 2019
- "Milestones", bobbasset.com, Kharkiv: Bob Basset, 2020
- "Bob Basset got published in L'Uomo Vogue", bobbasset.com, Kharkiv: Bob Basset, January 14, 2020
- Bacman, Alesja, ed. (January 30, 2020), "V klype Zayn pokazaly masky ukraynskogo dyzajnera Bob Basset. Vydeo" В клипе Zayn показали маски украинского дизайнера Bob Basset. Видео [In the Zayn video was shown masks by Ukrainian designer Bob Basset. Video], gordonua.com (in Russian), Kyiv: GORDON
- ""I create masks that encourage people to extend their understanding of reality and force them to look for new meanings."", metcha.com, Amsterdam: Metcha, June 26, 2020
- Augstein, Lara (March 25, 2017), Bouchain, Susanna (ed.), "Bob Basset und Balossa AW 17 – Lviv Fashion Week 2017" [Bob Basset and Balossa AW17 - Lviv Fashion Week 2017], fashionstreet-berlin.de (in German), Berlin: Fashionstreet-Berlin
- Bychek, Alina (September 15, 2018), Sokolova, Natasha (ed.), "Ctimpank i redi-mejd: Gamlet i Bob Basset prezentovali "Predmety"" Cтимпанк и реди-мейд: Гамлет и Bob Basset презентовали "Предметы" [Steampunk and ready-made: Hamlet and Bob Basset presented "Objects"], kh.vgorode.ua (in Russian), Kyiv: UMH group
- Byttebier, Nina (August 18, 2010), "Bob Basset", Vice Media Group, Brooklyn: VICE Media LLC, archived from the original on September 20, 2016
- Doctorow, Cory (December 26, 2013), Frauenfelder, Mark (ed.), "Bob Basset's brutal repression mask auctioned to benefit independent Ukrainian media outlet", Boing Boing, Brooklyn: Happy Mutants
- Foiret, Cyril (2010), "Faux semblant by Panos Yiapanis for Vogue hommes international #12", trendland.com, New York: Trendland LLC
- Gutierrez, Czar (March 2, 2018), Olaechea, Fernando Berckemeyer (ed.), "Bob Basset y la pandilla de la máscara" [Bob Basset and the Mask Gang], elcomercio.pe (in Spanish), Lima: El Comercio
- Konoshevich, Vladimir (March 30, 2020), "Bob Basset Created a DIY Mask. Here's Your Tutorial", Bird In Flight, New York: Depositphotos
- Kucyna, Marija (November 17, 2018), "Poltavciv zaproshujut' na vystavku Gamleta Zin'kivs'kogo" Полтавців запрошують на виставку Гамлета Зіньківського [Poltava residents are invited to the exhibition of Hamlet Zinkivsky], tribuna.pl.ua (in Ukrainian), Poltava: Trybuna, archived from the original on April 4, 2019
- Kuprina, Julija (December 25, 2011), Ivantsov, Oleg (ed.), "Podarochnyj nabor. Sem' novinok ukrainskogo predmetnogo dizajna" Подарочный набор. Семь новинок украинского предметного дизайна [Gift set. Seven new products of Ukrainian object design], Focus ФОКУС (in Russian), Kyiv: UMH group
- LaGambina, Gregg (April 23, 2015), Bedard, Matthew (ed.), "Elizabeth Banks", flaunt.com, Los Angeles: Flaunt Magazine, ISSN 1523-5726, LCCN sn99003276, OCLC 40711415
- Landesman, Tat'jana (February 4, 2020), Shevchuk, Elena (ed.), "Har'kovchane prilozhili ruku k novomu klipu mirovoj pop-zvezdy" Харьковчане приложили руку к новому клипу мировой поп-звезды [Kharkiv residents had a hand in the new video of the world pop-star], Vecherniy Kharkov Вечерний Харьков [Evening Kharkov] (in Russian), Kharkiv: OOO «Redakcija gazety «Vechernij Har'kov», OCLC 762014020
- Leonova, Tat'jana (October 15, 2018), "Har'kovskij hudozhnik Bob Basset: "BDSM - jeto chisto chelovecheskaja istorija" (foto)" Харьковский художник Боб Бассет: «БДСМ - это чисто человеческая история» (фото) [Kharkov artist Bob Bassett: "BDSM is a purely human story" (photo)], mykharkov.info (in Russian), Kharkiv: Novosti Har'kova
- Lucas, Carine (June 12, 2011), "Bob Basset / The Leather Face", wadmag.com, Paris: WAD Magazine, archived from the original on July 5, 2014
- Melkozerova, Veronika (August 6, 2015), Bonner, Brian (ed.), "Meet the man behind the creepy masks seen in Givenchy show", Kyiv Post, Kyiv: Businessgroup LLC
- Mitrofanova, Anastasia (May 25, 2017), Mitrofanova, Anastasia; Danko, Taras (eds.), "Bob Basset's Artworks Are Showed in Kharkiv for the First Time", kharkivobserver.com, Kharkiv: Kharkiv Observer
- Phillips, Lynn (August 19, 2009), "Don't Step On Her Toes", New York Times, New York: The New York Times Company, ISSN 1553-8095, LCCN sn00061556, OCLC 34107580
- Satenstein, Liana (February 4, 2016), Wintour, Anna (ed.), "The Made-in-Ukraine Movement Is a Fashion Revolution", Vogue, New York: Condé Nast, ISSN 0042-8000, LCCN 08036997, OCLC 1769261
- Sellar, Gord (March 21, 2014), "Asia's First Steampunk Art Exhibition", gordsellar.com, Sejong: Brutal Rice Productions
- Sokolynska, Olena (February 23, 2018), Mitrofanova, Anastasia; Danko, Taras (eds.), "Kharkiv Artists Win Hearts in Peru", kharkivobserver.com, Kharkiv: Kharkiv Observer
- Stepanenko, Vasilisa (April 2, 2020), Gokova, Evgenija; Miroshnichenko, Sergej (eds.), "Har'kovskij dizajner predlagaet sdelat' masku svoimi rukami za 5 minut" Харьковский дизайнер предлагает сделать маску своими руками за 5 минут [The Kharkov designer offers to make a mask with own hands in 5 minutes], Objektiv Объектив [Lens] (in Russian), Kharkiv: Media gruppa «Objektiv»
- Taranenko, Andriy (July 2, 2020), Musayeva, Sevgil (ed.), "Bob Basset: Koly stalo zrozumilo, shho koronavirus ne peretvorjuje ljudynu na zombi za 7 hvylyn, ja zaspokoi'vsja" Bob Basset: Коли стало зрозуміло, що коронавірус не перетворює людину на зомбі за 7 хвилин, я заспокоївся [Bob Basset: I calmed down, when it became clear that the coronavirus won't turn a person into a zombie in 7 minutes], Ukrayinska Pravda (in Ukrainian), Kyiv: Kyiv MediaHub
- Ulrichsen, Heidi (February 13, 2018), Gentili, Mark (ed.), "Curious Couture: These collectors showcase their creativity through fashion", Sudbury.com, Sault Ste. Marie: Village Media
- Varenica, Inna (October 6, 2018), Koshkina, Sonja (ed.), "Zi strahu i shkiry" Зі страху і шкіри [Made of a fear and a leather], lb.ua (in Ukrainian), Kyiv
- Vojnickij, Andrej (August 16, 2016), "Bob Basset: Objedinenie mira proizojdet pri nashej zhizni i potugi tiranchikov stanut bessmyslennymi" Боб Бассет: Объединение мира произойдет при нашей жизни и потуги тиранчиков станут бессмысленными [Bob Basset: The unification of the world will happen in our lifetime, and the attempts of tyrants will become meaningless], mykharkov.info (in Russian), Kharkiv: Novosti Har'kova
