= Dirty Little Rabbits discography =

- Studio albums: 1
- Extended plays: 2

Dirty Little Rabbits is an American alternative rock band formed in 2007. The band currently consists of two Extended plays (EPs), neither of which have ever charted. These figures do not account for material released by members' side projects.

The band's first EP, Breeding, was released on August 15, 2007. It released exclusively through the New York-based record shop Looney Tunes. The album was independently produced and was recorded at Are Studios in Omaha, Nebraska. It last eleven minutes and consists of 3 tracks.

Dirty Little Rabbits released their second EP, Simon, through The End Records. The EP was recorded and produced at the Sound Farm Studio & Recording Environment in Jamaica, Iowa and was scheduled for release on January 20, 2009, however, the release was delayed and was released on January 27, 2009. Simon is much more available to the public domain than Breeding is.

Dirty Little Rabbits is the debut album by American indie band Dirty Little Rabbits released on July 6, 2010.

== Albums ==
2010	Dirty Little Rabbits: Released: July 6, 2010; Label: The End Records; Format: CD

== Extended plays ==
2007	Breeding: Released: August 15, 2007; Label: Sopra Evil Records; Format: CD
2009	Simon: Released: January 27, 2009; Label: The End Records; Format: CD
