= Michael Pfaff =

American percussionist (born 1980)

- Also known as: Tortilla Man
- Born: May 17, 1980 (age 46)
- Genres: Nu metal; groove metal; alternative metal; alternative rock
- Occupation: Musician
- Instruments: Percussion; keyboards
- Years active: 2007–present
- Member of: Slipknot
- Formerly of: Dirty Little Rabbits

Michael Pfaff (born May 17, 1980), also known as Tortilla Man, is an American musician, best known as one of the two current percussionists of heavy metal band Slipknot. He was also a member of the alternative rock band Dirty Little Rabbits as their keyboardist with Slipknot bandmate Shawn Crahan.

== Career ==
=== Dirty Little Rabbits ===
Pfaff has been a lifelong friend of Slipknot bandmate Sid Wilson, who introduced him to Shawn Crahan in 2007. The two quickly hit it off where they formed a band together called Dirty Little Rabbits where he was the band's pianist. The band released two extended play's Breeding (2007) and Simon (2009) before releasing their debut and only eponymous album in 2010, before splitting up in 2012.

=== Slipknot ===
Following the dismissal of longtime Slipknot percussionist and backup vocalist Chris Fehn in March 2019 due to him filing a lawsuit against the band, Pfaff was quickly contacted by Crahan while working on his day job about potentially replacing Fehn, to which he accepted. He took over percussion duties, joining the band shortly before the filming of the music video for "Unsainted", the lead single off of their sixth studio album We Are Not Your Kind, released on August 9, 2019. Due to the appearance of his mask resembling a tortilla, Pfaff was quickly nicknamed "Tortilla Man" by fans and was known primarily by this title until the band finally revealed his identity in March 2022. Initially brought in as a touring member, Pfaff became an official full-time member of the band when the band and himself returned to the studio to record the seventh studio album The End, So Far. Pfaff sustained an ankle injury while performing on the band's 2022 European Tour.

== Personal life ==
Pfaff attended New England Conservatory of Music in Boston, Massachusetts and received a master's degree in music. He attended Lawrence University, in Appleton, Wisconsin, for his undergraduate degree, also in music. He also has a wife, and they have one child together.

== Discography ==
=== Slipknot ===
- The End, So Far (2022)

=== Dirty Little Rabbits ===
- Breeding (2007)
- Simon (2009)
- Dirty Little Rabbits (2010)
