= Vanity label =

Subsidiary record label

Informally, a vanity label (compare vanity press) is a record label founded as a wholly or partially owned subsidiary of another, larger, and better established (at least at the time of the vanity label's founding) record label, where the subsidiary is (at least nominally) controlled by a successful recording artist, designed to allow this artist to release music by other artists they admire.

The parent label handles the production and distribution and funding of the vanity label, but the album is usually released with the vanity brand name prominent. Usually, the artist/head of the vanity label is signed to the parent label, and this artist's own recordings will be released under the vanity brand name.

Creating a vanity label can be an attractive idea for the parent label, primarily as a "perk" to keep a successful artist on the label's roster happy and as a venue to bring fellow artists to the public's attention.

== Prominent vanity labels ==
Vanity Label	Founding Artist	Founded	Notable Artists Released	Parent Label (at founding)	Status
Reprise Records	Frank Sinatra	1960	List of Reprise Records artists	Independent	Purchased by Warner Bros. Records in 1963; shuttered in 1976, but relaunched in 1987 and active since then.
Brother Records	The Beach Boys	1966	The Beach Boys; Brian Wilson & Mike Love; The Flames; Stephen Kalinich	Capitol Records	active
Bizarre Records	Frank Zappa	1967	The Mothers of Invention; Alice Cooper	Metro-Goldwyn-Mayer, under the Verve brand	re-issued on Reprise Records
Apple Records	The Beatles	1968	The Beatles; John Lennon; Paul McCartney/Wings; George Harrison; Ringo Starr; Badfinger; Mary Hopkin; Yoko Ono; David Peel; Ravi Shankar; John Tavener; James Taylor	EMI, under Parlophone in the UK and Capitol Records in the US	active; revived in 1989 for Beatles recordings. See also Apple Corps
Threshold Records	The Moody Blues	1969	The Moody Blues; Blue Jays; The Graeme Edge Band	London Records (now Decca Records)	—
Kling Klang	Kraftwerk	1970	Kraftwerk	EMI Warner Music	active
Grunt Records	Jefferson Airplane	1971	Jefferson Airplane, Jefferson Starship, Starship	RCA Records	defunct after 1987
Rolling Stones Records	Rolling Stones	1971	Rolling Stones; Peter Tosh	Atlantic Records (WEA) (now Warner Music Group)	albums now released by Universal Music Group
The Rocket Record Company	Elton John	1973	Elton John; Kiki Dee; Cliff Richard; Stackridge; Neil Sedaka	Various, including Island Records (UK; 1973-1978) and MCA Records (US; 1973-1978)	inactive
Manticore Records	Emerson, Lake and Palmer	1973	Emerson, Lake and Palmer; Greg Lake; John Greaves	Atlantic Records, 1973-1975; Motown Records, 1976-1977	closed (1977), relaunched (2017)
Swan Song Records	Led Zeppelin	1974	Led Zeppelin; Bad Company; Dave Edmunds	Atlantic Records (WEA) (now Warner Music Group)	closed (1983)
ARC (American Recording Company)	Earth, Wind and Fire	1978	Earth, Wind and Fire; Deniece Williams; The Emotions	Columbia Records	inactive
Modern Records	Stevie Nicks	1980	Stevie Nicks; Rick Vito; Natalie Cole	Atlantic Records (WEA) (now Warner Music Group)	closed (1999)
Qwest Records	Quincy Jones	1980	Joy Division/New Order (in the US); Frank Sinatra; George Benson	A&M Records; Warner Bros. Records	active (2007)
Duck Records	Eric Clapton	1983	Eric Clapton	Reprise Records (WEA) (now Warner Music Group)	active
Es Paranza Records	Robert Plant	1983	Robert Plant	Atlantic Records (WEA) (now Warner Music Group)	—
Respond Records	Paul Weller	1983	Tracie Young; The Questions; A Craze; Vaughn Toulouse	Polydor Records	closed (1986)
Paisley Park Records	Prince	1986	Prince; Sheila E. George Clinton	Warner Bros. Records (WEA) (now Warner Music Group)	closed (1994)
UZI Suicide	Guns N' Roses	1987	Guns N' Roses; Hanoi Rocks	Geffen	inactive; owned by Geffen
Death Row Records	Dr. Dre; Suge Knight	1992	Dr. Dre; Snoop Dogg; 2Pac; Tha Dogg Pound; Nate Dogg; The Lady of Rage; Crooked I Danny Boy	Interscope Records; Priority Records	original defunct in 2008; revived by Snoop Dogg since 2022
Maverick Records	Madonna	1992	Madonna; Alanis Morissette; Deftones; The Prodigy (in the US); Michelle Branch; Mest; Story of the Year; The Rentals; Tantric; Meshell Ndegeocello; Candlebox; Erasure	Warner Bros. Records; Sire Records; Reprise Records	inactive (managed by Warner Bros. Records since 2006)
Nothing Records	Trent Reznor	1992	Nine Inch Nails; Marilyn Manson; Meat Beat Manifesto; 12 Rounds; Pop Will Eat Itself; The The	Interscope Records originally distributed by Atlantic Records (WEA) (now Warner Music Group) then Universal Music Group	defunct as of 2004. Reznor has now formed a similar label, The Null Corporation
Grand Royal	Beastie Boys	1992	Beastie Boys; Bis; At the Drive-In; Jimmy Eat World; Atari Teenage Riot; Sean Lennon; Luscious Jackson; Bran Van 3000	Capitol Records	dissolved in 2001. Back catalogue distributed by GR2 Records, created when a group of fans purchased Grand Royal's assets.
Total Vegas Recordings	Terrorvision	1992	Terrorvision	EMI Records	
Pearl Records	Garth Brooks	1992	Garth Brooks	Liberty Records/Capitol Records under EMI (1992 - 2005); RCA Records (2005 - 2016); Independent (2016–present)	inactive; partnership with Liberty/Capitol/EMI ended in 2005, and partnership with RCA ended in 2016. Now an independent label.
Discipline Global Mobile	Robert Fripp	1992	Robert Fripp; King Crimson; The ProjeKcts; Fripp & Eno; David Sylvian & Robert Fripp; Adrian Belew; BPM&M; Bill Bruford; Bruford Levin Upper Extremities; California Guitar Trio; Europa String Choir; Trey Gunn; Peter Hammill; John Paul Jones; Tony Levin; Bill Nelson	E.G. Records/Virgin Records (1992-2002); Sanctuary Records (2002-2007); Independent (2007–present)	active
Peak Records	Russ Freeman	1994	David Benoit; Eric Marienthal; The Rippingtons; Russ Freeman	Concord Music Group	active (2007)
Gotee Records	TobyMac	1994	Out of Eden; Family Force 5 House of Heroes; Deepspace5	EMI Christian Music Group	inactive
Moonfog Productions	Satyricon	1994	Darkthrone, Satyricon, DHG, Khold	Tatra Records	active (2009)
SYUN	Susumu Hirasawa	1994	Syun; P-MODEL; Phnonpenh MODEL; Pre P-MODEL; Tadahiko Yokogawa; Shifukudan; Fukō Project; PEVO; Teruo Nakano	DIW	inactive since 1996
Never Broke Again	NBA Youngboy			Cash Money Records	active (2022)
Roswell Records	Dave Grohl	1995	Foo Fighters; Probot	originally Capitol Records, then RCA Records (Foo Fighters); Southern Lord Records (Probot)	active (2012)
Palace Records	Will Oldham	1996	Bonnie 'Prince' Billy; Will Oldham; Papa M Matt Sweeney	Drag City	active (2007)
TESLAKITE	Susumu Hirasawa	1996	Susumu Hirasawa; P-MODEL; Wataru Kamiryo; KAKU P-MODEL; Mandrake; Susumu Hirasawa + InhVmaN	Nippon Columbia (1996-1998); MAGNET Records (1999); Chaos Union (2000–present)	active (2012)
Melankolic Records	Massive Attack	1996	Alpha; Horace Andy; Craig Armstrong; Day One; Lewis Parker; Sunna	Virgin Records	active (2007)
Aftermath Entertainment	Dr. Dre	1996	Eminem; Game; 50 Cent; Cashis; Busta Rhymes; Slim da Mobster; Hayes; Kendrick Lamar	Universal Music Group under Interscope Records	active (2008)
Vapor Records	Neil Young	1996	Neil Young; Jonathan Richman; Tegan and Sara; Los Abandoned; Spoon; Acetone	originally Sanctuary Records, then Universal Music	active (2007)
Hellcat Records	Tim Armstrong	1997	Rancid; Joe Strummer & The Mescaleros; Transplants; The Slackers; Dropkick Murphys; The Distillers	Epitaph Records	active (2007)
Adeline Records	Billie Joe Armstrong	1997	Green Day; AFI; The Living End; Jesse Malin	Warner Music Group	active (2007)
Elementree Records	Korn	1997	Videodrone; Orgy; Deadsy	Epic Records	dissolved after Korn's departure from Epic
ATO Records	Dave Matthews	1997	Ben Kweller; David Gray; My Morning Jacket; Crowded House; Gov't Mule; Gomez	Sony BMG	active (2007)
Mötley Records	Mötley Crüe	1997	Mötley Crüe	Hip-O Records (former), Warner Music Group (current)	active
Tool Dissectional	Tool	1999	Tool	Volcano Entertainment/Zomba	active
Way Moby	"Weird Al" Yankovic	1999	"Weird Al" Yankovic	Volcano Entertainment/Zomba	active
E Works	Eels	2000	Eels	DreamWorks	active
Big Brother Recordings	Oasis	2000	Oasis; Happy Mondays	Sony BMG	active
Honest Jon's	Damon Albarn	2000	The Good, the Bad & the Queen; The Ailerons; Blur	Parlophone	active (2007)
Shady Records	Eminem	2000	Eminem; D12; Obie Trice; 50 Cent; Cashis; Slim da Mobster; Slaughterhouse; Yelawolf	Universal Music Group	active
Flawless Records	Fred Durst	2000	Puddle of Mudd; She Wants Revenge; Big Dumb Face	Universal Music Group under Geffen Records	active (2007)
Serjical Strike Records	Serj Tankian	2001	Axis of Justice; Bad Acid Trip; Buckethead; Death by Stereo; Fair to Midland; Kittens for Christian; Serart; Serj Tankian	Universal Music Group under The Universal Motown/Universal Republic Group	active (2009)
UTP Records	Juvenile	2001	Juvenile; Young Buck (until 2002); 2 Pistols; Partners-N-Crime	Warner Music Group	active
1st & 15th Entertainment	Lupe Fiasco	2001	Lupe Fiasco; Sarah Green; Pooh Bear a.k.a. MDMA	Warner Music Group under Atlantic Records	active (2012)
US Records	Usher	2002	One Chance; Rico Love; Ryon Lovett; Justin Bieber	J Records	active (2007)
Brushfire Records	Jack Johnson	2002	Jack Johnson; Matt Costa; G. Love & Special Sauce; Rogue Wave; Animal Liberation Orchestra	Universal Music Group under Universal Republic	active (2007)
Grand Hustle Records	T.I.	2003	T.I. Young Dro; B.o.B; DJ Drama; Big Kuntry King; Iggy Azalea; 8Ball & MJG	Warner Music Group under Atlantic Records	active (2010)
Jaded Records	Jay Sean	2003	Jay Sean	Universal Music Group under Cash Money Records	active
Attack Records	Morrissey	2003	Morrissey; Nancy Sinatra; Damien Dempsey; Jobriath; James Maker; Kristeen Young; Remma	Sanctuary Records	active (2005)
G.O.O.D. Music	Kanye West	2004	Common; Kid Cudi; Pusha T Cyhi Tha Prynce; Big Sean; Mr Hudson; John Legend; Mos Def; Consequence	Sony Music Entertainment and Atlantic Recording Corporation (2005-2011); Universal Music Group under Def Jam Recordings (2011–present)	active (since 2005)
Machine Shop Records	Mike Shinoda and Brad Delson of Linkin Park	2004	Linkin Park; Fort Minor; Skylar Grey; Alexa Ray Joel; Army of Anyone	Warner Bros. Records	active (2012)
Heiress Records	Paris Hilton	2004	Paris Hilton	Warner Bros. Records	inactive
DC Flag Records	Joel and Benji Madden of Good Charlotte	2004	Hazen Street; Lola Ray; MC Chris	Epic Records	active
Knockout Entertainment	Ray J	2005	Ray J Brandy; Shorty Mack; Willie Norwood; Michael Copon; TKO	E1 Music	active (2008)
Konichiwa Records	Robyn	2005	Robyn; Zhala	Universal Music Group	active
Decaydance Records	Pete Wentz	2005	Fall Out Boy; Gym Class Heroes; Four Year Strong; Panic! at the Disco; The Academy Is... Cobra Starship; Lifetime; The Cab; The Hush Sound	Warner Music Group under Fueled By Ramen	active (2009)
Axtone Records	Axwell	2005	Axwell; Thomas Gold; Hard Rock Sofa; NEW_ID	Universal Music Group	active
Big Orange Clown Records	Shawn Crahan	2005	Gizmachi	Sanctuary Records	active (2008)
Raybaw Records	Big & Rich	2005	James Otto; Cowboy Troy	Warner Bros. Nashville	dissolved in 2008
Liberty & Lament Records	Lucero	2005	Lucero	Warner Bros.	active (2007)
Young Money Entertainment	Lil Wayne; Mack Maine	2005	Lil Wayne; Nicki Minaj; Drake; Mack Maine; Tyga; Gudda Gudda; Jae Millz; Christina Milian; Lil Chuckee; Lil Twist; T Streets; Short Dawg; Cory Gunz; Shanell aka SnL; Porcelain Black	Cash Money Records	active
Helium-3	Muse	2006	Muse	Warner Bros.	active (2007)
Born & Bred Records	Dropkick Murphys	2007	Dropkick Murphys	Warner Bros.	active (2007)
Ragged Flag	The Prodigy	2007	The Prodigy	Cooking Vinyl	inactive
Sergeant Records	Douglas Vale	2007	Douglas Vale; Tyler Hilton; Kejsi Tola; Sunrise Avenue; Macklemore; Pharoahe Monch	Warner Music Group	active (since 2008)
Tennman Records	Justin Timberlake	2007	Esmée Denters	Interscope Records	active (since 2007)
RBMG	Usher	2008	Justin Bieber	Island Def Jam Music Group	active (2013)
1017 Brick Squad	Gucci Mane	2008	Waka Flocka Flame; OJ Da Juiceman; Frenchie; Wooh Da Kid; Slim Dunkin	Warner Bros.	active (2009)
Average Joes Entertainment	Colt Ford	2008	Colt Ford; Montgomery Gentry; Bubba Sparxxx	Average Joe's Entertainment Group, LLC	active
Take Me to the Hospital	The Prodigy	2008	The Prodigy	Cooking Vinyl	active
Tass Radio Records	T-Beats and Unkgeta	2008	T-Beats; Unkgeta; AmphetamineThaEmcee	Universal Music Group under Interscope Records	active
N.E.E.T. Recordings	M.I.A.	2008	Nguzunguzu; Sleigh Bells; Rye Rye	XL Recordings, Interscope Records	inactive, founding artist now signed to Interscope
Search & Destroy	Fightstar	2009	Fightstar	Gut Records	active (2009)
Roc Nation	Jay-Z	2009	Jay-Z; J. Cole; Wale; Grimes; Meek Mill; Jay Electronica; Rita Ora; Normani; Rihanna; Shakira; The-Dream; Jaden	Sony Music Entertainment/Atlantic Recording Corporation	active (since 2009); partnership with Sony/Atlantic ended in 2013, currently in partnership with Universal Music and owned by Live Nation.
Hell, etc.	Marilyn Manson	2010	Marilyn Manson	Cooking Vinyl	—
Juonbu Records	Babymetal	2010	Babymetal	Toy's Factory	inactive; replaced by BMD Fox Records in 2013 when Babymetal graduated from Sakura Gakuin and was launched as a standalone unit.
Ticker Tape	Radiohead	2011	Radiohead	XL Recordings	active
Blackened Recordings	Metallica	2012	Metallica	Rhino Entertainment (North America), Universal Music (worldwide)	active
K-BAHN	Backstreet Boys	2013	Backstreet Boys	BMG Rights Management, RED Music	active
BMD Fox Records	Babymetal	2013	Babymetal	Toy's Factory	active; preceded by 重音部 Records.
Unsub Records	Katy Perry	2014	Ferras; Cyn	Capitol Records	active
Nash Icon Music	Scott Borchetta	2014	Reba McEntire; Ronnie Dunn; Martina McBride	Big Machine Records	inactive
REMember music	Mac Miller	2014	Mac Miller; Njomza; Choo Jackson; Dylan Reynolds; Hardo; Primavera Vills; The Come Up	Warner Music Group	active

== See also ==
- Independent record label
- Lists of record labels
- List of largest music deals
- Music industry
- Music recording sales certification
