= Birth of the Cruel =

2019 single by Slipknot

Single by Slipknot

from the album We Are Not Your Kind
- Released: August 5, 2019
- Length: 4:36
- Label: Roadrunner
- Songwriters: Shawn Crahan; Jim Root; Corey Taylor
- Producers: Greg Fidelman; Slipknot

Slipknot singles chronology
"Solway Firth" (2019)	"Birth of the Cruel" (2019)	"Nero Forte" (2019)

Music video
- "Birth of the Cruel" on YouTube

"Birth of the Cruel" is a song by American heavy metal band Slipknot. Produced by Greg Fidelman and the band, it was released on August 5, 2019, as the third single from the band's sixth studio album, We Are Not Your Kind (2019).

== Background ==
"Birth of the Cruel" was released on August 5, 2019, as the band's third single off their sixth studio album, We Are Not Your Kind, following after the release of "Solway Firth" the previous month. It would be the last single to be released prior to the album's release and was debuted on Zane Lowe's 'World Record' segment on his Beats 1 radio show on Apple Music.

The title is a play on Birth of the Cool, a 1957 compilation album by jazz trumpeter Miles Davis.

== Critical reception ==
The reception was generally positive for "Birth of the Cruel". Reviewing the song for Metal Hammer, Merlin Alderslade described it as "a stomping, menacing, groove-heavy killer out of the Robb Flynn songbook", which to him sounded more "brooding" and "sinister" than previous singles "Unsainted" and "Solway Firth". Corey Taylor's vocals were described as "a maniacal conductor whom is at the head of the world's most demented symphony". Jordan Bassett of NME had something similar to say, and did so by breaking down the ominous lyrics to summarize the song. "A drone-like verse gives way to a claustrophobic and taut refrain whose lyrics – "We are the bitter, the maladjusted" – suggests that Slipknot 2019 has much in common with Slipknot 1999".

During an interview between Corey Taylor with Zane Lowe on his Beats 1 Radio Show, Lowe would comment on "Birth of the Cruel", mentioning how the song reminded him of Alice in Chains. In response, Taylor would state the following: "Absolutely. It's dark, man. It’s real, but it still pulls you in and just, it's that lurch."

== Charts ==
Chart performance for "Birth of the Cruel"
Chart (2019)	Peak position
UK Rock & Metal (OCC)	9
US Hot Rock & Alternative Songs (Billboard)	14
