= Solway Firth (song) =

Single by Slipknot

from the album We Are Not Your Kind
- Released: July 22, 2019
- Studio: EastWest (Hollywood)
- Genre: Melodic death metal; thrash metal
- Length: 5:56
- Label: Roadrunner
- Songwriters: Shawn Crahan; Jim Root; Corey Taylor
- Producers: Greg Fidelman; Slipknot

Slipknot singles chronology
"Unsainted" (2019)	"Solway Firth" (2019)	"Birth of the Cruel" (2019)

Music video
- "Solway Firth" on YouTube

"Solway Firth" is a song by American heavy metal band Slipknot. Produced by Greg Fidelman, it was released on July 22, 2019, as the second single from their sixth album, We Are Not Your Kind. The song's music video was directed by the band's percussionist Shawn "Clown" Crahan and features footage from the Amazon Prime Video series The Boys. The track peaked at number 8 on the US Billboard Hot Rock Songs chart and number 14 on the UK Rock & Metal Singles Chart.

== Background ==
"Solway Firth" was released on July 22, 2019, as the second single from the band's sixth studio album, We Are Not Your Kind, following "Unsainted" two months previously. The song's title refers to Solway Firth, a section of sea which forms part of the border between Scotland and England, but may also be alluding to the Solway Firth Spaceman, a popular subject of ufology; the recurring lyric "Here's an unexplainable one" is a likely allusion to this.

== Reception ==
Media response to "Solway Firth" was generally positive. Reviewing the song for Metal Hammer, Adam Rees claimed that it was "an altogether different assault" from "All Out Life" and "Unsainted", describing the track as "dramatic, a little troubling and downright heavy". Similarly, Kerrang! magazine called it "a six-minute masterpiece". Loudwire's Lauryn Schaffner praised the performances of vocalist Corey Taylor and drummer Jay Weinberg on the track, outlining that "Corey Taylor's vocals [shine] through with brutal intensity [... and] Jay Weinberg's drumming also stands out as a high point, crushing extended double kick patterns throughout the cut." Several commentators have recognized "Solway Firth" as one of the "heavy" and "experimental" tracks promised by the band on We Are Not Your Kind – Nick Reilly of the NME claimed that the song "borders on Iowa levels of heavy", referring to a description made by Taylor, while Kerrang! also quoted Taylor when claiming that the single "boast[s] the 'experimental' side of the band's sound".

== Music video ==
The music video features footage from Slipknot's summer 2019 European shows (including Download Festival) interspersed with clips from the Amazon Prime Video series The Boys. It was co-produced by Uproxx and Prime Video, with the band's percussionist and frequent director Shawn "Clown" Crahan directing. Ryan Reed of Rolling Stone outlined that the "gruesome" video "alternates head-banging live performance footage with violent clips from" the series, highlighting "Bloody scenes [including] a man holding two severed arms and one character bashing someone's head into a bathroom sink."

== Charts ==
=== Weekly charts ===
Weekly chart performance for "Solway Firth"
Chart (2019)	Peak position
Canada Digital Songs (Billboard)	48
France (SNEP Sales Chart)	146
Hungary (Single Top 40)	9
New Zealand Hot Singles (RMNZ)	18
Scotland Singles (OCC)	53
UK Singles Sales (OCC)	61
UK Singles Downloads (OCC)	60
UK Rock & Metal (OCC)	14
US Digital Song Sales (Billboard)	45
US Hot Rock & Alternative Songs (Billboard)	8

=== Year-end charts ===
Year-end chart performance for "Solway Firth"
Chart (2019)	Position
US Hot Rock & Alternative Songs (Billboard)	97
