= Prismism =

Studio album by Keuning
- Released: January 25, 2019
- Recorded: 2018
- Studios: Dave Keuning's Home Studio, San Diego, California; Cardiff Giant Studios; Sonic Factory Studios, Des Moines, IA
- Length: 49:07
- Label: Pretty Faithful
- Producer: Brandon Darner

Keuning chronology
Prismism (2019)	A Mild Case of Everything (2021)

Singles from Prismism
- 1. "Restless Legs" Released: October 12, 2018; 2. "Prismism" Released: November 2, 2018; 3. "Boat Accident" Released: November 30, 2018; 4. "The Queen's Finest" Released: January 11, 2019

Prismism is the debut studio album by Keuning, the solo project of the Killers guitarist Dave Keuning. It was released through his label Pretty Faithful on January 25, 2019. "Restless Legs" was the first single, released on October 12, 2018.

== Background ==
Dave Keuning announced the release of his debut solo album Prismism in October 2018, becoming the last member of the Killers to release a solo or side project. After stepping down from touring with the Killers in August 2017, Keuning began working on song ideas that he had amassed over the past decade, some of which had been pitched to the Killers but ultimately not used by the band. He told Billboard "I didn't drop out of the Killers just to do this (album); It was just going to be too long of a tour for me, but it was nevertheless very refreshing and just felt free and I think I needed this. I don't think I've had this much fun making music in a long, long, long time." He recorded the album at his home in San Diego with producer Brandon Darner, playing most of the instruments himself with contributions on drums from John JR Robinson and Seth Luloff.

== Track listing ==
All tracks produced by Brandon Darner

All tracks are written by Dave Keuning (except noted).

No.	Title	Writer(s)	Length
1.	"Boat Accident"		4:05
2.	"The Night"	Keuning, Alfred Howard	2:44
3.	"The Queen's Finest"	Keuning, Brandon Darner, Micah Natera	3:29
4.	"I Ruined You"		3:50
5.	"Ruptured"		3:19
6.	"If You Say So"	Keuning, Howard	3:17
7.	"Prismism"		5:01
8.	"Restless Legs"		3:04
9.	"Pretty Faithful"		3:39
10.	"High Places"		3:46
11.	"Broken Clocks"		3:16
12.	"Gimme Your Heart"		2:11
13.	"Stuck Here On Earth"	Keuning, Mike Thomson, Ross Vander Werf	4:42
14.	"Hope and Safety"		2:44
Total length:			49:07

Adapted from iTunes.

== Personnel ==
Adapted from liner notes.

=== Musicians ===
- Dave Keuning – bass, keyboards, electronic drums, vocals, guitar
- Brandon Darner – backing vocals (1), acoustic guitar and additional keyboards (3)
- Micah Natera – backing vocals (1), additional keyboards (2, 7), additional guitar (8)
- Homer Rodeheaver – additional vocals (12)
- Ross Vanderwerf – backing vocals (13)
- Mark Stoermer – additional keyboards (9)
- Luke Pettipoole – bass (6)
- Seth Luloff – drums (1, 3, 4, 6, 9, 11), additional programming (4)
- John "J.R." Robinson – drums (2)

=== Production ===
- Brandon Darner – producer
- Micah Natera – engineer, mixer
- Brian B. William – art direction
- Andrew Brightman – A&R
- Fetzer Design – design
- Austin Burns – additional engineer
- James Page – additional engineer
- Robert Root – additional engineer (9)
- Patrick Haney – additional engineer (10, 13)
- Phillip Liddiard – additional engineer (13)
- Doug Van Sloun – mastering at Focus Mastering
- Dana Trippe – photography
- Sergey Kolivayko – additional photography

== Critical reception ==
Professional ratings
Review scores
Source	Rating
The Irish News	3/5 stars
Louder Than War	3.5/5 stars
Musik Express	2/5 stars
NME	4/5 stars
Uncut	3.5/5 stars

The album has received several positive reviews with NME describing the record as "vibrant and accomplished", Louder than War called it a "fine record" that "deserves your time."
