= Amsterdam (Imagine Dragons song) =

Promotional single by Imagine Dragons

from the album Night Visions and the EP It's Time
- Released: September 4, 2012
- Recorded: December 2010
- Studio: Studio at the Palms, Paradise, Nevada, U.S.
- Genre: Alternative rock
- Length: 4:01
- Label: KIDinaKORNER; Interscope
- Songwriters: Ben McKee; Dan Reynolds; Wayne Sermon
- Producers: Ben McKee; Dan Platzman; Dan Reynolds; Wayne Sermon; Alexander Grant; Brandon Darner

Imagine Dragons promotional singles chronology
"Amsterdam" (2012)	"Round and Round" (2012)

"Amsterdam" is a song written and recorded by American rock band Imagine Dragons, for their third self-released extended play, It's Time. It appears as the second track on the EP. The song was later reproduced and remastered for inclusion on their debut album Night Visions and appears as the sixth track on the album.

== Composition ==
The song, originally featured on the band's It's Time EP released in March 2011, was one of the earliest Imagine Dragons songs to incorporate electronic music into their traditional rock band set-up evident in their earlier works. The song, along with most of the It's Time EP, used electronic music to create the timbre and texture of the song rather than forming the melodies and riffs of the song. A similar concept was first used by the band for "Hear Me", a song off their 2010 extended play Hell and Silence.

== Release ==
"Amsterdam" was first released officially on December 31, 2010, through a music video posted on their YouTube channel. It was exclusively released as a free download via iTunes for a limited time. The song was released as iTunes' "Single of the Week" on the week of the album's release in countries with respective release dates of the album. The single was first released in North America on the American September 4, 2012 release date, and again in European countries on the European February 7, 2013 release date of the album.

== Live performances ==
"Amsterdam" is one of the band's most played songs, being played at an excess of over 300 concerts since its first play on August 6, 2010. The song was also a regular on the setlist of the band's Night Visions tour, on which they embarked in 2013. The song was usually played after the setlist opener "Round and Round".

== Track listing ==
Digital download
No.	Title	Length
1.	"Amsterdam"	4:01

== Personnel ==
Adapted from Night Visions liner notes.

Imagine Dragons

- Ben McKee – bass
- Dan Reynolds – lead vocals
- Wayne Sermon – guitar
- Andrew Tolman – drums
- Brittany Tolman – backing vocals, keyboard

Additional personnel

- Brandon Darner – co-producer
- Mark Everton Gray – recording
- Mark Needham – mixing
- Will Brierre – engineer
- Joe LaPorta – mastering

== Charts ==
Chart (2013–14)	Peak position
Belgium (Ultratip Bubbling Under Flanders)	18
Canada Rock (Billboard)	45
US Hot Rock Songs (Billboard)	48

== Certifications ==
Region	Certification	Certified units/sales
United States (RIAA)	Platinum	1,000,000^{‡}
^{‡} Sales+streaming figures based on certification alone.

== Release history ==
Country	Date	Format	Label
Canada	September 4, 2012	Digital download	Interscope Records
United States	September 4, 2012	Digital download	Interscope Records
Belgium	February 7, 2013	Digital download	Interscope Records
France	February 7, 2013	Digital download	Interscope Records
Germany	February 7, 2013	Digital download	Interscope Records
Netherlands	February 7, 2013	Digital download	Interscope Records
Ireland	April 6, 2013	Digital download	Interscope Records
United Kingdom	April 6, 2013	Digital download	Interscope Records
