= Nero Forte =

2019 single by Slipknot

Single by Slipknot

from the album We Are Not Your Kind
- Released: December 16, 2019
- Genre: Rap metal, nu metal
- Length: 5:15
- Label: Roadrunner
- Songwriters: Shawn Crahan; Jim Root; Corey Taylor
- Producers: Greg Fidelman; Slipknot

Slipknot singles chronology
"Birth of the Cruel" (2019)	"Nero Forte" (2019)	"The Chapeltown Rag" (2021)

Music video
- "Nero Forte" on YouTube

"Nero Forte" is a song by American heavy metal band Slipknot. Produced by Greg Fidelman and the band, it was released as the fourth single from the band's sixth studio album We Are Not Your Kind on December 16, 2019.

== Background ==
"Nero Forte" was released on December 16, 2019, as the band's fourth single off their sixth studio album We Are Not Your Kind, following after the release of "Birth of the Cruel" four months previously. The song's title "Nero" and "Forte" are Italian words that mean "black" and "strong" respectively. "Forte" can also mean something in which one excels.

== Recording and meaning ==
Though the song title does not appear in the lyrics, it describes the darkness that Taylor sunk into. The depression was like an entity that he did not feel he had the strength to fight against. When talking about the song, guitarist Jim Root stated: "This is also a Clown song, which is amazing. This one is going to be great live. It's very percussive and reminiscent of "Psychosocial", but maybe an evolution of "Psychosocial". Obviously, Clown is a drummer and percussionist, but he's also a songwriter—and he always has been. Now we're able to collaborate as songwriters, and this is what we end up with. When Corey came in and started diving into the vocals, he came up with this extra melody in the chorus line, very late into the process. That really drew me into this song."

== Music video ==
Shawn Crahan, Slipknot's percussionist and founder, directed the video along with a 20 minute short film titled Pollution, which would be released on the same day as the "Nero Forte". They were both recorded within two days, October 29 and 30. They were both initially to be released at some point during November, but for some reasons they did not come into fruition until a later date.

The "Nero Forte" music video stars the band, who jam out and perform in a white limbo, constantly flashed by coloured beaming lights, at points surrounding what seems to be a fan inside of a cocoon, which has something inside which appears to try to be trying to escape and be reborn.

== Charts ==
Chart performance for "Nero Forte"
Chart (2019)	Peak position
Finland (Suomen virallinen lista)	67
New Zealand Hot Singles (RMNZ)	16
UK Singles (Official Charts)	84
UK Rock & Metal (Official Charts)	4
US Hot Rock & Alternative Songs (Billboard)	11

== Certifications ==
Certifications for "Nero Forte"
Region	Certification	Certified units/sales
Canada (Music Canada)	Gold	40,000^{‡}
United Kingdom (BPI)	Silver	200,000^{‡}
^{‡} Sales+streaming figures based on certification alone.
