= Stella Soleil =

Greek-American pop and rock singer (born 1971)

- Also known as: Sister Soleil
- Born: Stella G. Katsoudas; November 3, 1971 (age 54)
- Origin: Chicago, Illinois, U.S.
- Genres: Pop, rock, dance
- Occupation: Singer
- Years active: 1996–present
- Label: Universal
- Website: stellasoleilofficial.com

Stella Katsoudas (born November 3, 1971) is a Greek-American pop and rock singer better known for stage names Stella Soleil and Sister Soleil as well as having been frontwoman for Dirty Little Rabbits. Katsoudas most recently released the 2015 album Under a DubWitch Moon under the moniker DubWitch.

== Biography ==
=== 1997-2001: Universal Records ===
To gain inspiration for her next album, Stella took a two-year trek around the world, during which she read, wrote in journals, and practiced yoga while recording in five countries. "I spent two years by myself," she said. "[The label] was really supportive that I needed to go across the Atlantic to reinvent myself and to find my voice and my writing muse."

The first single released was "Kiss Kiss", the English version of "Şımarık" originally sung by Turkish star Tarkan. The song's popularity spread after first being played on Y-100, a South Floridian radio station. "Kiss Kiss" was one of Stella's biggest hits reaching #27 on the Billboard Top 40 charts in the US.

On May 1, 2001, Stella released her 2nd album Dirty Little Secret. Despite the success of 'Kiss Kiss' the album barely charted at #106 on Billboard though it did reach #2 on the Heatseekers chart.

=== DubWitch ===
In early 2015 Katsoudas self-released music under a new project entitled DubWitch with the release of "Under A DubWitch Moon". DubWitch is officially described as "dub step inspired, hip hop beats, ethereal vocals, down tempo, electronic music. creepy and cool."

== Discography ==
=== Albums ===
- Drown Me in You (EP released under the name Sister Soleil)
- Soularium (released under the name Sister Soleil)
- Dirty Little Secret (released under 'Stella Soleil' in 2001)
- Breeding (EP released with Dirty Little Rabbits in 2007)
- Simon (Second EP released with Dirty Little Rabbits in 2009)
- Dirty Little Rabbits (Debut album with Dirty Little Rabbits in 2010)
- Eskimo (2011)
- Under A DubWitch Moon (Released under the name DubWitch 2015)

=== Singles ===
- "Hello" as Stella Soleil, (2025)
- "Save Your Life" as Stella Soleil, (2020)
- "Torch" as Sister Soleil
- "Kiss Kiss" as Stella Soleil
- "Pretty Young Thing" as Stella Soleil
- "Eyes" (Glaza/Глаза) feat. Dolphin (Delfin/Дельфин)
