= Dirty Little Rabbits (album) =

Studio album by Dirty Little Rabbits
- Released: July 6, 2010
- Genre: Indie rock, experimental rock
- Length: 41:58
- Label: The End
- Producer: Shawn Crahan

Dirty Little Rabbits chronology
| Simon (2009) | Dirty Little Rabbits (2010) |

Singles from Dirty Little Rabbits
- 1. "Professional Hit" Released: May 11, 2010

Professional ratings
Review scores
| Source | Rating |
|---|---|
| AllMusic | 3/5 stars |
| Rock Sound | 7/10 |

Dirty Little Rabbits is the only album by American indie band Dirty Little Rabbits, released in 2010. "Hello" was previously released on Breeding and Simon. "Happy" and "You Say" were previously released on Simon.

== Critical reception ==
AllMusic called the album "a debut that’s sometimes rough, often enigmatic, and almost always fun." Rock Sound wrote that "the supremely versatile vocal stylings of Stella K are particularly striking, as she yaps, croaks, yells and croons in equal measure, pushing each distinctly oddball, organ-infused groover relentlessly forward."

== Track listing ==
All tracks are written by Dirty Little Rabbits.

| No. | Title | Length |
|---|---|---|
| 1. | "Simon" | 3:28 |
| 2. | "You Say" | 3:19 |
| 3. | "Put It In The Rock" | 3:53 |
| 4. | "Hello" | 4:05 |
| 5. | "Happy" | 3:29 |
| 6. | "I Love You" | 4:17 |
| 7. | "Professional Hit" | 4:34 |
| 8. | "If" | 3:43 |
| 9. | "Leave Me Alone" | 4:04 |
| 10. | "The Didn'ts" | 2:39 |
| 11. | "Rabbit Holes" | 4:27 |

== Personnel ==
- Stella Katsoudas – vocals
- Ty Fury – guitars
- Jeff Karnowski – bass
- Michael Pfaff – keyboards, organ
- Shawn Crahan – drums
