= Big Orange Clown Records =

American record label

- Parent company: Sanctuary Records
- Founded: 2003
- Founder: Shawn Crahan
- Distributor(s): Sanctuary Records
- Genre: Metalcore
- Country of origin: U.S.
- Location: Des Moines, Iowa
- Official website: bigorangeclown.com

Big Orange Clown Records is a Des Moines, Iowa-based record label founded by Shawn Crahan of the band Slipknot.

== History ==
The label was launched in Des Moines, Iowa in 2003. Crahan has said that he is always thinking about the future and he loves music, so starting a record label and producing albums was a natural step for him. During an interview with Billboard Crahan said that he's interested in signing artists from any genre and he's "looking for people who dig into their souls and they mean it." The label has focused mainly on unsigned bands, even advertising on the internet for unsigned bands to get in contact with them by post. In 2005, Crahan planned to release a second album for his band To My Surprise through the label, however in 2006 the band broke up without releasing a second album. Currently, Gizmachi is the only band on the label's roster.

== Artists ==
- To My Surprise
- Gizmachi

== Discography ==
- To My Surprise - To My Surprise (2003)
- Gizmachi - The Imbuing (2005)
