= Bad Trip =

Bad Trip may refer to:

- Bad trip, a frightening and unpleasant experience triggered by psychoactive drugs
- Bad Trip, a 1988 low-budget film by Phillip J. Roth
- Bad Trip (film), a 2020 comedy film starring Eric Andre
- "Bad Trip" (song), a 2017 song by Jhené Aiko
- "Bad Trip", a 2022 song by Lauv from All 4 Nothing

== See also ==
- Bad Acid Trip, an American metal band
