= All Out Life =

2018 single by Slipknot

Single by Slipknot

from the album We Are Not Your Kind (Japanese version)
- Released: October 31, 2018
- Genre: Thrash metal
- Length: 5:40
- Label: Roadrunner
- Songwriters: Shawn Crahan; Jim Root; Corey Taylor
- Producers: Greg Fidelman; Slipknot

Slipknot singles chronology
"Goodbye" (2016)	"All Out Life" (2018)	"Unsainted" (2019)

Music video
- "All Out Life" on YouTube

"All Out Life" is a song by American heavy metal band Slipknot, released as an independent single on October 31, 2018, by Roadrunner Records. It was the band's first single in nearly three years, following "Goodbye". It is the final release to feature longtime percussionist and backing vocalist Chris Fehn before his departure from the band in March 2019.

The single was accompanied by a music video directed by the band's percussionist Shawn Crahan. The song was included as a bonus track on the Japanese release of the band's sixth album We Are Not Your Kind (2019).

== Composition and lyrics ==
According to Slipknot frontman Corey Taylor, "All Out Life" was written as "a rallying cry for everyone ... about all of us getting together and saying, 'You know what. Let's not talk about old. Let's not talk about new. Let's talk about what is. Let's talk about what's good, what's real, and get behind that and start embracing things that matter because there's history there and not just because it's the next best thing." Taylor also provided the following additional background to the composition of the song:

"All Out Life" is a song that is trying to do two things: bring everyone together, but also remind everyone that the past is not something to be discarded with disdain. People are so eager to find the next big thing sometimes that they shit all over the bands and artists that have come before, thus making the past feel disposable, like a dirty thing. Fuck that: Why should we pay attention to your mediocre future when you can't be bothered to celebrate an amazing past? I'd rather listen to a guaranteed hit than a forced miss. "All Out Life" is the anthem that reminds people that it's not the date on the music – it's the staying power.

== Promotion and release ==
"All Out Life" premiered as the "World Record" on Zane Lowe's Beats 1 radio show on October 31, 2018, after which the song was made available for digital download.

The song was chosen as the theme song for WWE's weekly show NXT on April 4, 2019.

Despite its title being taken from a lyric in the chorus, the song is not on the regular version of We Are Not Your Kind. According to Taylor, this is because it was only intended as a song to let Slipknot's fans know that they are still around, and he thought the lyric "would just be a cool crowd chant". "All Out Life" does appear on the Japanese version of We Are Not Your Kind.

== Style and reception ==
Andrew Trendell of the NME described "All Out Life" as "thrash-heavy". Nick Ruskell commented that "There's an intensity that outstrips pretty much anything from [the band's] last three records, with a streak of venom running through it that could have been vomited forth from Iowa." Scott Munro of Metal Hammer dubbed the single "ferocious" and "incredible".

The track was nominated for a Kerrang! Award for Best Song.

== Track listing ==
Digital Download
No.	Title	Writer(s)	Length
1.	"All Out Life"	Corey Taylor; Jim Root; Shawn Crahan	5:56
Total length:			5:56

Black Friday "All Out Life/Unsainted" 7" Vinyl
No.	Title	Writer(s)	Length
1.	"All Out Life"	Corey Taylor; Jim Root; Shawn Crahan	5:56
2.	"Unsainted"	Taylor; Root; Crahan	4:20
Total length:			10:16

== Music video ==
The music video for "All Out Life" was debuted alongside the single's release on October 31, 2018, to commemorate a Halloween celebration by the band. The video was directed by the band's co-founder, percussionist and music video director, Shawn "Clown" Crahan.

The video starts off with a crowd of people standing up on a prison bus, wearing white clothing, symbolic with angels contrasted by them all wearing the same creepy facemasks, akin to that of demons. The crowd of people start to make intense movements before running off the bus in time with when Corey Taylor's vocals hit. The crowd runs into a warehouse where they meet several black-hooded figures and bow down to them, as if being instructed. They all stand up and raise their hands in unison as the song's bridge hits. The black-hooded figures then spray blood down at the cult from a higher level, covering all of them in blood that is akin to a satanism ritual. As the song ends, the leader of the cult approaches the bus with the rest following in tow, before igniting the bus up in flames by way of a lighter being dropped into gasoline.

Kerrang! writer Nick Ruskell noted that the video does not feature any of the band members, and described that it depicts "hooded-up figures being carted off to prison to be sprayed in gore like something from The Human Centipede 3".

== Charts ==
=== Weekly charts ===
Weekly chart performance for "All Out Life"
Chart (2018–19)	Peak position
Australia Digital Tracks (ARIA)	42
Canada Digital Songs (Billboard)	32
Hungary (Single Top 40)	21
New Zealand Hot Singles (RMNZ)	26
Scottish Singles Sales (Official Charts)	57
Sweden Heatseeker (Sverigetopplistan)	12
UK Singles (Official Charts)	99
UK Rock & Metal (Official Charts)	7
US Digital Song Sales (Billboard)	29
US Hot Rock & Alternative Songs (Billboard)	15

=== Year-end charts ===
Year-end chart performance for "All Out Life"
Chart (2019)	Position
US Hot Rock & Alternative Songs (Billboard)	89
