= Brandon Darner =

American record producer

- Genres: Rock; alternative rock; alternative metal
- Occupations: Record producer; songwriter; musician
- Instruments: Guitar; drums; vocals

Brandon Ray Darner is an American record producer. He has produced albums for a number of artists, including Imagine Dragons, To My Surprise, and his alternative rock band, the Envy Corps among others. Darner is a founding member of the Envy Corps. Darner was also a touring percussionist for the heavy metal band Slipknot in 1998.

== Production credits ==
- Prismism – Keuning (2019)
- Sparkle Sparkle – Holy White Hounds (2016, Razor & Tie)
- Pop Sucker (EP) – John June Year (2014)
- What's Fresh – Usonia (2012)
- "It's Time" – Imagine Dragons (2012, Interscope) US number 15, UK number 23
- "Amsterdam" – Imagine Dragons (2012, Interscope) UK number 143
- "The River" – Imagine Dragons (2012, Interscope)
- It Culls You – The Envy Corps (2011)
- Kings & Queens of Air – Bright Giant (2011)
- It's Time – Imagine Dragons (2011)
- Bright Giant (EP) – Bright Giant (2009)
- Kid Gloves – The Envy Corps (2009, Tempo Club)
- Brain Cycles – Radio Moscow (2009, Alive)
- Dwell – The Envy Corps (2008, Vertigo)
- To My Surprise – To My Surprise (2003, Roadrunner)
