= The Imbuing =

Studio album by Gizmachi
- Released: May 3, 2005
- Recorded: Spin Studios (Long Island City, Queens, New York)
- Genre: Progressive metalcore; nu metal
- Length: 46:08
- Label: Big Orange Clown
- Producer: Shawn Crahan

Gizmachi chronology
Melee (2003)	The Imbuing (2005)

Professional ratings
Review scores
Source	Rating
Blabbermouth.net	6.5/10 stars
Melodic	2.5/5 stars

The Imbuing is the second full-length album by American metal band Gizmachi. It was released in 2005 through Big Orange Clown Records, a subsidiary of Sanctuary Records. The album would garner the band a coveted slot on the 2005 trek of the summer tour, Ozzfest.

The track "The Answer" is featured in the 2006 video game Final Fight: Streetwise.

== Track listing ==
No.	Title	Length
1.	"The Answer"	5:49
2.	"Wandering Eyes"	5:05
3.	"Bloodwine"	5:50
4.	"Burn"	4:19
5.	"Romantic Devastation"	4:58
6.	"Wearing Skin"	5:07
7.	"People Show"	6:54
8.	"Voice of Sanity"	8:04
Total length:		46:08

== Credits ==
- Sean Kane - vocals
- Mike Laurino - vocals, guitar
- Jason Hannon - lead guitar
- Kris Gilmore - bass
- Jimmie Hatcher - drums
- Shawn Crahan - producer
- Josh Wilbur - mixing
- Howie Weinberg - mastering
