= Simon (EP) =

EP by Dirty Little Rabbits
- Released: January 27, 2009
- Recorded: Sound Farm in Jamaica, Iowa
- Genre: Indie
- Length: 22:24
- Label: The End
- Producer: Shawn Crahan

Dirty Little Rabbits chronology
Breeding (2007)	Simon (2009)	Dirty Little Rabbits (2010)

Professional ratings
Review scores
Source	Rating
Allmusic	3.5/5 stars
Blabbermouth.net	6.5/10 stars
Blogcritics	(favorable)
MachineGunFunk	3.5/5 stars
PureGrainAudio	(9.3/10)

Simon is the second EP by American indie band Dirty Little Rabbits. The EP was recorded and produced at the Sound Farm Studio & Recording Environment in Jamaica, Iowa and was scheduled for release on January 20, 2009, however it was pushed back a week and released on January 27, 2009, through The End Records. Simon was the first release by the band which will be available to a much wider range of people, whereas their first EP; Breeding was available only through select music stores in the United States.

== Track listing ==
1. "Poor Poor Woman with Her Head in the Oven" - 4:03
2. "You Say" - 3:23
3. "Hello" - 4:12
4. "I'm So Beautiful" - 3:51
5. "Happy" - 3:29
6. "Same Mistakes" - 3:26

== Personnel ==
- Stella Katsoudas - vocals
- Ty Fyhrie - guitars
- Jeff Karnowski - bass
- Shawn Crahan - drums, producer, art direction, photography
- Michael Pfaff - keyboards
- Matt Sepanic - mixing, mastering, engineering
- AJ Mogis - mixing, engineering
- Doug Van Sloun - mastering
- "Tadpoll" - engineering
- Ryan Martin - engineering
