= Unsainted =

Single by Slipknot

from the album We Are Not Your Kind
- Released: May 16, 2019
- Genre: Nu metal
- Length: 4:20
- Label: Roadrunner
- Songwriters: Shawn Crahan; Jim Root; Corey Taylor
- Producers: Greg Fidelman; Slipknot

Slipknot singles chronology
"All Out Life" (2018)	"Unsainted" (2019)	"Solway Firth" (2019)

Music video
- "Unsainted" on YouTube

"Unsainted" is a song by American heavy metal band Slipknot. It was released as the lead single from their sixth studio album We Are Not Your Kind on May 16, 2019, accompanied by its music video. This is the first Slipknot single released since "All Out Life", which was released on October 31, 2018, as well as their first single without their former percussionist Chris Fehn, who left the band earlier in March 2019.

== Critical reception ==
Jon Blistein of Rolling Stone called the song an "unsparing headbanger", saying it "opens with an expertly crafted build, as choir vocals—performed by the Angel City Chorale—float above rumbling drums, tidal wave guitars and frontman Corey Taylor's vocals" before becoming the "double bass drum hits and jagged guitars that carry the rest of the song". Revolver called it a "much more accessible, radio-friendly cut" than the band's non-album single "All Out Life", although felt that this "doesn't mean that its lyrics pull any punches", judging it to be "explosive".

== Track listing ==
Digital Download / CD
No.	Title	Writer(s)	Length
1.	"Unsainted"	Corey Taylor; Jim Root; Shawn Crahan	4:20
Total length:			4:20

Black Friday "All Out Life/Unsainted" 7" Vinyl
No.	Title	Writer(s)	Length
1.	"All Out Life"	Taylor; Root; Crahan	5:56
2.	"Unsainted"	Taylor; Root; Crahan	4:20
Total length:			10:16

== Music video ==
A music video directed by Shawn "Clown" Crahan was released alongside the song on May 16, 2019. Blistein characterized the video as full of "creepy, cultish imagery". It ends with Corey Taylor walking out of a church to find he and the other members of the band turned into statues, then proceeding to light his statue on fire. Luke Morton of Kerrang! called the video "a lot to take in", writing that it is "full of kaleidoscopic visuals, religious iconography, [and] fire".

== In other media ==
In 2019, "Unsainted" was selected as the official theme song for WWE's NXT TakeOver: Toronto PPV.

== Charts ==
=== Weekly charts ===
Weekly chart performance for "Unsainted"
Chart (2019)	Peak position
Australia (ARIA)	86
Canada Digital Songs (Billboard)	21
Czech Republic Singles Digital (ČNS IFPI)	70
France (SNEP Sales Chart)	85
Hungary (Single Top 40)	11
Hungary (Stream Top 40)	38
New Zealand Hot Singles (RMNZ)	17
Scottish Singles Sales (Official Charts)	34
Slovakia Singles Digital (ČNS IFPI)	66
Sweden Heatseeker (Sverigetopplistan)	14
UK Singles (OCC)	68
UK Rock & Metal (OCC)	2
US Bubbling Under Hot 100 (Billboard)	20
US Digital Song Sales (Billboard)	26
US Hot Rock & Alternative Songs (Billboard)	4
US Rock & Alternative Airplay (Billboard)	38

=== Year-end charts ===
Year-end chart performance for "Unsainted"
Chart (2019)	Position
US Hot Rock & Alternative Songs (Billboard)	21

== Certifications ==
Certifications for "Unsainted"
Region	Certification	Certified units/sales
Canada (Music Canada)	Platinum	80,000^{‡}
New Zealand (RMNZ)	Gold	15,000^{‡}
Poland (ZPAV)	Gold	10,000^{‡}
Portugal (AFP)	Gold	5,000^{‡}
United Kingdom (BPI)	Silver	200,000^{‡}
United States (RIAA)	Gold	500,000^{‡}
^{‡} Sales+streaming figures based on certification alone.
