= To My Surprise =

American experimental rock band

- The last active incarnation of the band. From left to right: Paul Thompson, Steven Robinson, Shawn Crahan, Dorothy Hecht, Wade Thompson, Jarrod Brom

Background information
- Also known as: The Ornge (2002–2003)
- Origin: Des Moines, Iowa, U.S.
- Genres: Experimental rock; alternative rock; indie rock
- Years active: 2002–2006
- Labels: Roadrunner; Big Orange Clown
- Past members: Dorothy Hecht; Jarrod Brom; Paul Thompson; Wade Thompson; Shawn Crahan; Stevan Robinson; Brandon Darner

To My Surprise was an American experimental rock band formed in 2002 in Des Moines, Iowa. They are referred to as a side project of Shawn Crahan, a member/founder of heavy metal band Slipknot. In 2003 they released their debut album To My Surprise, however after losing frontman Brandon Darner in 2004 they parted ways with their record label. 2005 saw four new members join the band to begin work on a second album and in 2006 they began performing shows in the US. However, shortly after To My Surprise canceled several upcoming appearances and disbanded without releasing a second album.

== History ==
In June 2002, Shawn Crahan, Brandon Darner and Steven Robinson began working on an album together. During an interview with MTV in 2003 Crahan explained; "I've been keeping in touch with the music side of myself," and that To My Surprise is "a movement towards understanding [himself] and who [he is]." Two songs that Crahan and Darner wrote in 2002 were sent to producer Rick Rubin, without the intent of working with him. However, Rubin invited the band to Cello Studios in Los Angeles to work on an album. On October 7, 2003, the band released their debut album To My Surprise through Roadrunner Records. A music video for the track "In The Mood" premiered on MTV's Extreme show on December 1. In 2004 "Get It To Go" featured on the soundtrack for the video game MVP Baseball 2004. Also in 2004, Crahan began working with Slipknot again in preparation of the release of their third album. At this time vocalist Darner was—as Crahan describes it—"at an age where he was ready to start his career" but Crahan had other commitments with Slipknot and Darner decided to leave To My Surprise. Shortly after this, with only releasing one album by the band, Roadrunner Records parted ways with To My Surprise.

In 2005—after Slipknot had finished touring—Crahan and Robinson got back together to work on new material, enlisting the help of Dorothy Hecht, Jarrod Brom, Paul Thompson, Wade Thompson and Patrick McBride making the band twice its original size. The band were working on a second album which they planned to release through Crahan's own label Big Orange Clown Records. In 2006 it was announced that the band would release a limited edition 7" record, however the band began performing shows and this brought a halt to work in the studio. Most notably To My Surprise performed at South by Southwest, which Crahan described as "a dream come true". Prior to their performance at South by Southwest a track entitled "Jump The Gun" was released online as part of an e-card. They also planned to perform at festivals in Europe and tour the US, however the band canceled their appearances at European festivals and parted ways. Crahan said that the reason the band "died" was because it was unrealistic for him to be in this band and make it work and that "Slipknot made it impossible".

== Musical style ==
To My Surprise found its name from people's reaction to their music, primarily based on peoples prejudice based on Crahan's most notable band Slipknot's musical style. Crahan went as far as saying "I'd have to put a gun in my mouth if it was metal," because he's already in "the best metal band in the world". Their musical style has been noted to include; glam rock, new wave, pop, country rock, alternative rock and disco. They have been compared to Cake, The Strokes, Faith No More, Weezer, Syd Barrett, They Might Be Giants, Hater, The Presidents of the United States of America and Harvey Danger, among others.

== Band members ==
=== Final members ===
- Dorothy Hecht – vocals, keyboards (2005–2006)
- Jarrod Brom – guitars, keyboards (2005–2006)
- Paul Thompson – guitars, vocals (2005–2006)
- Wade Thompson – bass, vocals (2005–2006)
- Shawn Crahan – drums, vocals, guitar (2002–2006)
- Patrick McBride – vocals (2005–2006)

=== Former members ===
- Stevan Robinson – guitars, vocals (2002–2006)
- Brandon Darner – guitars, vocals (2002–2004)

== Discography ==
- To My Surprise (2003)
