= To My Surprise (album) =

Studio album by To My Surprise
- Released: October 7, 2003
- Recorded: 2003 at Cello Studios in Hollywood, California
- Genres: Alternative rock; indie pop
- Length: 41:17
- Label: Roadrunner
- Producers: Shawn Crahan; Brandon Darner; Rick Rubin (exec.)

To My Surprise is the only album by American alternative rock band To My Surprise. Released on October 7, 2003 by Roadrunner Records, it was the only album that the band released before disbanding in 2006. The album was intended to be self-produced by Shawn Crahan and Brandon Darner, but after producer Rick Rubin was sent demos by Crahan, Rubin invited the band to Los Angeles where he assumed the role of executive producer. Following the release of the album, a music video was released for the song "In The Mood" on December 1.

The album was generally well received by critics, who remarked on its diversity and significantly different musical style to that of drummer Crahan's other band Slipknot. They noted that it features music inspired by The Beatles, Led Zeppelin, Pink Floyd and Weezer, among others. However the album did not appear on any sales charts.

== History ==
In June 2002, band members Shawn Crahan, Brandon Darner and Stevan Robinson began working on an album together. Drummer Crahan told MTV that working on this album "made [him] find [his] voice" and that with his other band Slipknot he had been "hurting for a long time for a musical voice". In an interview with Launch, he said that writing the track "The World's Too Small" was his "most magical musical experience" because "[he] was giving more than on just one or two simple ideas." In 2003 Crahan sent producer Rick Rubin two songs that he and Darner had written, primarily to receive an opinion on the songs. However, Rubin invited the band to Cello Studios in Los Angeles to work on an album. It was there that the album featuring 11 tracks was self-produced by Crahan and Darner, with Rubin as executive producer.

On October 7, 2003, To My Surprise was released through Roadrunner Records. An animated music video for the track "In The Mood" was produced by BoingBoing, which was premiered on MTV's Extreme show on December 1. Also, the track "Get It To Go" was featured on the soundtrack for the video game MVP Baseball 2004. To My Surprise did not tour in 2003 to promote the album because Crahan was working with Slipknot on their third album. However, they did perform a limited number shows in North America the following year.

== Musical style ==
Prior to the release of the album, drummer Crahan touted To My Surprise as "a hybrid of folk, '70s rock fuzz and schizophrenic grooves". Neil Strauss of The New York Times stated that each song has a unique sound, concluding that they sound like "pop songs that have been pushed off balance". In another article Strauss includes They Might Be Giants, Weezer and Faith No More as bands with similar-sounding "elements". Rowan Shaeffer of Counterculture, commented on the album's diversity, saying "to say that the [album] is eclectic would be a gross understatement," citing Pink Floyd and Mr. Bungle as evident influences. The Calgary Sun's Mike Bell cited "glam, new wave, Beatles pop and country rock" as the sounds the album presents. In his review for Allmusic Robert L. Doerschuk noted that the track "Sunday" makes musical references to the single "Pleasant Valley Sunday" by The Monkees, giving the "happy, strumming guitars and skippy rhythms" as similarities. He also said that they quote "one of the darker verses in the Jim Morrison songbook".

== Reception ==
Professional ratings
Review scores
Source	Rating
Allmusic	3/5 stars
babysue	5/6 stars
Calgary Sun	3.5/5 stars
Counterculture	2.5/5 stars
The New York Times	(favorable)

To My Surprise was met with generally favorable critical reviews, but did not appear on any sales charts. One point which was generally drawn upon was the significant difference between their musical style to that of Crahan's other band Slipknot. Reviewer Neil Strauss opens his review with a reference to the title of the album, saying, "And, truly, it is a surprise", and then going on to say that the album "is commendable not just because [it is] different but because [it is] good". Robert L. Doerschuk of Allmusic declares that the album—aside from the track "Say Goodbye"—"maintains a buoyant and unsubtle approach". He also noted Crahan's "muscular style" as a notable element to the album saying that "[it] transplants well into this setting, which probably should not have been a surprise after all". The vocals on the album were praised by the reviewers at babysue, saying "the vocals [are] masculine yet right on key". When reviewing for Calgary Sun, Mike Bell highlighted their eclectic nature and in conclusion said the album is "fittingly, fun and surprising". However Rowan Shaeffer of Counterculture said that their diversity was ultimately their strength and weakness; he suggested that they relied too heavily on their influences by creating songs of other bands, saying that "the only [song] left out was the To My Surprise song".

== Track listing ==
All songs are written and arranged by To My Surprise.

1. "The World's Too Small" – 3:37
2. "Get It To Go" – 3:12
3. "In The Mood" – 3:31
4. "Blue" – 3:59
5. "Say Goodbye" – 3:33
6. "Easy Or Not" – 2:54
7. "Turn It Back Around" – 3:25
8. "This Life" – 5:34
9. "Come With Me" – 3:47
10. "Sunday" – 3:22
11. "Who's To Say" – 4:23

== Personnel ==
- Rick Rubin – executive producer
- Shawn Crahan – drums, vocals, scratch, producer, art direction, photography
- Brandon Darner – guitars, vocals, scratch, producer
- Stevan Robinson – guitars, vocals
- Tal Herzberg – additional musician
- Jon Ginty – additional musician
- Ed Thacker – engineer / mixer
- Dan Lefter – assistant engineering
- Vlado Meller – mastering
- Monte Conner – A&R
- Mr. Scott Design – design
- Stefan Seskis – photography
- Jonathan Mannion – photography
- Alexandria K. Crahan – band sculpture
