= Gizmachi =

American heavy metal band

- Origin: Newburgh, New York, U.S.
- Genres: Progressive metal; groove metal; metalcore; nu metal
- Years active: 1998–present
- Label: Big Orange Clown
- Members: Sean Kane; Jason Hannon; Mike Laurino; Kris Gilmore; Jimmie Hatcher

Gizmachi is an American heavy metal band from Newburgh, New York, formed in 1998. They are signed to Big Orange Clown Records, a subsidiary of Sanctuary Records owned by Shawn "Clown" Crahan. Gizmachi was one of the bands on the second stage of Ozzfest in 2005. The band had Soilwork frontman Björn "Speed" Strid handle the vocals on their most recent album, 2021's Omega Kaleid, which was produced/engineered by Jay Hannon (Byzantine, Gods Below Us) and mixed by Mark Lewis (DevilDriver, The Black Dahlia Murder). Strid commented of his involvement: "Being a part of the new Gizmachi record was one of the most challenging adventures I've experienced. I can honestly say that I've grown as a metal singer since recording these vocals."

Vocalist Sean Kane is also a member of The Black Dots of Death, a group that includes Slipknot's Shawn "Clown" Crahan. Kane also appeared on Mushroomhead's Savior Sorrow album, on the track "Tattoo".

== Discography ==
=== Albums ===
- Melee (2003)
- The Imbuing (2005)
- Omega Kaleid (2021)

== Members ==
- Sean Kane – vocals
- Jason Hannon – lead guitar
- Mike Laurino – vocals, guitars
- Kris Gilmore – bass
- Jimmie Hatcher – drums
