= We Are Not Your Kind =

Studio album by Slipknot
- Released: August 9, 2019
- Recorded: November 2018 – April 2019
- Studios: EastWest, Hollywood, California
- Genres: Nu metal; alternative metal; groove metal
- Length: 63:29
- Label: Roadrunner
- Producers: Greg Fidelman; Slipknot

Slipknot chronology
Day of the Gusano: Live in Mexico (2017)	We Are Not Your Kind (2019)	The End, So Far (2022)

Slipknot studio album chronology
.5: The Gray Chapter (2014)	We Are Not Your Kind (2019)	The End, So Far (2022)

Singles from We Are Not Your Kind
- 1. "Unsainted" Released: May 16, 2019; 2. "Solway Firth" Released: July 22, 2019; 3. "Birth of the Cruel" Released: August 5, 2019; 4. "Nero Forte" Released: December 16, 2019

We Are Not Your Kind is the sixth studio album by American heavy metal band Slipknot. Recorded at EastWest Studios in Hollywood, California with co-producer Greg Fidelman (who previously produced the band's 2014 album .5: The Gray Chapter), it was released on August 9, 2019, by Roadrunner Records. The title is taken from a lyric in the song "All Out Life", which was released as a standalone single in 2018 and features as a bonus track on the Japanese edition of the album. We Are Not Your Kind is the only Slipknot album to be recorded as an eight-member band, as their former percussionist Chris Fehn was fired from the band in March 2019 after suing the group for alleged unpaid royalties.

After the conclusion of the touring cycle for .5: The Gray Chapter, Slipknot guitarist Jim Root and percussionist Shawn "Clown" Crahan began writing and demoing material for the band's follow-up album in early 2017. According to Crahan, the group wrote and recorded a total of 22 songs and 26 interludes, with the plan initially being to produce the band's first double album. Recording began in November 2018, shortly after the release of the standalone single "All Out Life". The album was completed by April 2019 and "Unsainted" was released as the lead single the next month. This was followed by "Solway Firth" in July, "Birth of the Cruel" in August and "Nero Forte" in December.

We Are Not Your Kind received critical acclaim; numerous commentators hailed the album as one of the best releases of Slipknot's career, praising the level of experimentation displayed on several key songs. Others highlighted it as a modern landmark release in the heavy metal genre. "Unsainted" reached number 10 on the US Billboard Mainstream Rock chart, while "Solway Firth" also reached the UK Rock & Metal Singles Chart top ten. We Are Not Your Kind debuted at number 1 on the US Billboard 200, becoming the band's third consecutive album to do so on both charts, as well as several other charts around the world.

== Background and writing ==
Work on Slipknot's sixth studio album began in February 2017, when the band's guitarist Jim Root and percussionist Shawn "Clown" Crahan started writing new material together. Speaking to Rolling Stone in November 2016, Crahan simply stated that "we want to write", but that a recording timeline would remain unconfirmed for the time being. He later elaborated on this plan by claiming that the group's members wanted to take their time working on new songs, rather than producing it within a set timeframe as they had done before. Plans for the direction of the album had been touted by the percussionist as early as the summer of 2015, when he claimed that he wanted to write an "art record" in the vein of The Wall by Pink Floyd or Sgt. Pepper's Lonely Hearts Club Band by the Beatles, likely in the form of a double album with an overall concept and numerous interludes. Several song ideas also came from rough demos tracked during the previous tour, with Crahan estimating that the band had "hundreds of ideas".

By August 2017, Crahan estimated that the writing process had spawned "about 27 pieces of work" so far. In an interview with the NME, he added that "A lot of us are meeting up in September to start working on those 27 pieces of music and we're going to add to that," reasserting his desire to make a double album. Following up with Metal Hammer in October, Crahan revealed that he had been working with Root and drummer Jay Weinberg on organizing the material written during the previous touring cycle, which combined with new material resulted in "seven or eight" full song ideas. Much of the initial writing process took place without the band's frontman Corey Taylor, who spent 2017 recording and touring in promotion of Hydrograd, the sixth album by his other band Stone Sour. The vocalist began writing lyrics for three new songs in early 2018, which he claimed would be based on events in his life over the last few years. By April, Taylor claimed that he had completed lyrics for "almost all" of the band's new music.

== Recording and production ==
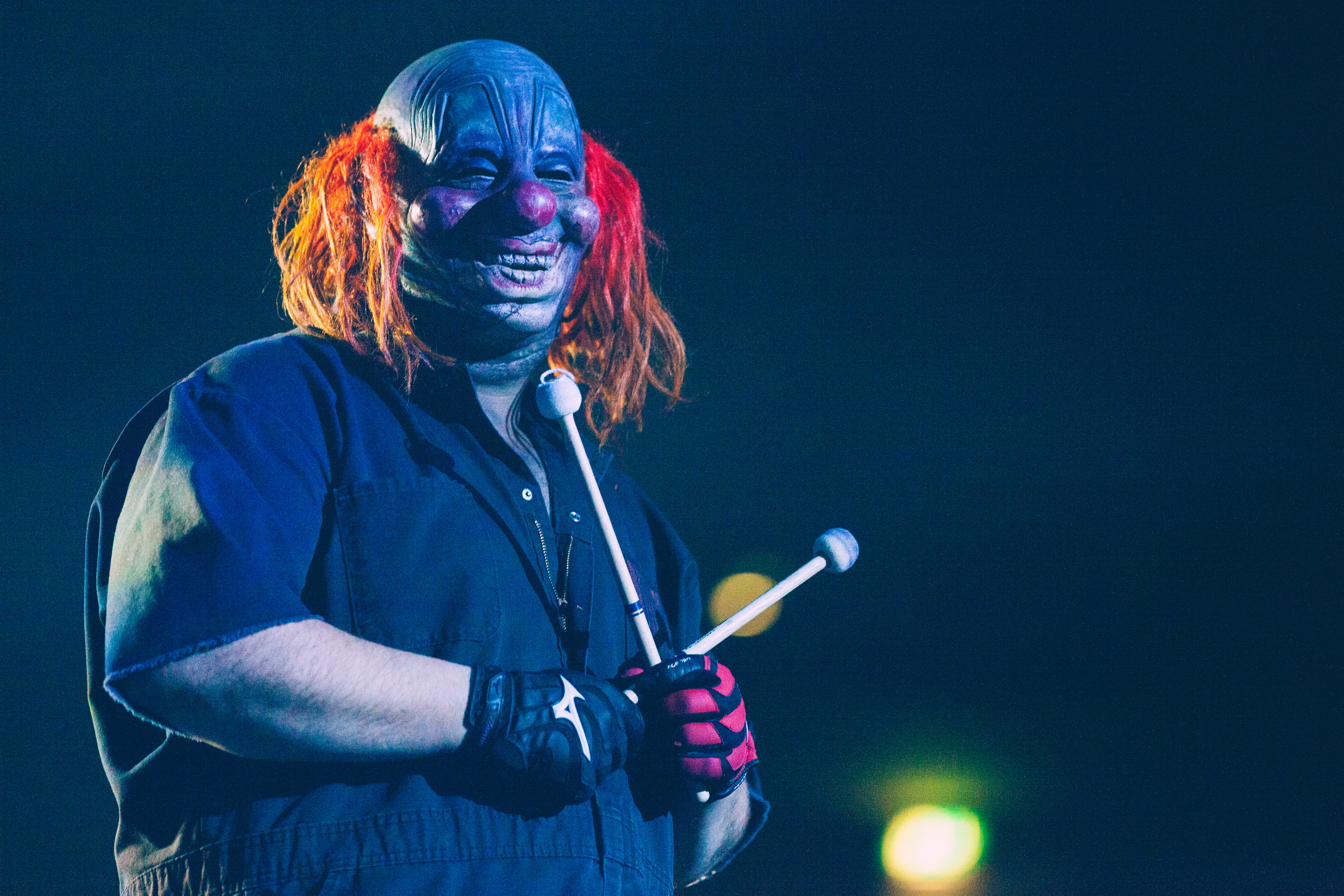
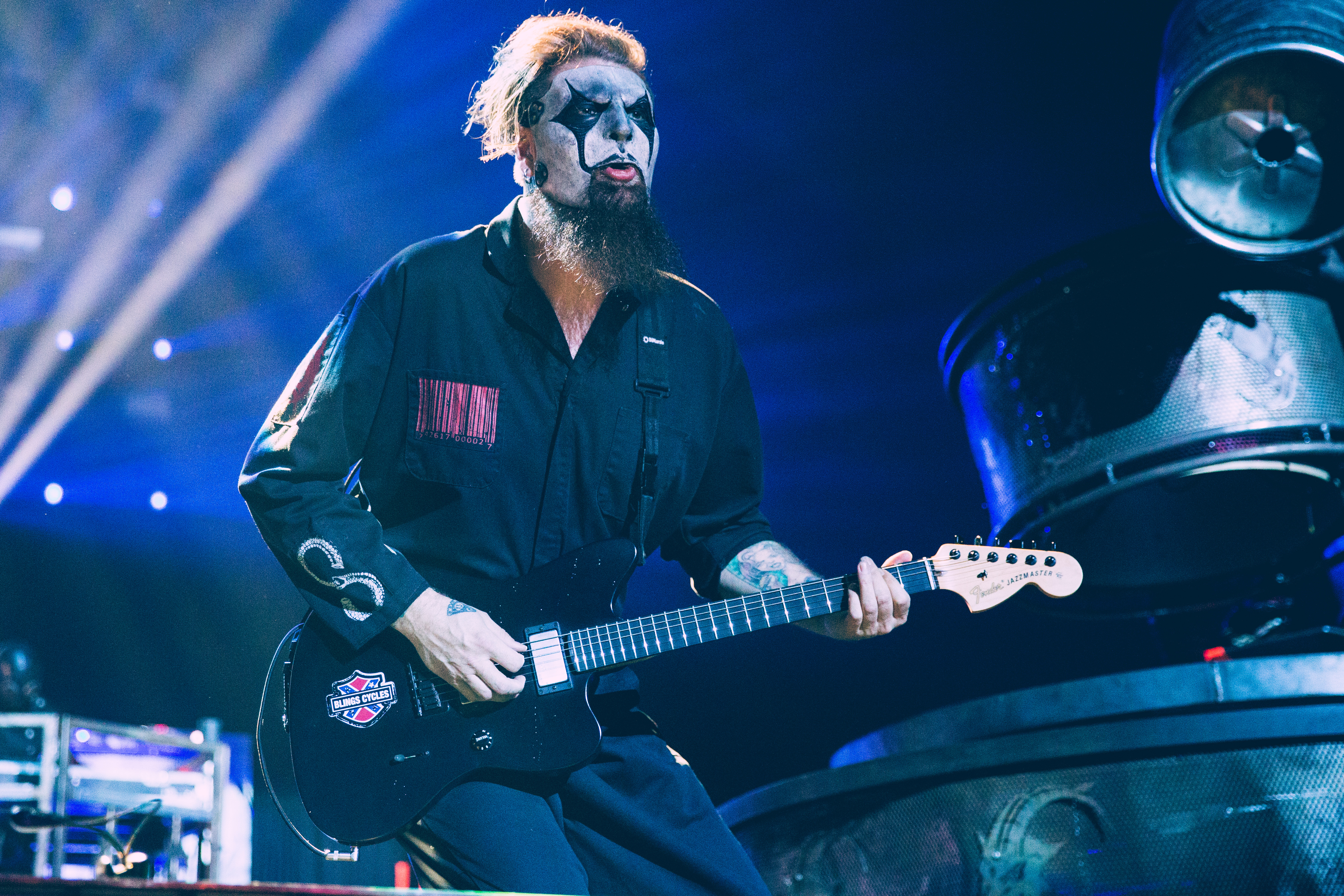
Writing for We Are Not Your Kind was initially spearheaded by Shawn "Clown" Crahan (top) and Jim Root (bottom).

After almost two years of writing, Shawn Crahan revealed that recording for Slipknot's sixth album would begin in November 2018. The full band later joined the percussionist in January 2019. Production was handled again by Greg Fidelman, who engineered and mixed 2004's Vol. 3: (The Subliminal Verses), and produced 2014's .5: The Gray Chapter and the 2018 single "All Out Life". Speaking about working with the producer, vocalist Corey Taylor credited Fidelman with his contributions to their previous releases and noted that "He gets us, he challenges us ... we have a great relationship with him". It was initially suggested in the media that Ross Robinson, who worked with the band on 1999's Slipknot and 2001's Iowa, would be producing the album, however this rumor was quickly dismissed by guitarist Jim Root. The recording of We Are Not Your Kind was completed by April 2019, when turntablist Sid Wilson revealed that he was "laying the last" of his parts on the album.

Speaking to British retailer HMV about the album's recording process, Root recalled that the band spent a lot of time working on initial arrangements for the new material, explaining that "We spent all the time on the demos. We built them and let them evolve." This allowed the band to "step back" from recordings and revisit them later, leading to what the guitarist described as an "organic" outcome. However, he added that the final tracking process was "a big challenge", lamenting that "I wish we'd had that time to actually record the album." Root also distinguished the approach on We Are Not Your Kind from its predecessor .5: The Gray Chapter; he recalled that for the 2014 release "[The] songs came straight from my garage and they don't have the push and pull of a live band," contrasting the recording of its follow-up by explaining that "we were playing the songs as a band and tracked them with and without a click track. The ones without click are the ones that we used on the record."

Due to the amount of time spent writing and recording demos for the album, there are many tracks from the We Are Not Your Kind sessions which remain unreleased. According to Crahan, the band recorded a total of 22 songs and 26 interludes for the album, with many shelved in favor of stronger tracks. Before the album's release, the percussionist revealed to Kerrang! magazine that "There's another 15 songs that didn't make the cut", estimating that "there's at least seven or eight songs that are recorded, with vocals, that did not make this album." Speaking on music streaming service Spotify's Metal Talks podcast, Crahan explained that when choosing what songs to include on an album, he tries to "picture [himself] as a fan in the world that we live in today". He went on to say that this line of thinking is what ultimately led to the exclusion of "All Out Life" from the album, claiming that he believed fans would prefer to hear a new song in place of one that was already available to stream.

== Composition and lyrics ==
Musically, We Are Not Your Kind has been described as nu metal, alternative metal, groove metal, extreme metal and hard rock. It has been recognized by commentators and band members as one of the most experimental albums of Slipknot's career. The album features moody instrumentals and has elements of electronic, progressive rock, electronic rock, rap metal, and electro-industrial. During a pre-release interview with Daniel P. Carter on the BBC Radio 1 Rock Show, Corey Taylor claimed that "it is probably the furthest we've pushed the boundaries of creativity and experimentation," adding that "We not only went places that we've hinted at musically over the years, but never really went full-board, but we're also doing heavier things than we've ever done." Emily Carter of Kerrang! described it as "the 'Knot's most experimental album to date," NME writer Jordan Bassett called it "Slipknot at their artiest", and Roisin O'Connor of The Independent claimed that "The sheer ambition of We Are Not Your Kind is just as staggering as their seminal record Iowa". Several critics highlighted "Spiders" as one of the most avant-garde songs on the album, on which "creepy piano tinklings" and "scattershot drum beats" are favored over the more commonly used low-end guitar riffs.

Another quality of We Are Not Your Kind touted in the build-up to its release was the heaviness of the music. As early as June 2018, Taylor claimed that their sixth album would be "Iowa levels of heavy". He later reiterated the suggestion, claiming that the album contains one of the heaviest songs of their career. Sam Taylor of the Financial Times admitted that the band "weren't bluffing" when making such claims, suggesting that the album "often verges on the attritional". Similarly, Gigwise writer Anna Smith suggested that We Are Not Your Kind featured "some of the heaviest material since [the band's] eponymous debut". Reviewing the album for the website Blabbermouth.net, Jay H. Gorania praised the band's attempts at being heavy on We Are Not Your Kind – describing their first two albums, Gorania opined that "Slipknot seemed as though they were trying to be the heaviest band on the market and trying too hard," before concluding that "When they are in overdrive nowadays, however, it feels more authentic and expressive."

According to Taylor, We Are Not Your Kind features some of his most personal lyrics to date. During the writing process, the band's frontman explained that "It's been a heavy couple of years for me personally. [...] I've been able to kind of grab hold of some of the depression that I've been fighting and kind of formulate the way that I want to describe it." Early on in the process, he claimed that "It's probably the most autobiographical I've been in years", describing the lyrical content as "dark ... really dark". One of the main influences on Taylor's lyrics was his separation from then-wife Stephanie Luby in 2016; in an interview with Loudwire, he explained that "The narrative [of the album] really came from me working my way through the repercussions of a really toxic relationship. And the fallout that came with finally extricating myself from that relationship." Another major influence on the album's lyrical content is that of global "divisiveness", which Taylor claims is fueled by US President Donald Trump through "bigotry" and "racism".

== Promotion and release ==
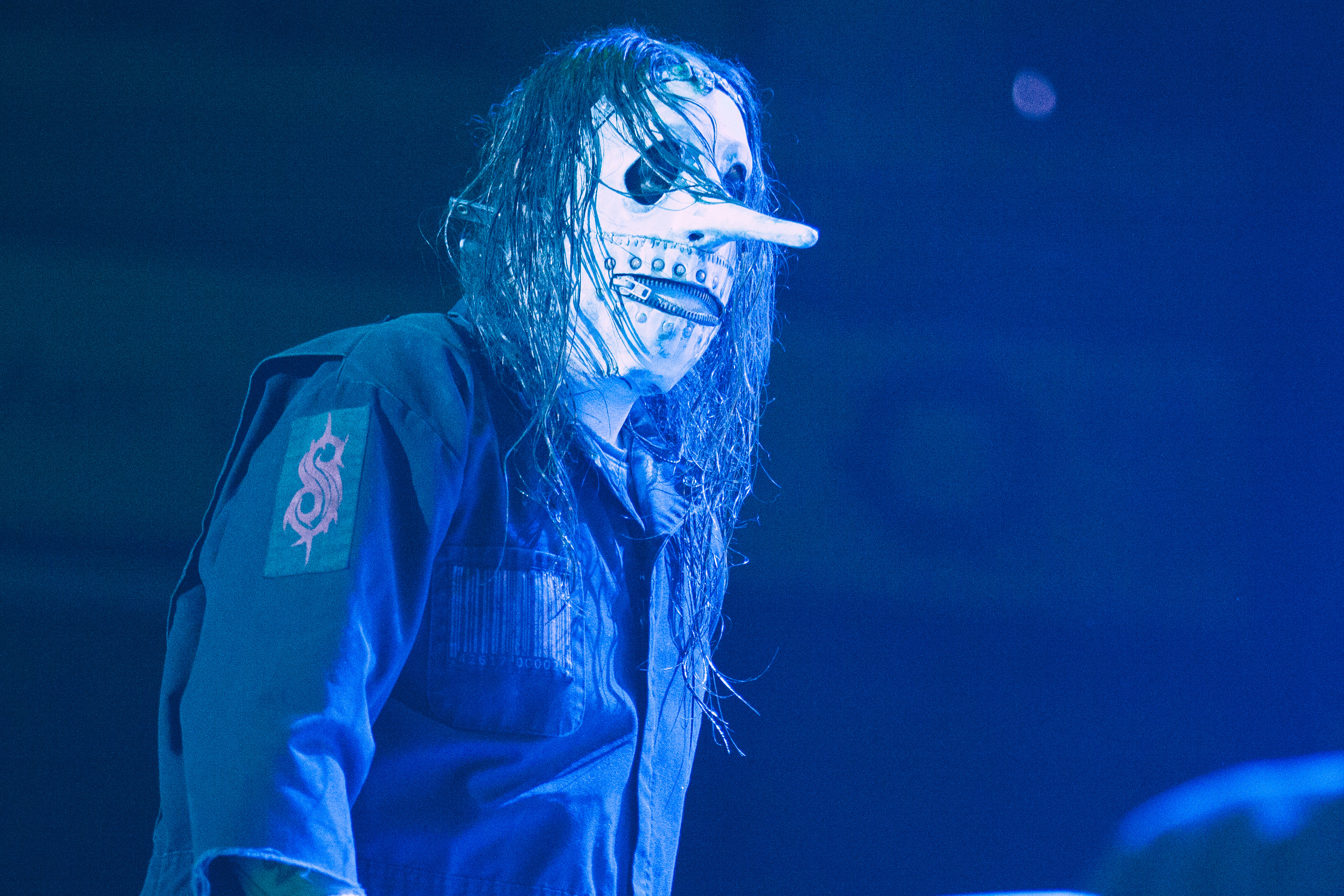
Percussionist Chris Fehn was fired from Slipknot in March 2019, after suing the band claiming unpaid royalties.

The first new song released during the recording process for We Are Not Your Kind was the single "All Out Life" on October 31, 2018. It was produced by Greg Fidelman, who later also worked on the album. The song's music video, directed by Shawn "Clown" Crahan, broke the band's record for most views in a single day on YouTube, with more than 3.4 million. The track was initially slated to appear on We Are Not Your Kind (the title of which is lifted from one of the song's main lyrics), however when the track listing was revealed it was not included; vocalist Corey Taylor later explained that "it was kind of its own thing that really just let people know that we weren't gone". In February 2019, the band launched a teaser website at the URL wearenotyourkind.com, with the album's release date confirmed a few days later. Two months later, the band revealed the track listing for the album and officially confirmed that it would be called We Are Not Your Kind.

Less than two weeks after the announcement of the album's release date, it was revealed that percussionist Chris Fehn was suing the rest of the band (with Taylor and Crahan named as separate defendants), claiming that royalties from merchandising and touring had been withheld from him. A few days later he was dismissed from the band, with the official news release stating that "Chris knows why he is no longer a part of Slipknot. We are disappointed that he chose to point fingers and manufacture claims, rather than doing what was necessary to continue to be a part of Slipknot." Fehn's position was taken by an as-yet unknown replacement, dubbed by fans as "Tortilla Man" due to the design of his mask. Jim Root later claimed that Fehn's departure had little impact on the production of the album.

On May 16, 2019, the day of the album's official announcement, Slipknot released "Unsainted" as the first single from We Are Not Your Kind, alongside a music video which revealed each member's new mask. The video broke the record set by "All Out Life" as the band's most popular in its first 24 hours on YouTube, receiving over 4.7 million views. The single peaked at number 10 on the US Billboard Mainstream Rock chart, the band's highest position since "The Devil in I" in 2014, and at number 68 on the UK Singles Chart, the band's highest position since "Psychosocial" in 2008. Both "Unsainted" and "All Out Life" received their live premieres the following day, when the band performed on Jimmy Kimmel Live! in their first live appearance since November 2016. "Solway Firth" was released as the album's second single on July 22, reaching number 14 on the Billboard Hot Rock Songs chart. On August 5, "Birth of the Cruel", was released as the third single and "Nero Forte" was the fourth single, released on December 16.

Following their brief performance on Jimmy Kimmel Live!, Slipknot performed at a number of European festivals during the summer of 2019. The run included the band's fourth headline slot at the UK's Download Festival in June, footage from which was later included in the "Solway Firth" music video. This was followed by the first Knotfest Roadshow tour in North America from July to September. Slipknot was due to open for Metallica later in the year for a run of shows in Australia and New Zealand on its WorldWired Tour, however the shows were later canceled due to Metallica frontman James Hetfield entering rehab. A tour of the UK and Europe will follow in 2020. We Are Not Your Kind was released worldwide on August 9, 2019, by Roadrunner Records. "All Out Life" was featured as a bonus track on the Japanese edition of the release.

== Critical reception ==
Professional ratings
Aggregate scores
Source	Rating
AnyDecentMusic?	7.8/10
Metacritic	89/100
Review scores
Source	Rating
AllMusic	4/5 stars
Consequence of Sound	A
Exclaim!	8/10
The Guardian	4/5 stars
The Independent	5/5 stars
Kerrang!	5/5 stars
Metal Hammer	4/5 stars
NME	5/5 stars
Pitchfork	6.7/10
Rolling Stone	3.5/5 stars

According to the review aggregator Metacritic, We Are Not Your Kind received "universal acclaim" based on a weighted average score of 89 out of 100 from 14 critic scores. Forbes writer Quentin Singer claimed that the album was "a metal magnum opus".

In a five-star review for the NME, Jordan Bassett described We Are Not Your Kind as "an astonishing record: a roaring, horrifying delve into the guts of the band's revulsion, a primal scream of endlessly inventive extreme metal and searing misanthropy". Kerrang! writer Emily Carter also gave the album a perfect rating, writing that "20 years since their debut, Slipknot are as bold, fearless and exhilarating as ever." Roisin O'Connor of The Independent gushed that "The sheer ambition of We Are Not Your Kind is just as staggering as their seminal record Iowa [and] the dynamic might be even better". Similarly, Consequence of Sound writer Michael Pementel hailed the album as a strong evolution of the band's style, dubbing it "one of the strongest albums in their career". Joe Smith-Engelhardt of Exclaim! described it as "a return to form" following their last two albums, which he called "a tad formulaic". Blabbermouth.net's Jay H. Gorania called it "a shining gem in Slipknot's crown".

Multiple critics hailed lead single "Unsainted" as one of the album's highlights. Bassett called the song "one of the greatest things Slipknot have ever done", while Kory Grow of Rolling Stone described it as "one of the catchiest – and grittiest – songs of the band's career". Anna Smith of Gigwise called the song "a welcome amalgamation of old and new". Other commentators focused on the level of experimentation present on the album. Adam Rees of Metal Hammer highlighted "A Liar's Funeral" and "Not Long for This World" as having "the biggest impact" on the album, while Loudwire contributor Jon Wiederhorn wrote that "With We Are Not Your Kind ... Slipknot have done more than play to their strengths, they've broadly expanded their parameters, taking the band in musical directions that they've previously only hinted at." The band's frontman Corey Taylor also received widespread praise for his lyrics and vocals, described by Carter as "outstanding" and by Pementel as "remarkable".

Very few reviews of We Are Not Your Kind featured major criticisms for the album. Pementel admitted that "To be frank, given all the stylization, the production, and creativity taking place, it's tough to find something wrong with the album," claiming that "fans who pine for the band's early sound may not latch onto We Are Not Your Kind immediately – but even those listeners will likely come around to this exceptional LP." Pitchfork contributor Andy O'Connor admitted that while the album "has more to offer than expected", it is "still sometimes frustratingly short-sighted", claiming that "Slipknot know what works for them and they exploit it to a fault". While hailing the release as "easily the best album Slipknot has produced in 15 years", Sputnikmusic complained of the album's length and its "homogenised stomping rhythm".

=== Accolades ===
==== Year-end rankings ====
Year-end accolades for We Are Not Your Kind
Publication	Accolade	Rank	Ref.
Consequence	Top 30 Metal + Hard Rock Albums of 2019	3	
Exclaim!	10 Best Metal and Hardcore Albums of 2019	7	
The Independent	The 50 Best Albums of 2019	14	
Kerrang!	The 50 Best Albums of 2019	1	
Loudwire	The 50 Best Metal Albums of 2019	–	
Heavy Metal Awards	Best Albums of 2019	1	
NME	The 50 Best Albums of 2019	13	
Revolver	25 Best Albums of 2019	2	
Rolling Stone	10 Best Metal Albums of 2019	1	
Sputnikmusic	Top 50 Albums of 2019	41	
Ultimate Guitar	20 Best Albums of 2019	6	

==== Decade-end rankings ====
Decade-end accolades for We Are Not Your Kind
Publication	Accolade	Rank	Ref.
Consequence	Top 25 Metal Albums of the 2010s	15	
Kerrang!	The 75 Best Albums of the 2010s	8	
Louder Sound	The 50 Best Metal Albums of the 2010s	3	
Loudwire	The 66 Best Metal Albums of the Decade	25	
NME	Best Albums of the Decade: The 2010s	48	
Revolver	25 Best Albums of the 2010s	16	

== Commercial performance ==
We Are Not Your Kind opened at the top ten on more than 20 album charts, debuting atop about 10 (including Australian, Belgian, Canadian, Finnish, Irish, Portuguese, Spanish, British and American charts). The album debuted atop the US Billboard 200 with 118,000 album-equivalent units including 102,000 pure album sales, becoming Slipknot's third consecutive album to reach the country's summit after All Hope Is Gone and .5: The Gray Chapter. Ten previously uncharted album tracks also registered on the Billboard Hot Rock Songs chart – "Nero Forte" at number 11, "Birth of the Cruel" at number 14, "Critical Darling" at number 19, "Orphan" at number 28, "Red Flag" at number 30, "Spiders" at number 34, "A Liar's Funeral" at number 38, "Insert Coin" at number 39, "Death Because of Death" at number 40 and "Not Long for This World" at number 43. The album debuted at number one on the UK Albums Chart, preventing Ed Sheeran's No.6 Collaborations Project from getting a fifth consecutive week at the top spot by selling 31,800 units in its first week, including 25,500 physical copies. This would give the band its first UK number one since 2001's Iowa.

== Track listing ==
All tracks are written by Corey Taylor, Jim Root, and Shawn Crahan, except where noted

No.	Title	Writer(s)	Length
1.	"Insert Coin"		1:38
2.	"Unsainted"	Taylor; Root; Crahan; Alessandro Venturella	4:20
3.	"Birth of the Cruel"		4:35
4.	"Death Because of Death"		1:20
5.	"Nero Forte"	Taylor; Root; Mick Thomson; Crahan; Venturella	5:15
6.	"Critical Darling"	Taylor; Root; Thomson; Crahan	6:25
7.	"A Liar's Funeral"		5:27
8.	"Red Flag"		4:11
9.	"What's Next"		0:53
10.	"Spiders"	Taylor; Root; Thomson; Crahan	4:03
11.	"Orphan"		6:01
12.	"My Pain"		6:48
13.	"Not Long for This World"		6:35
14.	"Solway Firth"		5:56
Total length:			63:29

Japanese edition bonus track
No.	Title	Length
15.	"All Out Life"	5:40
Total length:		69:09

Vinyl release - side one
No.	Title	Length
1.	"Insert Coin"	1:38
2.	"Unsainted"	4:20
3.	"Birth of the Cruel"	4:35
4.	"Death Because of Death"	1:21
5.	"Nero Forte"	5:15
Total length:		17:09

Vinyl release - side two
No.	Title	Length
1.	"Critical Darling"	6:25
2.	"A Liar's Funeral"	5:27
3.	"Red Flag"	4:11
Total length:		16:03

Vinyl release - side three
No.	Title	Length
1.	"What's Next"	0:53
2.	"Spiders"	4:03
3.	"Orphan"	6:01
4.	"My Pain"	6:48
Total length:		17:45

Vinyl release - side four
No.	Title	Length
1.	"Not Long for This World"	6:35
2.	"Solway Firth"	5:56
Total length:		12:31

== Personnel ==
Credits adapted from album's liner notes.

Slipknot

- Corey Taylor – lead and backing vocals
- Mick Thomson – guitars
- Shawn "Clown" Crahan – percussion, backing vocals, art direction, photography
- Craig "133" Jones – samples, media, keyboards
- James Root – guitars
- Sid Wilson – turntables, keyboards
- Alessandro "Vman" Venturella – bass, piano, synthesizer
- Jay Weinberg – drums

Additional musicians

- Angel City Chorale – choral vocals on "Unsainted"
- Chris Fehn – percussion and backing vocals on "All Out Life"
- Kat Primeau – additional vocals on "Death Because of Death"

Additional personnel

- Slipknot – production
- Greg Fidelman – production, engineering
- Greg Gordon – engineering
- Sara Killion – engineering
- Paul Fig – engineering
- Bo Bodnar – engineering assistance
- Chaz Sexton – engineering assistance
- Joe Barresi – mixing
- Jun Murakawa – mixing assistance
- Dan Monti – editing
- Bob Ludwig – mastering
- Michael Boland – design
- Alexandria Crahan-Conway – band photography

== Charts ==
=== Weekly charts ===
Weekly chart performance for We Are Not Your Kind
Chart (2019)	Peak position
Australian Albums (ARIA)	1
Austrian Albums (Ö3 Austria)	3
Belgian Albums (Ultratop Flanders)	1
Belgian Albums (Ultratop Wallonia)	1
Canadian Albums (Billboard)	1
Czech Albums (ČNS IFPI)	4
Danish Albums (Hitlisten)	7
Dutch Albums (Album Top 100)	2
Finnish Albums (Suomen virallinen lista)	1
French Albums (SNEP)	2
German Albums (Offizielle Top 100)	2
Hungarian Albums (MAHASZ)	2
Irish Albums (IRMA)	1
Italian Albums (FIMI)	3
Japan Hot Albums (Billboard Japan)	8
Japanese Albums (Oricon)	9
Latvian Albums (LAIPA)	6
Lithuanian Albums (AGATA)	9
Mexican Albums (AMPROFON)	1
New Zealand Albums (RMNZ)	2
Norwegian Albums (VG-lista)	3
Norwegian Vinyl Albums (VG-lista)	1
Polish Albums (ZPAV)	3
Portuguese Albums (AFP)	1
Scottish Albums (Official Charts)	1
Spanish Albums (Promusicae)	1
Swedish Albums (Sverigetopplistan)	4
Swiss Albums (Schweizer Hitparade)	2
UK Albums (Official Charts)	1
UK Rock & Metal Albums (Official Charts)	1
US Billboard 200	1
US Top Rock Albums (Billboard)	1

=== Year-end charts ===
Year-end chart performance for We Are Not Your Kind
Chart (2019)	Position
Australian Albums (ARIA)	49
Austrian Albums (Ö3 Austria)	55
Belgian Albums (Ultratop Flanders)	73
Belgian Albums (Ultratop Wallonia)	146
French Albums (SNEP)	187
German Albums (Offizielle Top 100)	43
Mexican Albums (AMPROFON)	94
Swiss Albums (Schweizer Hitparade)	66
US Top Album Sales (Billboard)	32
US Top Current Album Sales (Billboard)	28
US Top Rock Albums (Billboard)	37
US Top Hard Rock Albums (Billboard)	14

== Certifications ==
Certifications for We Are Not Your Kind
Region	Certification	Certified units/sales
Austria (IFPI Austria)	Gold	7,500^{‡}
Canada (Music Canada)	Gold	40,000^{‡}
New Zealand (RMNZ)	Gold	7,500^{‡}
United Kingdom (BPI)	Gold	100,000^{‡}
^{‡} Sales+streaming figures based on certification alone.
