= Dirty Little Rabbits =

American alternative rock band

- Origin: Johnston, Iowa, U.S.
- Genres: Alternative rock; indie rock; psychedelic rock; dark cabaret
- Years active: 2007–2010
- Label: The End
- Past members: Ty Fury; Shawn Crahan; Michael Pfaff; Jeff Karnowski; Stella Katsoudas; Ryan Martin
- Website: dirtylittlerabbits.com

Dirty Little Rabbits was an American alternative rock band formed in 2007 in Johnston, Iowa. They are often referred to as a side project of Shawn Crahan, a member and founder of heavy metal band Slipknot. The band has not been active since 2010. Also known as the side project of Stella Soleil of Sister Soleil fame.

== History ==
In 2007, fellow Slipknot band member Sid Wilson introduced Shawn Crahan to future Slipknot member Michael Pfaff, and along with a few other musicians, they had a jam session together. Crahan himself said that during the session he could only focus on Pfaff and how they both played together, explaining that "it was the way he was throwing his shapes, to my shapes." Shortly after meeting with Pfaff, Crahan introduced guitarist Ty Fury to the project. Crahan had previously worked with Fury on a band he was a part of in Denver, but recruited him for Dirty Little Rabbits. Around the same time, Pfaff brought bassist Jeff Karnowski in to the band. After this, they realized they would need a vocalist. After going through a couple of other singers, Crahan recruited Stella Katsoudas, who was living in Los Angeles at the time. Crahan and Katsoudas had known each other for "a long, long time" and had agreed to meet up "just as friends," but Crahan revealed upon meeting that he wanted her to join the band.

After writing together and developing the band, they began performing shows in the midwest of the United States. On August 15, 2007 they released their debut EP, Breeding independently. Following this, through August and September they supported Stone Sour on a tour of the United States. Dirty Little Rabbits continued to tour in 2008, with their own shows through February and May and in support of Mindless Self Indulgence in June. Through July and August drummer Crahan was touring with Slipknot as part of the Mayhem Festival and as a result Dirty Little Rabbits temporarily went on hiatus. After signing with The End Records, Dirty Little Rabbits began working on an album at Sound Farm Studio in September while Crahan's other band Slipknot took a break from touring. They released their second EP; Simon on January 27, 2009, and they planned to release a full-length album in April.

On July 31, 2009 Dirty Little Rabbits were scheduled to perform their first show outside of the US with Lacuna Coil in Ireland, and then the United Kingdom, as well as appearing at the Sonisphere Festival in August. However, the band canceled both appearances due to exhaustion. Crahan explained, "After weeks of going all over the world and playing some of the biggest shows of my career [(with his other band Slipknot)], and now being in the home stretch on completing the Dirty Little Rabbits debut album, I'm just mentally and physically drained."

Dirty Little Rabbits released their self-titled debut album on July 6, 2010 via The End Records. Also in 2010, Ryan Martin joined the band, replacing Ty Fury as guitarist. The band performed at the Vans Warped Tour from July 20 to August 5 that summer. The played their last show on 23rd October 2010.

== Musical style ==
Dirty Little Rabbits' musical style is considerably different from Crahan's most notable band, Slipknot. Crahan explained in an interview in 2008 that he is an "alternative person in art and music" and that he did not grow up obsessed with metal. He went on to explain that other members of Slipknot are obsessed with metal and that he "went with it" because it was different for him and he could introduce them to something different. He describes Dirty Little Rabbits as the band he has been waiting his whole life for. He made a particular point about the fact that they have a female singer and that he has always wanted to be in a band with a female singer, because he wants to "represent the whole world, male and female."

== Band members ==
=== Final members ===
- Shawn Crahan – drums (2007–2010)
- Michael Pfaff – keyboards, organ (2007–2010)
- Jeff Karnowski – bass (2007–2010)
- Stella Katsoudas – vocals (2007–2010)
- Ryan Martin – guitars (2010)

=== Former members ===
- Ty Fury – guitars (2007–2010)

== Discography ==
Studio albums

- Dirty Little Rabbits (2010)

EPs

- Breeding (2007)
- Simon (2009)
