= The Envy Corps =

American rock band

- Origin: Ames, Iowa, U.S.
- Genres: Alternative rock, indie rock, experimental rock
- Years active: 2001–2023
- Labels: Bi-Fi Records, Vertigo, self-released
- Past members: Luke Pettipoole; Peter Bovenmeyer; Derek Powers; David Yoshimura; Scott Yoshimura; Brandon Darner; Micah Natera
- Website: theenvycorps.com

The Envy Corps was an American alternative rock band originally from Ames, Iowa. Discovered on Myspace by Universal Music imprint Vertigo, the band was transplanted into the UK indie dance/rock scene of the late 2000s. Future independent releases found the band experimenting with sounds inspired by Radiohead, Talk Talk, Portishead, and Bjork in relative obscurity outside their home state of Iowa.

In a review of their critically acclaimed 2011 release It Culls You, Christina Smart of Examiner.com called the Envy Corps "the best band you've never heard of."

== History ==
=== Formation and Soviet Reunion (2001–2004) ===
The Envy Corps were formed in October 2001 by Luke Pettipoole, and originally included Pettipoole on guitar and vocals, Derek Powers on drums, and Peter Bovenmyer on bass. In 2003, the band added second guitarist David Yoshimura, and by late 2004 had released Soviet Reunion, their first album to little acclaim. Soon thereafter, the lineup shuffled. Yoshimura assumed bass duties, his brother Scott took over the drumkit, and former To My Surprise frontman Brandon Darner joined on lead guitar.

The band recorded its first releases at the Bi-Fi Records studio in Ames, Iowa. Luke Pettipoole played most of the instruments on Soviet Reunion and early singles and Ep's.

=== Dwell (2005–2009) ===
The band spent 2005 working feverishly on the first fruits of the new lineup. I Will Write You Love Letters If You Tell Me To EP was self-released in April 2006. The album garnered them increased attention and an extended stay on the CMJ Top 200 chart, as well as an opening slot for The Killers on Sam's Town Tour. Based on the success of the EP, the band signed with the Mercury Records imprint Vertigo. In March 2007, the Story Problem EP was released on iTunes and double 7" in the UK, culling four tracks from Love Letters and serving as a teaser for the upcoming album. The band spent several months in 2007 working on their major label debut, Dwell, at a studio - Sound Farm Studio & Recording Environment - tucked away in the remote farmland of their home state, choosing then to mix the record in the London borough of Brixton.

Dwell was originally slated for release for September 2007, but the onstage stroke of guitarist Darner at a London club show in August delayed the album. Within two weeks, Darner rejoined his comrades on their UK tour with Editors, but immediately thereafter the band retreated to Iowa to allow Darner to further recover. At the end of 2007, bassist David Yoshimura left the band and moved to Japan. Dwell was eventually released in the UK on April 28, 2008, and digitally in the US on July 8, 2008.

The song "Story Problem" was featured on the soundtrack of the British romantic comedy film Run, Fatboy, Run starring Simon Pegg.

=== Kid Gloves EP and It Culls You (2009–2019) ===
The Envy Corps were dropped from Vertigo Records in late 2008, and soon thereafter added live guitarist/keyboardist Micah Natera as a permanent member. Eager to prove themselves creatively, in February and March 2009, the band recorded material for a new EP entitled Kid Gloves which was released June 9, 2009 and included the single "Screen Test". In June 2010, the band began pre-production on their proper follow-up. Sessions with Omaha engineer A. J. Mogis at ARC Studios resulted in a full-length entitled It Culls You, which featured new songs such as "Make It Stop", "Ms. Hospital Corners", "Fools (How I Survived You & Even Laughed)" and "Cmd + Q".

The band's music was featured on Entourage in July 2010.

In October 2011, The Envy Corps began streaming It Culls You, the much-anticipated follow-up to 2008's Dwell, from their website. The digital release was without much fanfare: in an interview, guitarist Brandon Darner said that he was acutely conscious of "PR schemes" that generate "artificial excitement," and he wanted fans to discover the record on their own time and "let it sink in for a while."

Upon its physical release, the album was a critical success. While a few critics disparaged the album for being "forgettable," many critics praised the album for its sonic ingenuity and commended the band for "[perfecting] the melodic rock they are best known for." Mike Antonich noted that the album warrants repeated listens, writing that the album's "brilliance has only grown with each repeated play." Likewise, Joel Frieders called the album "gorgeous" named it one of his top 10 albums of 2011. Moreover, expressing a nearly ubiquitous critical sentiment, Christina Smart wrote that the album "deserves to be on everyone's [top 10] list."

The band took part in the inaugural Hinterland Music Festival on July 31, 2015, in central Iowa. On May 28, 2017, the band officially announced through their Facebook page that they had begun working on new music.

=== Born in Fog (2019–2023) ===
On March 26, 2019, the band debuted their first new music in 8 years, a single entitled "Weather Baby", and announced they would break a four year performance hiatus with an appearance at 2019's 80-35 Festival in Des Moines, Iowa. On April 5 of that same year, a second single, "Sour Patch" was released. On February 22, 2022, the band announced via Twitter that their fourth album would be titled Born in Fog and would arrive on May 27, 2022. On April 1, 2022, the album was made available on Bandcamp, and it was officially released to all streaming platforms on May 27, 2022. The band played their final show at the Outlandia Music Festival in Bellevue, Nebraska on August 11, 2023.

== Discography ==
=== Albums ===
- Soviet Reunion (2004, Bi-Fi Records)
- Dwell (2008, Vertigo Records)
- It Culls You (2011, self-released)
- Born in Fog (2022, self–released)

=== EPs ===
- Humble Hero/Lurking In the Shadows (2002, Bi-Fi Records)
- Gregory Rumes (2003, Bi-Fi Records)
- I Will Write You Love Letters If You Tell Me To (2006, self-released)
- Story Problem (2007, Vertigo Records)
- Kid Gloves (2009, self-released)

=== Singles ===
- "Wires & Wool" (2007, Vertigo Records)
- "Rhinemaidens" (2007, Vertigo Records)
- "Story Problem" (2008, Vertigo Records)
- "Weather Baby" (2019, self-released)
- "Sour Patch" (2019, self-released)
- "Fraidy Cat/Good Night Kitty" (2022, self-released)

=== Other ===
- Run Fatboy Run Soundtrack (2007)

=== Unreleased songs ===
- "Yellow Streak" (2011)
