= Breeding (EP) =

EP by Dirty Little Rabbits
- Released: August 15, 2007
- Recorded: 2007 at Are Studios in Omaha, Nebraska
- Genre: Indie
- Length: 11:01
- Label: Sopra Evil
- Producer: Dirty Little Rabbits

Dirty Little Rabbits chronology
Breeding (2007)	Simon (2009)

Breeding is the first EP by American indie band Dirty Little Rabbits. It was released on August 15, 2007, for sale exclusively through the New York-based record shop Looney Tunes.

== Track listing ==
1. "Hello" – 4:10
2. "Hero Poet" – 3:03
3. "I'm So Beautiful" – 3:48

== Personnel ==
- Stella Katsoudas – vocals
- Ty Fyhrie – guitars
- Jeff Karnowski – bass
- Shawn Crahan – drums, photography
- Michael Pfaff – keyboards
- A. Jonathan Ward – assistant producer
- Judy Long – illustration
- Scott Kaven – photography
