= Shawn Crahan =

American percussionist (born 1969)

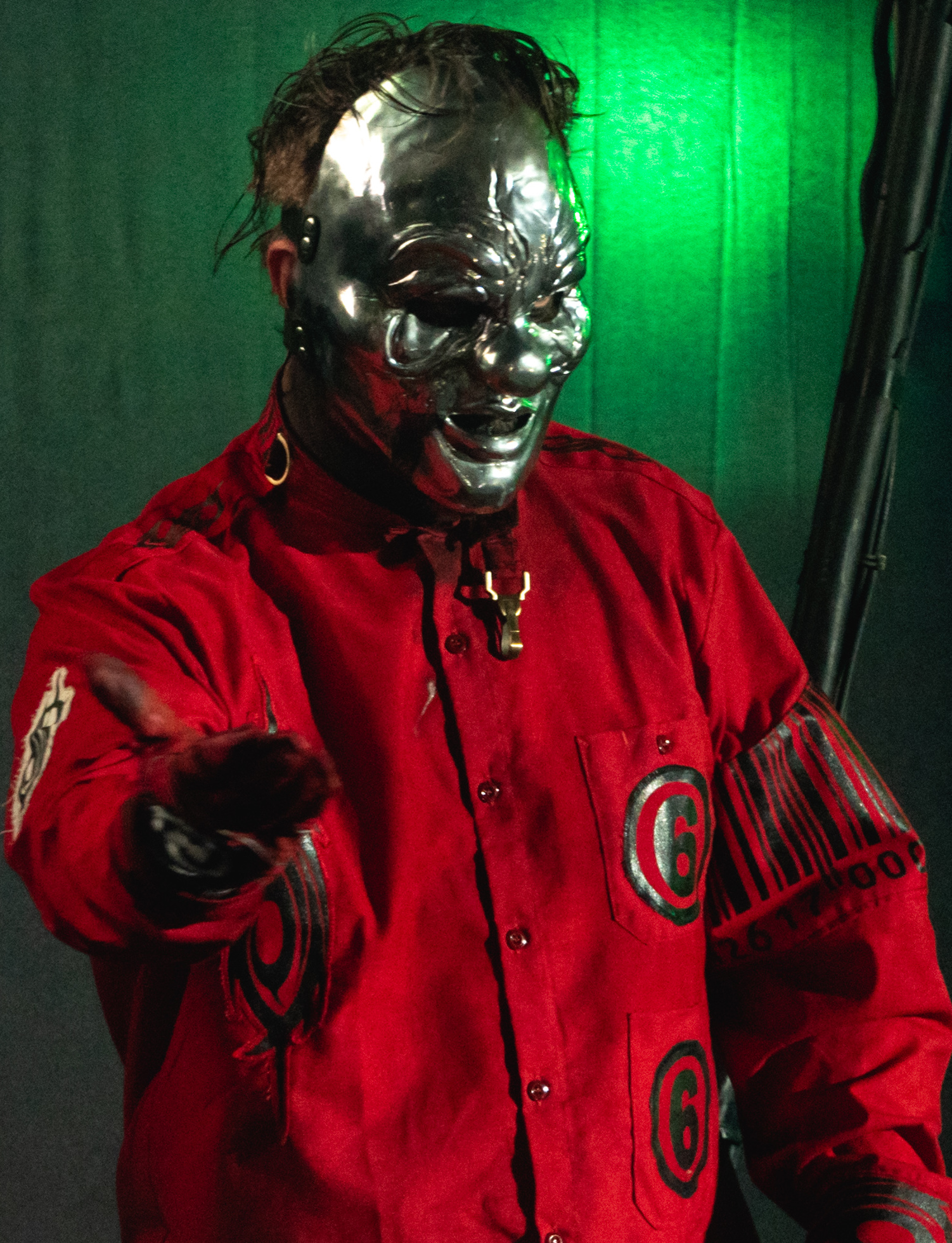
- Crahan performing with Slipknot in 2019

Background information
- Also known as: Clown; #6; Kong
- Born: Michael Shawn Crahan; September 24, 1969 (age 56)
- Genres: Alternative metal; nu metal
- Occupations: Musician; director
- Instruments: Percussion; drums; vocals
- Years active: 1992–present
- Member of: Slipknot
- Formerly of: To My Surprise; Dirty Little Rabbits
- Website: theclown.com

Michael Shawn Crahan (born September 24, 1969), more commonly known by his stage persona "Clown", is an American musician. He is the co-founder and percussionist of the alternative metal band Slipknot, in which he is designated #6. He helped form Slipknot in 1995 alongside bassist Paul Gray and former vocalist Anders Colsefni. Crahan is the longest-serving member of the band, and also has extensive involvement with Slipknot's media production and music videos. Outside Slipknot, Crahan had two side project bands called To My Surprise and Dirty Little Rabbits. Aside from his musical activity, he also directed the 2016 action thriller film Officer Downe.

== Personal life ==
Crahan married his wife Chantel in June 1993, in Des Moines, Iowa. They had four children together, the second youngest of whom died in 2019 at the age of 22. Crahan is also a filmographer and photographer, having published a Slipknot photo album "The Apocalyptic Nightmare" in 2012. In 2012, he made his debut acting appearance in the film The Devil's Carnival. Crahan's son, Simon, currently plays drums in Vended, a band also containing fellow Slipknot member Corey Taylor's son Griffin.

== Career ==
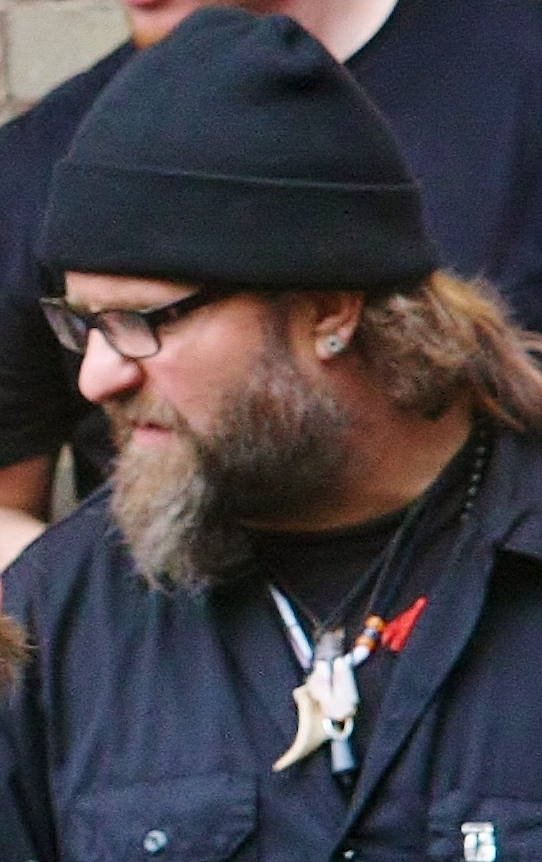
Crahan in 2011

=== With Slipknot ===
In 1995, Crahan formed a metal band known as the Pale Ones with fellow musician Paul Gray, which featured himself as the band's drummer. Wanting to expand the band's percussion section, Crahan brought in Joey Jordison to fill in as drummer while Crahan's efforts were focused on percussion. The lead vocalist, Anders Colsefni, played a second percussion kit, which gave the band a layered, distinctive drum sound. In 1996, they released a song known as "Slipknot", and through Joey's suggestion, the band changed their name to Slipknot and released their first official album. This album would later become known to the band as their demo. Crahan felt that the original vocalist for Slipknot was too guttural, and was the primary reason for Slipknot's inability to get a record deal. He brought in Corey Taylor from another local band called Stone Sour, whose vocals were more melodic. Slipknot got a record deal a couple years later and released their first official album in 1999. Slipknot gained major notability the same year by touring with Ozzfest. In Slipknot's early years, Crahan brought several dead cow heads on stage.

As well as lending his percussion talents to the band, Crahan has also sung backing vocals on a number of songs Slipknot has both recorded and performed live. He also wrote the original draft of "Tattered & Torn", which originally appeared on the band's first album, Mate. Feed. Kill. Repeat. which featured the original singer of Slipknot before Corey Taylor was brought in as a replacement. A second version of "Tattered & Torn" was released on their self-titled album. He also acted as director for, and assembled Slipknot's 2005 DVD, Voliminal: Inside the Nine, while the band was on hiatus.

Outside Slipknot, Crahan also performed with To My Surprise, recording guitar and vocals for the band's self-titled debut album. The band received little interest due to their album being released amidst the success of Slipknot members Corey Taylor, Jim Root and Joey Jordison's side projects, Stone Sour and the Murderdolls, respectively. To My Surprise was later dropped by Roadrunner Records. In 2007, Crahan began performing as drummer for Dirty Little Rabbits. The band was a supporting act for Stone Sour during their North American tour in Summer 2007, and have released one EP, titled Breeding. They have since signed a deal with The End Records as of November 2008.

In 2009, he contributed to Bring Me the Horizon's remix album, Suicide Season: Cut Up!, by remixing the track "Sleep With One Eye Open". Also in 2009, Shawn remixed Coheed and Cambria's "Welcome Home" and a Suicide Silence track on their Wake Up EP entitled "Wake Up (Clown of Slipknot Remix)". In 2010, he contributed to Escape the Fate's This War Is Ours deluxe edition, by remixing the track "This War Is Ours (The Guillotine Part II)," and in 2011, he remixed "Angels of Clarity" for Dead by April on their compilation album "Stronger." Crahan has confirmed the formation of a brand-new side project called The Black Dots of Death who released their debut studio album Ever Since We Were Children on March 28, 2011. He is the director of many of Slipknot's music videos, DVDs and other artistic projects. He also directed the "We Are" videoclip from the band Hollywood Undead

Crahan generally wears clown-style masks while performing with Slipknot; however, on occasion, when performing the band's song "Vermilion", all band members will wear their own death masks instead.

He also featured as the carny "Tamer" in The Devil's Carnival, a full-length feature film directed by Darren Lynn Bousman which was screened on their tour beginning in April 2012.

=== Influence on Slipknot ===
Crahan has been credited with several things that Slipknot is known for, such as their large percussion section and their masks. Crahan began wearing a clown mask to rehearsals when the band was still fairly unknown, spawning the mask theme that the band is known for today.

Crahan has had several masks throughout his career with Slipknot, all of which are clown themed except for his "death mask", which was used in the video for the song "Vermilion". Crahan's earliest known mask and perhaps his most referenced one is one that he used during Slipknot's earliest self-titled album which is a happy looking clown mask, balding with long orange hair.

=== Film career ===
In June 2016, Crahan made his directing debut with the film Officer Downe based on the graphic novel Officer Downe written by Joe Casey and illustrated by Chris Burnham. Crahan also directed the music video for the song "A-M-E-R-I-C-A" by Motionless in White and "We Are" by Hollywood Undead.

=== Production work ===
Crahan has also participated in several other music-related endeavours, and acted as executive producer on L.D. 50 by Mudvayne and the self-titled debut album by downthesun. He was also briefly the owner of a short-lived record label, Maggot Recordings (also known as Maggot Corps.), which existed briefly between 2001 and 2002 as a subsidiary of London-Sire Records, a Warner Music Group label. The label's only signed act was downthesun. The label was rendered defunct following the collapse of London-Sire in January 2002. Downthesun's self-titled debut album, which was scheduled to be released in February 2002 through the label, was eventually released through Roadrunner in October 2002.

Crahan later founded Big Orange Clown Records, a vanity label within Sanctuary Records, which has so far signed the metalcore band Gizmachi. He also served as producer for their sole full-length album, The Imbuing.

== Discography ==
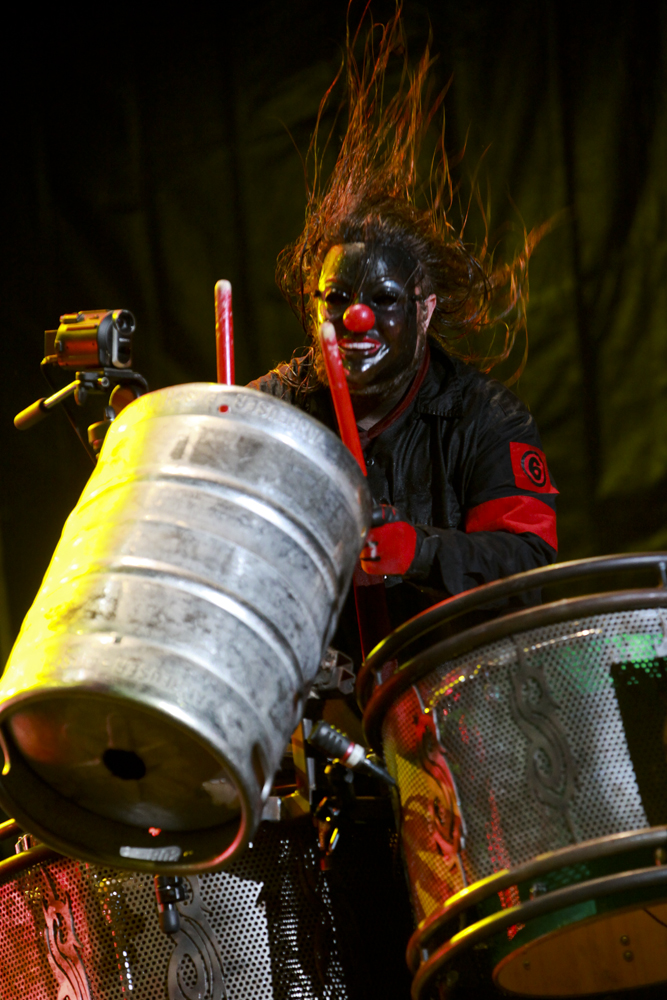
Crahan performing with Slipknot in 2009

=== with Slipknot ===
- Mate. Feed. Kill. Repeat. (1996)
- Slipknot (1999)
- Iowa (2001)
- Vol. 3: (The Subliminal Verses) (2004)
- All Hope Is Gone (2008)
- .5: The Gray Chapter (2014)
- We Are Not Your Kind (2019)
- The End, So Far (2022)

=== with To My Surprise ===
- To My Surprise (2003)

=== with Dirty Little Rabbits ===
- Breeding (2007)
- Simon (2009)
- Dirty Little Rabbits (2010)

=== with the Black Dots of Death ===
- 2011: Ever Since We Were Children

=== with Look Outside Your Window ===
- 2026: Look Outside Your Window

=== Guest appearances and remixes ===
- American Head Charge – "Just So You Know" (Clown #6 from Slipknot Remix) (2002)
- Mindless Self Indulgence – "Pay for It" (The Son of a Clown Remix) (2008)
- Darren Smith & Terrance Zdunich – "Repo! The Genetic Opera" (2008)
- Marilyn Manson – "Arma-goddamn-motherfuckin-geddon" (Clown/Slipknot Fuck the God Damn TV and Radio Remix) (2009)
- Coheed and Cambria – "Clown's Welcome Home" (Shawn Crahan Remix) (2009)
- Dead by April – "Angels of Clarity" (Shawn 'Clown' Crahan Remix) (2009)
- Bring Me the Horizon – "Sleep With One Eye Open" (Clown Remix) (2009)
- Suicide Silence – "Wake Up" (Clown of Slipknot Remix) (2010)
- Escape the Fate – "This War Is Ours (The Guillotine Part II)" (This War Is Mine) (2010)
- Hesta Prynn – "Pepper" (2010)
- On a Pale Horse – "Walks With Death" (Clown / M Shawn Crahan Remix), "Steps" (Clown / M Shawn Crahan Remix) (2011)
- Austra – "Beat and the Pulse" (Clown Remix) (2011)
- Free Dominguez – "Darkest Rivers" (Psychosis Industries: M. Shawn Crahan and Kyle Sherrod "Below the Surface" Remix) (2013)
- Hooverphonic – "Shake The Disease" (Shawn "Clown" From Slipknot Edit The Shake Remix) (2013)

== Produced albums ==
- 2000: L.D. 50 – Mudvayne
- 2001: Invitation to the Dance – 40 Below Summer
- 2002: Downthesun – Downthesun
- 2003: To My Surprise – To My Surprise
- 2005: The Imbuing – Gizmachi
- 2008: Dirtfedd – Dirtfedd

== Filmography ==
- 1999: Welcome to Our Neighborhood
- 2002: Disasterpieces
- 2002: Rollerball
- 2006: Voliminal: Inside the Nine
- 2008: Repo: The Genetic Opera – percussion
- 2008: Nine: The Making of "All Hope Is Gone"
- 2010: (sic)nesses
- 2011: Goat
- 2012: The Devil's Carnival – The Tamer
- 2012: A Beary Scary Movie
- 2012: We Are (Hollywood Undead music video)
- 2013: A M E R I C A (Motionless in White music video)
- 2015: “The Vatican Tapes” - cameo
- 2016: Officer Downe – director
- 2017: Day of the Gusano – director
- 2020: Pollution – director (short film)

Preceded by none	Slipknot drummer 1995	Succeeded by Joey Jordison

Preceded by Anders Colsefni	Slipknot percussionist 1995–present	Succeeded by none
