= The Mad Capsule Markets discography =

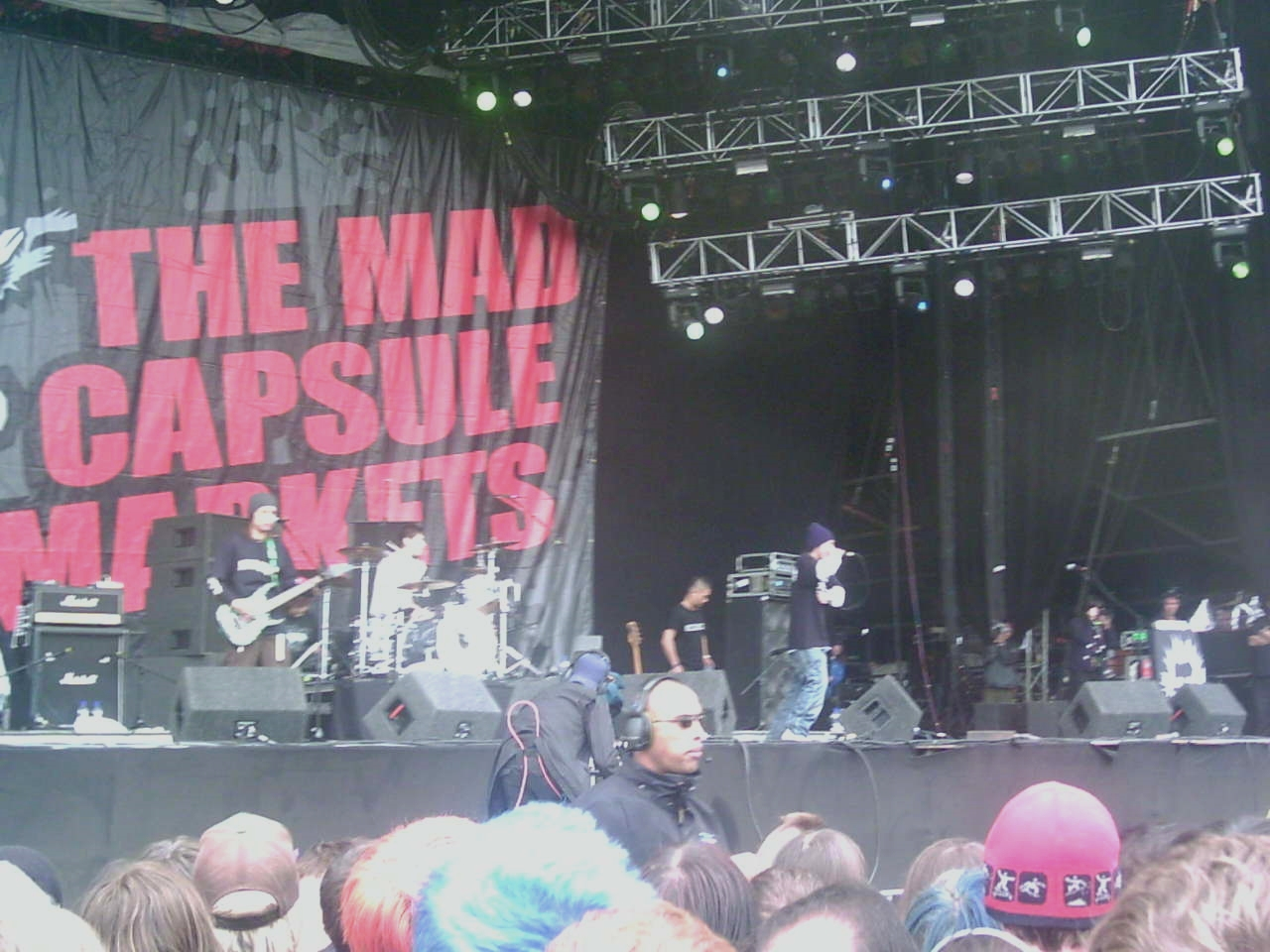
- The Mad Capsule Markets performing at Download Festival 2005
- Studio albums: 10
- Extended plays: 2
- Live albums: 1
- Compilation albums: 3
- Singles: 20

Worldwide, the Japanese rock band The Mad Capsule Markets released 10 studio albums, 1 live album, 3 compilation albums, 1 extended play (EP) and 20 singles. The Band's early works were released on Insect Noise before signing with major label Victor Entertainment from 1990 to 2005. In 2005 the band signed to Sony Music Japan, releasing two greatest hits collections.

== Albums ==
=== Studio albums ===
List of studio albums, with selected chart positions and certifications
Title	Album details	Peak chart position				Certifications
Title	Album details	JPN	UK	UK Indie	UK Rock	Certifications
Humanity	Released: October 1, 1990; Label: Insect Noise; Format: CD, download	—	—	—	—	
P.O.P	Released: November 21, 1991; Label: Victor Entertainment; Format: CD, download	—	—	—	—	
Speak!!!!	Released: November 21, 1992; Label: Victor Entertainment; Format: CD, download	—	—	—	—	
Mix-ism	Released: January 21, 1994; Label: Victor Entertainment; Format: CD, download	27	—	—	—	
Park	Released: October 21, 1994; Label: Victor Entertainment; Format: CD, download	19	—	—	—	
4 Plugs	Released: January 24, 1996; Label: Victor Entertainment; Format: CD, download, LP	10	—	—	—	
Digidogheadlock	Released: September 26, 1997; Label: Victor Entertainment; Format: CD, download, LP	14	—	—	—	
Osc-Dis	Released: August 25, 1999; Label: Victor Entertainment; Format: CD, download, LP	9	—	—	—	
010	Released: July 11, 2001; Label: Victor Entertainment; Format: CD, download, LP	5	120	10	11	
CiSTm K0nFLiqT...	Released: March 31, 2004; Label: Victor Entertainment; Format: CD, download, LP	7	158	21	14	RIAJ: Gold
"—" denotes a recording that did not chart or was not released in that territory.

=== Compilations ===
List of studio albums, with selected chart positions and certifications
Title	Album details	Peak chart position
Title	Album details	JPN
The Mad Capsule Market's	Released: September 4, 1996; Label: Victor Entertainment; Format: CD	10
The Mad Capsule Markets 1990–1996	Released: December 1, 2004; Label: Victor Entertainment; Format: CD	21
The Mad Capsule Markets 1997–2004	Released: December 1, 2004; Label: Victor Entertainment; Format: CD	19
"—" denotes a recording that did not chart or was not released in that territory.

=== Live albums ===
List of studio albums, with selected chart positions and certifications
Title	Album details	Peak chart position
Title	Album details	JPN
020120	Released: July 10, 2002; Label: Victor Entertainment; Format: CD, DVD	14
"—" denotes a recording that did not chart or was not released in that territory.

== Extended Plays ==
Title	Release date	Label
Capsule Soup	1992	Victor/Invitation
Gichi-Early Singles Collection	1994	Victor/Invitation

== Singles ==
Title	Year	Peak chart positions				Album
Title	Year	JPN	UK	UK Indie	UK Rock	Album
"Government Wall"	1990	—	—	—	—	Speak!!!!
"Gichi" (ギチ)	1991	—	—	—	—	P.O.P.
"Ayatsuri Ningyou" (あやつり人形)	1991	—	—	—	—	P.O.P.
"Karakuri No Soko" (カラクリの底)	1991	—	—	—	—	P.O.P.
"Eject-Out"	1994	50	—	—	—	Non-album single
"Kami-Uta" (神歌)	1995	—	—	—	—	4 Plugs
"Walk!"	1996	—	—	—	—	4 Plugs
"Systematic"	1997	40	—	—	—	Digidogheadlock
"Creature"	1997	—	—	—	—	Digidogheadlock
"Crash Pow"	1997	—	—	—	—	Digidogheadlock
"Midi Surf"	1998	19	—	—	—	Osc-Dis
"Pulse"	1999	29	196	—	—	Osc-Dis
"Good Girl"	2000	49	—	—	—	Osc-Dis
"Chaos Step"	2001	9	—	—	—	010
"Gaga Life"	2001	5	158	—	27	010
"Fly High" (feat. Dengeki Network)	2002	4	147	—	16	010
"Tribe"	2002	—	131	—	14	Osc-Dis
"All the Time in Sunny Beach"	2002	—	—	—	35	Osc-Dis
"Scary - Delete Streamin' Freq. From Fear Side"	2004	7	100	11	34	CiSTm K0nFLiqT...
"Happy Ride"	2005	—	146	—	—	CiSTm K0nFLiqT...
"—" denotes a recording that did not chart or was not released in that territory.

== Videos ==
- Gichi Video 1991/08/21
- Reading S.S.M. video 1994/06/22
- MCM Video 1995/03/24
- 4 Plugs Video 1996/08/07
- Osc Dis Video 2001/01/21
- Pulse US DVD Promo 2001/08/??, US
- Osc-Dis US DVD 2001/10/30, US
- Pulse UK DVD 2001/12/03, UK
- Osc Dis DVD 2002/01/23
- 020120 DVD 2002/10/26
- 1990-1996 DVD 2005/03/16
- 1997-2004 DVD 2005/03/16
