= Death Note original soundtracks =

This article lists the soundtracks attributed to the Death Note franchise.

== Anime soundtracks ==
=== Death Note Original Soundtrack ===
Death Note Original Soundtrack

Soundtrack album by Yoshihisa Hirano Hideki Taniuchi
- Released: December 21, 2006
- Genre: Anime soundtrack
- Length: 1 hour, 13 minutes
- Label: VAP
- Producers: Kazunari Sengoku; Makoto Saito; Tokuwa Nagae

The Death Note Original Soundtrack for the anime adaptation was first released in Japan on December 21, 2006, and was published by VAP. It contains music from the series, composed by Yoshihisa Hirano and Hideki Taniuchi, with the first opening and ending themes sung by the Japanese band Nightmare in the TV size format. The tracks 1–18 were composed and arranged by Hideki Taniuchi, while the tracks 19-28 were composed and arranged by Yoshihisa Hirano. The first press' slipcover featured glow-in-the-dark artwork.

==== Track listing ====
1. "Death Note"
2. "Incident" (事件, Jiken)
3. "Light's Theme" (ライトのテーマ, Raito no Tēma)
4. "L's Theme" (Lのテーマ, L no Tēma)
5. "Tension" (緊張, Kinchō)
6. "Horror" (戦慄, Senritsu)
7. "Loneliness" (孤独, Kodoku)
8. "Resonance" (共鳴, Kyōmei)
9. "Anticipation" (期待, Kitai)
10. "The Kira Special Investigation Unit" (特捜キラ班, Tokusō Kira Han)
11. "L's Theme B" (LのテーマB, L no Tēma B)
12. "Hesitation" (逡巡, Shunjun)
13. "Pursuit" (追跡, Tsuiseki)
14. "L's Companions" (Lの仲間, L no Nakama)
15. "Special Investigation" (特捜, Tokusō)
16. "Shinigami World" (死神界, Shinigamikai)
17. "Boredom" (退屈, Taikutsu)
18. "Rem" (レム, Remu)
19. "Death Note Theme"
20. "Kyrie"
21. "Domine Kira"
22. "Teleology of Death"
23. "Low of Solipsism"
24. "Requiem"
25. "Immanence"
26. "Dirge"
27. "Light Lights up Light"
28. "Alert"
29. "the WORLD (TV Size)" (the WORLD ～TVサイズ～, the WORLD ~Terebi Saizu~) / Nightmare
30. "Alumina (TV Size)" (アルミナ ～TVサイズ～, Arumina ~Terebi Saizu~) / Nightmare

=== Death Note Original Soundtrack II ===
Death Note Original Soundtrack II

Soundtrack album by Yoshihisa Hirano Hideki Taniuchi
- Released: March 21, 2007
- Genre: Anime soundtrack
- Length: 1 hour, 11 minutes
- Label: VAP
- Producers: Kazunari Sengoku; Makoto Saito; Tokuwa Nagae

The Death Note Original Soundtrack II for the anime adaptation was first released in Japan on March 21, 2007, and was published by VAP. It contains music from the series, composed by Hideki Taniuchi and Yoshihisa Hirano. It also features the new opening and closing themes by Maximum the Hormone in the TV size format. The tracks 1–8 were composed and arranged by Yoshihisa Hirano, while the tracks 9-28 were composed and arranged by Hideki Taniuchi. Note that, while track 19 has the same title as track 14 on the first OST, they are in fact two different songs. Strangely, track 5 is identical to the first OST's track 28, although they have different titles. The first press' slipcover featured glow-in-the-dark artwork.

==== Track listing ====
1. "Kyrie II"
2. "Semblance of Dualism"
3. "Low of Solipsism II"
4. "Death Note Theme ～instrumental～"
5. "Tactics of the Absolute"
6. "Kyrie for orchestra"
7. "Air"
8. "Light Lights up Light for piano"
9. "Black Light" (黒いライト, Kuroi Raito)
10. "L's Wall" (Lの壁, L no Kabe)
11. "Throb" (鼓動, Kodō)
12. "Anxiety" (不安, Fuan)
13. "Anxious Feelings" (緊張感, Kinchō Kan)
14. "Higuchi" (火口, Higuchi)
15. "Horror B" (戦慄B, Senritsu B)
16. "The Yotsuba Murder Conference Room" (ヨツバ殺しの会議室, Yotsuba Koroshi no Kaigishitsu)
17. "Hatred" (怒り, Ikari)
18. "Shinigami World B" (死神界B, Shinigamikai B)
19. "L's Companions" (Lの仲間, L no Nakama)
20. "Misa's Theme A" (ミサのテーマA, Misa no Tēma A)
21. "Misa's Theme B" (ミサのテーマB, Misa no Tēma B)
22. "Intro" (イントロ, Intoro)
23. "Sakura TV" (サクラTV, Sakura TV)
24. "Reasoning" (推理, Suiri)
25. "Suspicious" (怪しげ, Ayashige)
26. "The Yotsuba Group" (ヨツバグループ, Yotsuba Gurūpu)
27. "Secret" (秘密, Himitsu)
28. "Clock Ticking" (時計の針の音, Tokei no Hari no Oto)
29. "What's up, people?! (TV Size)" (What's up, people?! ～TVサイズ～, What's up, people?! ~Terebi Saizu~) / Maximum the Hormone
30. "Zetsubou Billy (TV Size)" (絶望ビリー～TVサイズ～, Zetsubō Birii ~Terebi Saizu~; lit."Despair Billy" ~TV Size~") / Maximum the Hormone

=== Death Note Original Soundtrack III ===
Death Note Original Soundtrack III

Soundtrack album by Yoshihisa Hirano Hideki Taniuchi
- Released: June 27, 2007
- Genre: Anime soundtrack
- Length: 1 hour, 4 minutes
- Label: VAP
- Producers: Kazunari Sengoku; Makoto Saito; Tokuwa Nagae

Death Note Original Soundtrack III, released on June 27, 2007 (Japan), is the third soundtrack album for the anime series Death Note. The music was created by composer and musician Hideki Taniuchi and composer Yoshihisa Hirano. The tracks 1–21 were composed and arranged by Hideki Taniuchi, while the tracks 22–28 were composed and arranged by Yoshihisa Hirano. The album features one track sung by Aya Hirano, performing as her character Misa Amane from the series. Also appearing on this soundtrack is the ending theme Coda～Death Note, which can be heard at the end of the final episode of the anime as the credits are shown. The first press' slipcover featured glow-in-the-dark artwork.

==== Track listing ====
1. "Death Image"
2. "L"
3. "L's Past" (Lの過去, L no Kako)
4. "Near's Theme" (ニアのテーマ, Nia no Tēma)
5. "Mello" (メロ, Mero)
6. "Mello 2" (メロ2, Mero 2)
7. "Action"
8. "L's Ideology" (Lの思想, L no Shisō)
9. "Mello's Theme" (メロのテーマ, Mero no Tēma)
10. "Confrontation" (対峙, Taiji)
11. "Near" (ニア, Nia)
12. "Misa" (ミサ, Misa)
13. "Misa's Video" (ミサのビデオ, Misa no Bideo)
14. "Misa's Loneliness" (ミサの孤独, Misa no Kodoku)
15. "Light's Return" (戻ったライト, Modotta Raito)
16. "Suspicion" (疑心, Gishin)
17. "Tactics" (細工, Saiku)
18. "Near 2" (ニア2, Nia 2)
19. "Light's Performance" (ライトの演技, Raito no Engi)
20. "Misa's Feelings" (ミサの気持ち, Misa no Kimochi)
21. "The Death of a Father" (父の死, Chichi no Shi)
22. "Misa's Song" (Orchestra Version) (Misa no Uta (orchestra version))
23. "Mikami Concertino"
24. "Trifling Stuff"
25. "Toward the Climax"
26. "Misa's Song (Piano Solo)" (Misa no Uta (piano solo))
27. "Misa's Song" (Misa no Uta)
28. "Coda～Death Note"

== Film soundtracks ==
=== Soundtracks of Death Note ===
Sound of Death Note

Soundtrack album by Kenji Kawai
- Released: 17 June 2006
- Genre: Film soundtrack
- Label: VAP

Sound of Death Note is a soundtrack featuring music from the first Death Note film composed and arranged by Kenji Kawai. It was released on 17 June 2006 by VAP and is priced at ¥2500. It is also available if you have the Death Note DVD in the original Japanese version.

==== Track listing ====
1. "A Heart attack"
2. "A Love Sickness"
3. "A Dispute"
4. "Confused"
5. "Realize the Limitations"
6. "Disturbance"
7. "...In the Heart"
8. "Astonishment"
9. "A Reality"
10. "Logic"
11. "A Challenge"
12. "Make a Noise in The World"
13. "A Shadow"
14. "The Test"
15. "Give the Right Answer"
16. "Reasoning Powers"
17. "Carry Out a Plan"
18. "Memo Paper"
19. "Be Cute"
20. "Impatience"
21. "An Image"
22. "Suspicion"
23. "Misunderstand"
24. "According to Plan"
25. "A Sacrifice"
26. "An Observer"
27. "Go Into Battle"
28. "Believe in Yourself"

=== Sound of Death Note the Last name ===
Sound of Death Note the Last name

Soundtrack album by Kenji Kawai
- Released: 2 November 2006
- Genre: Film soundtrack
- Label: VAP

Sound of Death Note the Last name is a soundtrack featuring music from the second Death Note film, Death Note the Last name, composed and arranged by Kenji Kawai. It was released on 2 November 2006 by VAP and is priced at ¥2500.

==== Track listing ====
1. "yellow eyes"
2. "sympathy"
3. "draw near"
4. "a temptation"
5. "eveningspot"
6. "sakura terebi matsuri ondo" (Note: lit. "sakura tv festival marching song")
7. "videotape message"
8. "burn with anger"
9. "stranger"
10. "a light shining in the darkness"
11. "warning"
12. "dear"
13. "imprisonment"
14. "weak point"
15. "make a program"
16. "parental love"
17. "tickle a person's vanity"
18. "trick"
19. "desire for revenge"
20. "investigate"
21. "narcissism"
22. "set a trap"
23. "be caught in a trap"
24. "advent"
25. "feint"
26. "an innocent virgin"
27. "decoy"
28. "fear"
29. "loser"
30. "game over"
31. "sad man"
32. "the dignity of man"
33. "pure love"
34. "the last name"

== Television drama soundtracks ==
=== "Death Note TV Drama" Original Soundtrack ===
"Death Note TV Drama" Original Soundtrack

Soundtrack album by Takayuki Hattori
- Released: August 26, 2015
- Genre: Anime soundtrack
- Length: 62 minutes
- Label: VAP

The "Death Note (TV Drama)" Original Soundtrack was released for the Death Note television drama in 2015. The soundtrack was composed by Takayuki Hattori. It was released on August 26, 2015

==== Track listing ====
1. "Death Note Main Theme"
2. "Sorrow of the Past"
3. "Write in The Death Note"
4. "Inner Thoughts"
5. "Shinigami's Descent"
6. "Breakthrough"
7. "Death Note Main Theme ~ Resolution"
8. "Angels And Demons"
9. "Floating Apple"
10. "Crime Begins"
11. "The Night Creeps In"
12. "Anger And Agitation"
13. "The Great Detective"
14. "Red Note"
15. "Mind Game"
16. "White Domain"
17. "Revolutionary"
18. "Daily Routine"
19. "Death Note Main Theme ~ Conflict"
20. "Father and Son"
21. "Clockwork Labyrinth"
22. "The Other Me"
23. "Heartache"
24. "Shinigami's Love"
25. "Death Note Main Theme ~ Extra"

== Tributes ==
=== Death Note Tribute ===
Death Note Tribute

Soundtrack album by Various Artists
- Released: June 21, 2006
- Genres: Rock, pop
- Label: BMG Japan

Death Note Tribute is a tribute album dedicated to the live action movie for the Death Note. Published by BMG Japan on June 21, 2006 (Japan), it contains 15 tracks performed by various artists, such as Shikao Suga (feat. Amazons), M-Flo, Buck-Tick and Aya Matsuura. The soundtrack came with a cosplay Death Note notebook.

==== Track listing ====
1. "Secret Society" (秘密結社, Himitsu Kessha) by Shikao Suga feat. Amazons
2. "37.0°C" by Hitomi Yaida
3. "Hands" by M-Flo
4. "Real Days" by MCU
5. "Straight to Hell" by Char
6. "Diabolo -Lucifer-" by Buck-Tick
7. "Avant Garde" (アバンギャルド, Abangyarudo) by Coil feat. Kyōko (杏子)
8. "Navigator of Darkness" (暗闇のナビゲイラ, Kurayami no Nabigeira) by Kreva
9. "Vendetta Code" by Aggressive Dogs / Death Note Allstars "D-Crew"
10. "Pursuit" by Aggressive Dogs / Death Note Allstars "N-Crew"
11. "Garden" by Kirito
12. "L↔R" by Dēmon Kogure Kakka
13. "We are five samurai" (我ら五人の侍なり ～We are five samurai～, Warera Gonin no Samurai Nari ~We are five samurai~) by PE'Z
14. "Good Night" (オヤスミナサイ, Oyasuminasai) by Kinmokusei
15. "My Wonderful Method" (私のすごい方法, Watashi no Sugoi Hōhō) by Aya Matsuura

=== The Songs for Death Note the movie～the Last name Tribute～ ===
The Songs for Death Note the movie～the Last name Tribute～

Soundtrack album by Various Artists
- Released: December 20, 2006
- Genres: Rock, pop
- Label: Sony Music Distribution (Japan) Inc.

The Songs for Death Note the movie～the Last name Tribute is a tribute album dedicated to the live action movie for the second Death Note. Published by Sony Music Distribution (Japan) Inc. on December 20, 2006 (Japan), it contains 14 tracks performed by various artist, such as Orange Range, abingdon boys school, High and Mighty Color, Doping Panda, Galneryus, and Slipknot DJ/turntablist Sid Wilson.

==== Track listing ====
1. "Hakai (Deathtroy)" by Kyono and DJ Starscream
2. "Light Your Fire" by Rize
3. "Chest" (チェスト, Chesuto) by Orange Range
4. "Current Void This Word" (～流れ・空虚・THIS WORD～, ~Nagare・Kūkyo・THIS WORD~) (D.N.version) by Uverworld
5. "Fre@K $HoW" by abingdon boys school
6. "energy" by High and Mighty Color
7. "Miracle" by Doping Panda
8. "Ninja Night School" by Ultra Brain
9. "My Soul" by Miliyah Kato
10. "Zinnia" (ジニア, Jinia) by Hoi Festa
11. "Drive" by Hitomi Takahashi
12. "Strange Days" by Tama
13. "Serenade (D.N.mix)" by Galneryus
14. "The Distorted World 'Lead to Spin off L'" by Daita
