= 010 (The Mad Capsule Markets album) =

Studio album by The Mad Capsule Markets
- Released: 11 July 2001 (Japan); 3 March 2003 (UK)
- Recorded: Westside Studio, Studio Yaya, Studio Sunshine, Landmark Studio (Japan)
- Genres: Digital hardcore, industrial metal, rap metal
- Length: 49:41
- Labels: Victor, Invitation, (Japan) PalmRyko, Palm Entertainment (US/UK)
- Producer: The Mad Capsule Markets

The Mad Capsule Markets chronology
Osc-Dis (1999)	010 (2001)	020120 (2002)

010 is the ninth studio album by Japanese band The Mad Capsule Markets. It was released in Japan in 2001 (published by Speedstar Records) and in the United Kingdom in 2003. The album was much more experimental than the band's previous two albums. 010 includes a cover of the song "Wardance" by Killing Joke.

== Track listing ==
All tracks are written by Kyono & Takeshi Ueda, except where noted.

No.	Title	Length
1.	"Introduction 010" (Ueda)	3:08
2.	"Come"	4.00
3.	"Chaos Step"	3:19
4.	"Gaga Life"	3:58
5.	"Jam!"	4:08
6.	"Kumo (雲-kumo-, Cloud)"	5:48
7.	"Wardance" (Killing Joke)	3:33
8.	"XXX Can of This" (Kyono, Miles, Ueda)	3:18
9.	"Bit Crusherrrr"	3:07
10.	"This Is the Mad Style" (Ueda)	0:32
11.	"Good Day"	3:47
12.	"Fly High"	3:51
13.	"No Food, Drink, or Smoking" (Ueda)	2:43
14.	"R.D.M.C"	4:23

== Personnel ==
- Higashi Ishida – Photography
- Kei Kusama – Programming
- Kyono – Vocals
- Mad Capsule Markets – Producer
- Jackie Miles – English Translations
- Motokatsu Miyagami – Drums, Programming
- Katsufumi Tomioka – Visual Design
- Takeshi Ueda – Synthesizer, Bass, Programming, Vocals
- Toru Wada – Design
- Kazushige Yamazaki – Mastering

== Charts ==
Year	Chart	Position
2001	Official Japanese Album Charts	5
