= Digidogheadlock =

Studio album by The Mad Capsule Markets
- Released: 26 September 1997 (Japan); 27 October 1998 (US); 1998 (UK)
- Recorded: 1997
- Studios: Eggs & Sheps studio Victor Yamanaka lake studio Studio Jive (Japan)
- Genres: Digital hardcore, industrial metal, rap metal, hardcore punk
- Length: 44:53
- Labels: Victor; Invitation
- Producer: The Mad Capsule Markets

The Mad Capsule Markets chronology
The Mad Capsule Market's (1996)	Digidogheadlock (1997)	Osc-Dis (1999)

Digidogheadlock is the seventh album by Japanese band The Mad Capsule Markets and their first to receive a European release. The album explored the sound that would later be used on their following album, Osc-Dis. TORUxxx stepped in on guitar for this album, although Takeshi Ueda recorded guitar on the track "Asphalt Beach". This album gained the band recognition by Digital Hardcore Recordings founder and Atari Teenage Riot frontman Alec Empire, who remixed two tracks and invited the band to tour with ATR. The album was released two years before the breakthrough album Osc-Dis; however, there was little international interest in Digdogheadlock when it released. The song "3:31" is a reference to vocalist Kyono's birthdate.

According to CD Journal, the album has sold more than 100,000 copies.

== Track listing ==
All tracks by Takeshi Ueda except where noted.

1. "Crash Pow" – 3:38
2. "Systematic" – 4:18
3. "What" – 3:10
4. "Water!" – 3:43
5. "Have No Fear" (Kyono) – 2:45
6. "Sickly Bug" – 3:21
7. "JMP" – 3:36
8. "3.31" (Kyono) – 4:28
9. "Asphalt-Beach" – 3:39
10. "Lose It" – 4:14
11. "Freak Is Born" (Kyono) – 1:17
12. "Do Justice To Yourself, Do Justice To My Life" – 2:20
13. "Creature" – 4:18
14. "Systematic" (Audio Active Remix) (European version only)
15. "Creature" (Alec Empire Mix) (European version only)
16. "Crash Pow" (Digital Hardcore Mix) (US bonus track)

== Personnel ==
- Takeshi Ueda – bass, guitar, programming, vocals
- TORUxxx – guitar
- Motokatsu Miyagami – drums
- Hiroshi Kyono – vocals
- Mad Capsule Markets – producer
- Yutaka Goto – executive producer
- Kei Kusama – programming
- Masanobu Murakami – assistant engineer
- Gary Stout – mixing
- Kazushige Yamazaki – mastering

== Charts ==
Year	Chart	Position
1997	Official Japanese Album Charts	14

== Regional differences ==
This album was released in Europe with a yellow cover (with no lyrical translations and a contains a typing error on the track listing), and in the U.S. with a purple cover. The US version only contains the two remixes by Alec Empire, whereas European version features an extra remix by the Japanese electronic band Audio Active. both of these versions are out of print, and very hard to find.
