= Takeshi Ueda =

Japanese musician

- Also known as: Cra¥ Kure Takeshi; Kurejii Takeshi; Takeshi "¥" Ueda
- Born: August 25, 1968 (age 58)
- Origin: Yokohama, Japan
- Genres: Punk, metal, digital hardcore
- Instruments: Bass, Synthesizer, Programmer
- Years active: 1985 - present
- Formerly of: AA=, The Mad Capsule Markets, Berrie
- Website: http://www.fuzzrezzweep.com

Takeshi Ueda (上田剛士, Ueda Takeshi; born August 25, 1968) is the bassist, programmer, additional vocalist and songwriter for The Mad Capsule Markets. He is often known for his unique way of bass guitar playing, and ever changing haircuts.

== Musical career ==
Takeshi was born in Yokohama, Japan. Not much is known about his childhood, just that he was a big YMO fan and joined the pre-Mad Capsule Markets band Berrie in 1985 after vocalist Kyono and guitarist Minoru Kojima had advertised for a bass guitarist. Since he has been in The Mad Capsule Markets, his style of bass guitar playing has evolved into more than the straight punk bass he used to play. From 1996, when lead guitarist Ai Ishigaki left, Takeshi's bass became the main centerpiece of the band and was more experimental in its use, as he experimented by tuning down his bass to give it more of a Rap-Metal effect. By the time of the Digidogheadlock and OSC-DIS albums, he had mastered the guitar and synthesizer (although it is stated that he probably played most of the piano parts on the early albums), started using many effects pedals, and had a similar sound to Tom Morello's style of guitar playing.

He has gone under many pseudonyms, such as Kure Takeshi (his name in Berrie), Kurejii Takeshi, (his name on Humanity), Cra¥ (the name he used from 1991 to 1997), and Takeshi "¥" Ueda (on the albums 4 Plugs and Digidogheadlock). With The Mad Capsule Markets currently on hiatus, Takeshi has been working on his clothing line Fuzz Rez Zweep.

== AA= ==
Ueda has released his first album, #1, in February 2009 with the band AA= (standing for "all animals are equal"). AA= also features vocalist Takayoshi Shirakawa (of Back Drop Bomb), guitarist Minoru Kojima (also known as Shin Murohime, previously of The Mad Capsule Markets and die in cries) and drummer Nobuaki Kaneko (of Rize).

In September 2009 AA= released a live DVD of the tour to support #1 called Tour #1. A second album, #2, followed in June 2010. In 2011 they released their third album, #3, again followed by a tour DVD Tour #3 ver.1.0+2.0 in 2013. In the same year they released their next album, split into two half-length volumes, # and 4. The corresponding tour DVD, TOUR #4 +MV, is set to be released on September 28, 2014.

AA= have recorded a cover of 先天性労働者 (sentensei roudousha) on the tribute Album to Michiro Endo. They also started AA= Aid and are currently releasing a single with proceeds going to support those affected by the Japanese tsunami.

== Custom bass guitar ==
- Takeshi has his own signature Bass, available from Fender Japan and based on a 1962 precision bass with a few of Takeshi's personal touches. It is available in both 4 and 5 string models, with a different set of stickers depending on which model it is.
- The stickers on his bass, among others, are: various Mad Capsule Markets logos, a Rat Fink sticker (of Ed Roth fame), a Cyborn on the 5 string, and a Pochi skull and crossbones logo. The Cyborn and Pochi were two of The Mad Capsule Markets' mascots.

== Contributions ==
- Deli – Time For Some Action

Takeshi remixes the title track and "Secret Express".

- Wrench – Overflow

Takeshi remixed the song "Fact".

- Ridge Racer V

Takeshi made the song "DRFTDVL".

- Godzilla - Destroy The Monsters

The song "Godzilla walk" was remixed by Takeshi.

- YMO Remixes Technopolis

Takeshi remixed "Tong Poo" alongside fellow mad member Motokatsu Miyagami.

- Soft Ballet – Incubate

Takeshi plays bass on the song "Piled Higher Deeper" fellow mad member Ai Ishigaki.

- Schaft – Switchblade

Takeshi plays bass on the song "The Heroin Side".

- Issay – Flowers

Takeshi plays bass on tracks 1 and 8.

- Merry – Calling

Takeshi remixed the track "Japanese Modernist" for the single's limited-edition version.

- BiS – STUPiG

Produced the A-side, a digital hardcore track.

- Babymetal – Babymetal

Produced the track "Gimme Chocolate!!".

- Babymetal – Metal Resistance

Produced the track "Awadama Fever".
