= Ace of Spades (band) =

Japanese rock band

- Also known as: AOS
- Origin: Japan
- Genres: Rock
- Years active: 2012-present
- Labels: LDH, Rhythm Zone
- Members: Takahiro (Vocals); Hisashi (Guitar); Tokie (Bass); Motokatsu Miyagami (Drums)

Ace of Spades (Japanese: エース・オブ・スペーズ, stylized as ACE OF SPADES) is a Japanese rock band managed by LDH since 2012 and signed to the record label Rhythm Zone. The band started being formed in 2005 while Exile and Glay released the collaboration single "Scream". The project was formed between Hiro and Glay members Hisashi and Takuro.

== History ==
=== 2012: band formation and debut ===
In 2012, it was announced that a band project between Exile and Glay had been formed. The members of this band were established musicians from different backgrounds, such as Takahiro from Exile, Hisashi from Glay, Tokie and Motokatsu Miyagami. On August 22 of the same year, Ace of Spades debuted with the single "Wild Tribe".

=== 2013-2018: hiatus and High&Low soundtrack ===
After their debut the band were on hiatus until 2016, when they took part in the soundtrack for the movie High&Low and its sequel High&Low: The Red Rain. For these occasions the band released the song "Sin" featuring Hiroomi Tosaka on June 15, 2016, and the single "Time Flies" together with PKCZ® and Hiroomi Tosaka, on October 12, 2016.

=== 2019: first studio album and tour ===
On February 20, 2019, the band released their first studio album "4Real" with the title track "Vampire". They went on their first national tour Ace of Spades 1st. Tour 2019 “4Real” from February 26 until March 23 in the same year.

== Members ==
Name	Position/Instrument	Date of birth	Other Groups
Takahiro	Vocal	December 8, 1984 (age 34)	Exile
Hisashi	Guitar	February 2, 1972 (age 47)	Glay Rally
Tokie	Bass	July 1, 1965 (age 54)	Rize Ajico Losalios unkie The Lipsmax Havenstamp Cell No.13 Hea
Motokatsu Miyagami	Drums	February 1, 1969 (age 50)	The Mad Capsule Markets Schaft Rally Gastunk

== Discography ==
=== Studio albums ===
Title	Details	Peak positions	Sales	Certifications
4Real	Released: February 20, 2019; Label: Rhythm Zone; CD, CD/DVD, CD/Blu-ray, digital download	4	TBA	TBA

=== Singles ===
Title	Details	Peak positions	Sales	Certifications
Wild Tribe	Released: August 22, 2012; Label: Rhythm Zone; CD, CD/DVD, digital download	3	TBA	TBA
Time Flies × PKCZ® feat. Hiroomi Tosaka	Released: October 12, 2016; Label: Rhythm Zone; CD, CD/DVD, digital download	TBA	TBA	TBA
