= Mix-ism =

Studio album by The Mad Capsule Markets
- Released: 21 January 1994
- Recorded: Master Rock Studios, England
- Genres: Punk rock, hardcore punk, alternative metal, ska punk
- Length: 47:02
- Labels: Victor, Invitation
- Producer: The Mad Capsule Markets

The Mad Capsule Markets chronology
| Speak!!!! (1992) | Mix-ism (1994) | Gichi / Ayatsuri ningyou / Karakuri no soko (1994) |

Mix-ism is the fourth album from The Mad Capsule Markets. Mix-ism earned The Mad Capsule Markets their first high rated album on the charts; it also featured the band experimenting and branching out, showing a more melodious sound overall. The album has a very dark feel to it compared to other releases, mainly coming from the lyrical themes featured. The album was also recorded in England.

== Track listing ==
1. "Mix-ism" – 1:29
2. "S・S・Music" – 3:56
3. "Proletariat" (プロレタリア, Proletariat) – 3:26
4. "New Society" – 3:17
5. "Pet" – 3:12
6. "Mannequin" (マネキン, Mannequin) – 3:31
7. "Nationalism No!!!!" (ナショナリズム No!!!!, Nationalism No!!!!) – 2:07
8. "Orugooru" (オルゴヲル, Music Box) – 2:16
9. "IC City" (IC シティ, IC City) – 2:51
10. "Too Flat" – 2:41
11. "Furui tokei" (古い時計, Old Clock) – 3:23
12. "IQ Speaker" – 2:26
13. "Neo Sunday~Atarashii Nichiyoubi" (Neo Sunday~新しい日曜日, New Sunday) – 2:40
14. "Problem Children" – 4:28
15. "Be Silent Fuckin' System" – 3:02
16. "Kiiroi piero" (黄色いピエロ, Yellow Clown) – 2:09

== Charts ==
| Year | Chart | Position |
|---|---|---|
| 1994 | Official Japanese Albums Chart | 27 |

== Band members ==
- Hiroshi Kyono - Vocals
- Takeshi Ueda - Bass
- Motokatsu Miyagami - Drums
- Ai Ishigaki - Guitars
