= Starscream (disambiguation) =

Starscream can be:

- Starscream, a character from the Transformers franchise.

Starscream can also refer to:

- DJ Starscream, a stage name of DJ Sid Wilson.
