= Gichi / Ayatsuri ningyou / Karakuri no soko =

EP by The Mad Capsule Markets
- Released: August 3, 1994
- Recorded: 1991
- Genres: Heavy metal, punk rock
- Length: 15:30
- Labels: Victor, Invitation
- Producer: The Mad Capsule Markets

The Mad Capsule Markets chronology
Mix-ism (1994)	Gichi / Ayatsuri ningyou / Karakuri no soko (1994)	Park (1994)

Gichi / Ayatsuri ningyou / Karakuri no soko (ギチ・あやつり人形・カラクリの底) is a compilation EP by Japanese band The Mad Capsule Markets. This album collects all the songs from the P.O.P era (including a few B-sides), which were re-done for the Gichi Video. The song "Ayatsuri Ningyo" (Marionette) has appeared on four different albums, with different interpretations of the song.

== Track listing ==
1. "Gichi" (ギチ, Gichi)
2. "Karakuri no Soko" (カラクリの底, Dirty Trick)
3. "Dou shiyou mo nai Hito no Uta" (どうしようもない~~恋~~人の唄, Hopeless Person's Song)
4. "Giragira" (ギラギラ, Glare)
5. "Ayatsuri Ningyou" (あやつり人形, Marionette)
6. "La~la~la~ (Boku ga Usotsuki ni Natta Hi)" (ラ・ラ・ラ (僕がウソつきになった日), La~la~la~ The Day I Became a Liar)
