= Hakai (album) =

HAKAI

Studio album by Wagdug Futuristic Unity
- Released: July 23, 2008 (Japan)
- Genre: Digital hardcore, Techno
- Label: Sony Music (Japan)
- Producer: Hiroshi Kyono

Wagdug Futuristic Unity chronology
Nu Riot (2007)	HAKAI (2008)

Hakai is the first studio album from Hiroshi Kyono as Wagdug Futuristic Unity and was released on July 23, 2008. The album is the follow-up to the 2007 EP Nu Riot. The song with Justice is a remake of their most popular song, "Waters of Nazareth". Another track from the album, "Systematic People", was released as a single and also used as the opening theme for the anime series Kurozuka.

== Track listing ==
1. Hakai (featuring DJ Starscream) (Hakai version)
2. Got Life
3. Systematic People (featuring Maximum the Ryokun) (DUG version)
4. Why? (featuring Ceephax)
5. Mad Saturator
6. Ill Machine (featuring Ultra Brain) (Hakai version)
7. G.O.D. Space
8. Wall (featuring Chino Moreno)
9. Mass Compression (featuring Ultra Brain)
10. Chaostic Radio
11. Rise It! (featuring Funkygong)
12. X-Stereo (featuring Justice)
13. Nu World (featuring Numanoid vs. Mazda)

Bonus Tracks

14. Weapons of Wag Distortion (featuring Com.A)
15. Systematic People (featuring Maximum the Ryokun) (WAG version)

== Personnel ==
- Hiroshi Kyono - vocals, lyrics, synth

=== Guest appearances ===
- Ceephax
- Funkygong
- Justice
- Chino Moreno
- Numanoid vs. Mazda
- Maximum the Ryokun
- DJ Starscream
- Ultra Brain
