= Cistm Konfliqt... =

CiSTm K0nFLiqT...

Studio album by The Mad Capsule Markets
- Released: 31 March 2004 (Japan); 26 October 2005 (UK)
- Recorded: Destroyder Studio, Innig (Japan)
- Genres: Industrial metal, digital hardcore, rap metal
- Length: 43:25
- Labels: Victor, Speedstar (Japan), GUT Records (UK)
- Producers: Takeshi Ueda, The Mad Capsule Markets

The Mad Capsule Markets chronology
020120 (2002)	CiSTm K0nFLiqT... (2004)	1990–1996 (2005)

CiSTm K0nFLiqT... ("system conflict") is the tenth and last studio album by Japanese band The Mad Capsule Markets. It was released in 2004 in Japan and 2005 in the United Kingdom. The UK version included two bonus live tracks, a video for "W.O.R.L.D", and an alternative cover.

After the album's release, the band was invited to The Radio One Lock Up show to play a session, and the song "Cracker!" was featured on the Japanese version of the Resident Evil: Apocalypse soundtrack. Former Pride FC Champion Takanori Gomi has used the song "Scary" as his entrance music.

== Track listing ==
1. Start ID – 0:12
2. Retalk – 3:30
3. Bomb Idea – 2:20
4. Scary (Delete Streamin' Freq. from Fear Side) – 3:57
5. W.O.R.L.D. – 4:25
6. クラッカー!!! (Cracker!!!) – 3:48
7. Sunny Beach Rd. – 3:12
8. Grim Monster – 3:21
9. Loud Up! – 2:44
10. She Loves It (Explore the New Day) – 3:38
11. Let It Rip (Download from Joujouka) – 4:50
12. Happy Ride – 3:11
13. CiSTm K0nFLiqT... – 4:21
14. Pulse [Live] – 3:23 (UK release only)
15. Island [Live] – 5:15 (UK release only)
16. W.O.R.L.D [Video] (UK release only)

"Let It Rip (Download from Joujouka)" is a remake of the psychedelic trance band Joujouka's song "Let It Rip".
