= We in Music =

Studio album by Doping Panda
- Released: May 5, 2004
- Label: NIW! Records

We in Music is an album by Doping Panda, released May 5, 2004, on NIW! Records.

== Track listing ==
1. Introgical (We in Music)
2. Start Me Up
3. Mr.Superman
4. Uncovered
5. Party Song
6. Lovers Soca
7. Interlude
8. Turn of the Silence
9. DHA-DHI-DHA
10. Stairs
11. One Foot out my Life

== Charts ==
Chart performance for We in Music
| Chart (2004) | Peak position |
|---|---|
| Japan (Oricon) | 48 |
