= Nu Riot =

EP by Wagdug Futuristic Unity
- Released: 24 October 2007 (Japan)
- Recorded: Burnish Studio
- Genres: Digital hardcore, techno
- Length: 21:48
- Label: Sony Music (Japan)
- Producer: Hiroshi Kyono

Wagdug Futuristic Unity chronology
Nu Riot (2007)	Hakai (2008)

Nu Riot (printed as NU ЯIOT and pronounced "New Riot") is the debut "mini-album" from Wagdug Futuristic Unity, released on October 24, 2007. "Ill Machine" was the only single from the album and also appears on the soundtrack to the new Appleseed Ex Machina. Also, The intro of the remixed version of Hakai (Deathtroy) is sampled from the SPK's song "slogun".

== Track listing ==
1. "Nu Riot" (featuring Shitdisco) – 2:55
2. "Mad Saturator" – 1:47
3. "Ill Machine" (featuring Ultra Brain) (album version) – 5:14
4. "Budda Space" – 0:53
5. "Mass Compression" (featuring Ultra Brain) - 1:29
6. "Imgn x Loud" (featuring Motor) – 4:57
7. "Hakai (Deathtroy)" (featuring DJ Starscream) (Mix by Cycheouts G) – 4:30

== Personnel ==
- Hiroshi Kyono - vocals, lyrics, synth

=== Guest appearances ===
- Shitdisco
- Ultra Brain
- Motor
- DJ Starscream
- Cycheouts G
