= Park (album) =

Studio album by The Mad Capsule Markets
- Released: 21 October 1994 (Japan) 1996 (US)
- Recorded: innig Recording Hostelry; Sound Sky studio Kawana; Key Stone studio Izu (Japan)
- Genres: Punk rock, pop punk, rap metal, alternative rock
- Length: 47:51
- Labels: Victor, Invitation
- Producer: The Mad Capsule Markets

The Mad Capsule Markets chronology
Gichi / Ayatsuri ningyou / Karakuri no soko (1994)	Park (1994)	4 Plugs (1996)

Park is the fifth album from The Mad Capsule Markets and their first to be released in the United States. The album shows the band start to incorporate rap metal influences, an element that would become crucial in their later style. The melodious elements from Mix-ism are still prominent in several tracks. The album is often considered to be one of the band's best works. Hide praised the album as a perfect example of state of the art Japanese rock. The US release was accompanied by two bonus tracks (originally limited to the initial run of the original Japanese pressing).

== Track listing ==
1. "Hi-Side (High-Individual-Side)"
2. "Limit"
3. "In Surface Noise"
4. "Parasite (Kiseichu)" (パラサイト (寄生虫), Parasite)
5. "Kouen e Ato Sukoshi" (公園へあと少し, A Bit More to the Park)
6. "Hab'it"
7. "Cr'ock on the Work (Auto-matic)"
8. "Toki no Oto" (時ノ音, Sound of Time)
9. "Umareta Bakari no Kaiga wo Moyase" (生まれたばかりの絵画を燃やせ, Burn the Newborn Painting)
10. "P-A-R-K"
11. "Mustard"
12. "The Life in Fairy Story" ♠
13. "Taiyou no Shita" (太陽の下, Under the Sun) ♠

♠Limited Edition Pressing & U.S. Pressing Bonus Tracks

== Charts ==
Year	Chart	Position
1994	Official Japanese Albums Chart	19
