= The Mad Capsule Market's =

Greatest hits album by The Mad Capsule Markets
- Released: 4 September 1996
- Recorded: 1996; Paradise Komazawa studio Paradise East studio Studio Jive (Japan)
- Genres: Digital hardcore, rap metal, hardcore punk
- Length: 39:24
- Producer: The Mad Capsule Market's

The Mad Capsule Markets chronology
4 Plugs (1996)	The Mad Capsule Market's (1996)	Digidogheadlock (1997)

The Mad Capsule Market's is a compilation album by Japanese rock band The Mad Capsule Markets. All of the songs have been re-recorded and two have been remixed. On this version of "HI-SIDE", the band displayed more experimentation with the English language and "Walk!!" was remixed by respected dub artist Adrian Sherwood. This was the last album that guitarist Ai Ishigaki played on; he was later replaced by support guitarist TORUxxx.

== Track listing ==
1. "Possess in Loop!!!!!!!!!!"
2. "Mix-ism"
3. "S. S. Music"
4. "Mass Media"
5. "Hi-Side"
6. "Parasite (Kiseichuu)"
7. "Jesus is Dead? Jesus is Alive?" (Bryan New Mix Version)
8. "G.M.J.P"
9. "Down in the System [System Error]"
10. "La~la~la~ (Boku ga usotsuki ni natta hi)" La~la~la~ (The Day I Became a Liar)
11. "Walk!" (Adrian Sherwood Remix)

== Charts ==
Chart (1996)	Peak position
Official Japanese Albums Chart	10
