= Takahiro (singer) =

Japanese singer and actor (born 1984)

Exile Takahiro 田﨑 敬浩
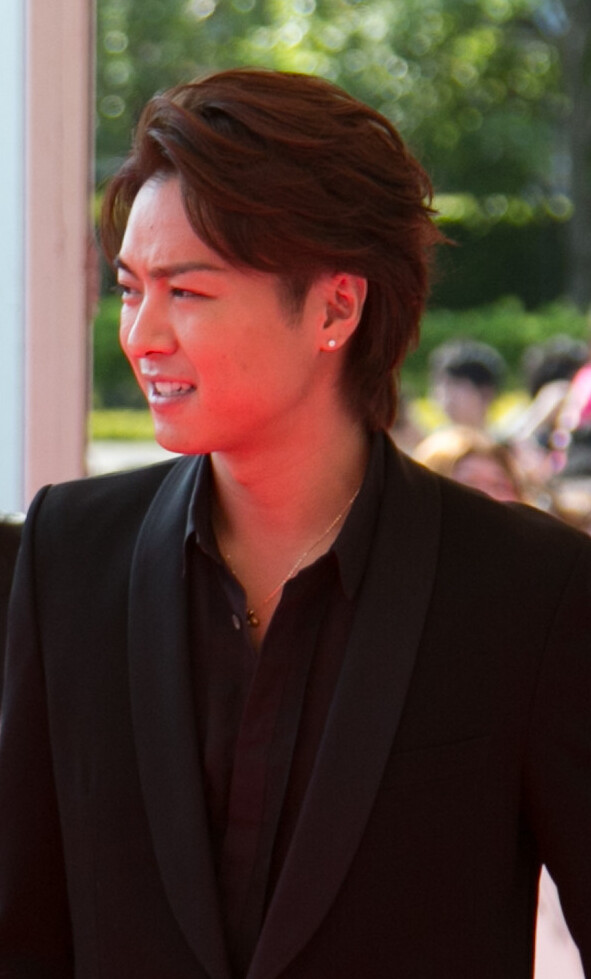
- Takahiro in 2014

Background information
- Also known as: Takahiro; Exile Takahiro
- Born: Takahiro Tasaki; 8 December 1984 (age 41); Nagasaki Prefecture, Japan
- Genres: J-pop
- Occupations: Singer; actor
- Instrument: Vocals
- Years active: 2006–present
- Label: Rhythm Zone
- Website: Official website

Takahiro Tasaki (田﨑敬浩; born 8 December 1984), better known by his stage name Takahiro and Exile Takahiro (stylized as TAKAHIRO and EXILE TAKAHIRO), is a Japanese singer and actor. He is the vocalist of Exile along with Atsushi, as well as Ace of Spades.

Takahiro grew up in Nagasaki Prefecture.

== Biography ==
Takahiro Tasaki was born on 8 December 1984, and was raised up in Nagasaki Prefecture. He has a younger sister.

He became a big fan of Exile when he and his friends attended one of their concerts in 2005. He decided to join the "EXILE Vocal Battle Audition 2006 ~ASIAN DREAM~" and became the final winner of the audition, held at Nippon Budokan on 22 September 2006. After he won, he eventually became the new vocalist of Exile alongside original member Atsushi.

The addition of Takahiro to the group was considered Exile's second era. After he joined, he was given the stage name TAKAHIRO and the group went on to release 3 singles and an album to allow fans, new and old, to adapt to the "new" Exile. They held their tour EXILE LIVE TOUR 2007 EXILE EVOLUTION during May 2007 to further promote the new image of their group. The tour ended at Tokyo Dome on 5 August 2007.

In April 2012, he became the vocalist of the rock band Ace of Spades. They debuted on 22 August in the same year with the single "WILD TRIBE".

On 26 June 2013, he made a solo debut with the single "Issen Ichibyou" (一千一秒; One Thousand and One Second). Takahiro wrote 3 out of the 4 songs from the single himself.

In January 2014, he made his acting debut in the Nippon TV drama Senryoku-gai Sōsa-kan (戦力外捜査官; External Force Investigator). On 5 March 2014, he released his 2nd single "Love Story" which was also used as the theme song for his first drama. Additionally, Takahiro held his first solo exhibition Hajime – Enogu Baka Nisshi - (始－絵具バカ日誌－; Beginning Painter's Diary) at Saitama Super Arena TOIRO in June of the same year. It showcased approximately 200 of his artworks, including calligraphy, paintings and digital art which fuses calligraphy and photography.

On 20 February 2015, it was announced that Takahiro's first drama from 2014 would have a sequel titled Senryoku-gai Sōsa-kan Hime Deka Kurage Senba (戦力外捜査官 姫デカ・海月千波). On 23 September 2015, Takahiro released his first solo album the VISIONALUX. It was also announced that one of its tracks, "Itsuka mata Aetara", was chosen as the TV commercial theme song for the first season of American series Gotham. Takahiro's first solo album sold about 39.000 copies in the first week of its release and immediately took the 1st spot on Oricon's weekly albums ranking. Between the beginning of 2014 and the end of 2015, Takahiro starred in several commercials for Samantha Thavasa's Samantha Thavasa meets SAMANTHA KINGZ collection alongside supermodel Miranda Kerr.

On 28 March 2017, it was announced that Takahiro would make his stage acting debut in the Japanese premiere of the British play MOJO and that he had been selected for the main role. On 4 October, he released his 3rd single "Eternal Love". It was his first solo release in two years since his first album. On 6 December, he released his first mini-album All-The-Time Memories. Dream Ami participated in the music video as well as the chorus of the track "BLACK BEANZ" and "Irish Blue" was written for Takahiro by Glay's Takuro.

On 13 June 2018, Takahiro attended the Short Short Film Festival & Asia 2018 (SSFF & ASIA), the largest international short film festival, to present the short film Canaria (カナリア) in which he participated in as an actor.

On 30 January 2019, it was announced that he would play the lead role in the movie Boku ni, Aitakatta (僕に、会いたかった), which would be released on 10 May. This would be his first time starring in a movie. A few months later, on 15 April, it was announced that Takahiro would be starring in the historical movie Three Nobunaga (3人の信長) too. It was released on 20 September. On 8 July in the same year, he released the digital single "Last Night", his first musical work as a solo artists in nearly 2 years. The track is a self-cover of Ace of Spades' song with the same name. On 13 July, Takahiro performed at the live event J-WAVE LIVE 20th ANNIVERSARY EDITION at Yokohama Arena. On the 27th of the same month, he also started the fan club event tour TAKAHIRO Road Station 2019 (TAKAHIRO 道の駅 2019). During one of the stops it was announced that Takahiro would release another digital single, "YOU are ROCK STAR" on 16 October.

== Personal life ==
On 1 September 2017, it was announced that he had married Emi Takei. They had co-starred in Takahiro's acting-debut drama Senryoku-gai Sōsa-kan and its sequel together. Their first daughter was born in March 2018.

== Discography ==
=== Singles ===
Year	Title	Oricon rank
2013	Issen Ichibyou	2
2014	Love Story	3
2017	Eternal Love	3

=== Digital Singles ===
Year	Title	Release date
2014	Dakishimetai (抱きしめたい)	17 September
2019	Last Night	8 July
2019	YOU are ROCK STAR	16 October

=== Studio albums ===
Title	Album Details	Peak Chart Positions		Sales
Title	Album Details	Oricon	Billboard	Sales
the VISIONALUX	Released: 23 September 2015; Label: Rhythm Zone; Formats: CD, CD/DVD, 3CD/3DVD	1		

=== Mini-albums ===
Title	Album Details	Peak Chart Positions		Sales
Title	Album Details	Oricon	Billboard	Sales
All-The-Time Memories	Released: 6 December 2017; Label: Rhythm Zone; Formats: CD, CD/DVD, CD/Blu-ray			

=== Other songs (prior to his solo debut) ===
Year	Title	Notes
2011	Ishindenshin	19 cover; included in Exile's first limited-edition cover album Exile Cover from Negai no Tō
2012	PLACE	Recorded in Exile's album Exile Japan

=== Collaboration works ===
Title	Notes
Scream	Included in Exile's album Exile Entertainment Best
My Buddy	Exile Takahiro + Nesmith, Shokichi (J Soul Brothers), collaboration; recorded in Exile's album Exile Entertainment Best
My Buddy part. II	Exile Takahiro + Nesmith, Shokichi (J Soul Brothers), collaboration; recorded in Nidaime J Soul Brothers' album J Soul Brothers

=== Participation works ===
Year	Title	Notes
2012	All You Need Is Love	Japan United with Music's work
	Bloom	Atsushi's work; participated in chorus; recorded in Exile's album Exile Best Hits -Love Side-

== Works ==
=== Lyrics ===
Song	Artist	Recorded works	Notes
"Dream Catcher"	Exile	Album Exile Evolution	Composed by Yoshiaki Fujisawa
"I Believe"	Exile	Single "I Believe"	Composed by Masaaki Asada
"You're my sunshine"	Exile	Single "Pure / You're my sunshine"	Composed by Kazuhiro Hara
"My Buddy / Exile Takahiro + Nesmith, Shokichi (J Soul Brothers)"	Exile	Best album Exile Entertainment Best	Lyrics and co-written by Michico; composed by Michico and T.Kura
"My Buddy part. II / Exile Takahiro + Nesmith, Shokichi (J Soul Brothers)"	Nidaime J Soul Brothers	Album J Soul Brothers	Lyrics and co-written by Michico; composed by Michico and T.Kura
"I Believe (New Ver.)"	Exile	Album Aisubeki Mirai e (Christmas album Exile Christmas)	"I Believe" alternate version
"Your Smile"	Exile	Album Aisubeki Mirai e	Composed by Asada
"Going On"	Exile	Double maxi single "Fantasy"	Composed by Hara
"Tegami"	Exile	Album Negai no Tō	Composed by Hiroo Yamaguchi
"Inochi no Hana"	Exile	Album Exile Japan / Solo	Composed by Tatsuro Mashiko
"Wild Tribe"	Ace of Spades	Single "Wild Tribe"	Lyrics co-written and composed by audio 2 audio
"Now Here"	Ace of Spades	Single "Wild Tribe"	Lyrics co-written and composed by audio 2 audio
"Chikai"	Ace of Spades	Single "Wild Tribe"	Composed by Kotaro Egami
"with..."	Takahiro	Single "Ichi Sen Ichi Byō"	Composed and arranged by Asada
"Futsukazuki"	Takahiro	Single "Ichi Sen Ichi Byō"	Composed and arranged by Cozzi
"Yakusoku no Sora"	Takahiro	Single "Ichi Sen Ichi Byō"	Composed by Tatsuro Mashiko; arranged by Daisuke Kahara
"Love Story"	Takahiro	Single "Love story"	Composed and arranged by Cozzi
"Feelings"	Takahiro	Single "Love story"	Composed, arranged, co-written by Cozzi
"Zutto"	Takahiro	Single "Love story"	Composed and arranged by Hara
"Dakishimetai"	Takahiro	Limited delivery single "Dakishimetai"	Composed by Yamaguchi; arranged by Kahara
"Keep On Singing"	Exile Tribe	Album Exile Tribe Evolution	Composed by Fast Lane and Erik Lidbom
"RED PHOENIX"	Exile Tribe	RISING SUN TO THE WORLD	
"PARADOX "	Exile Tribe	paradox	

=== Compositions ===
Song	Artist	Recorded works	Notes
"Feelings"	Takahiro	Single "Love Story"	Co-written by Cozzi; played the guitar in the song; also wrote the lyrics

=== Tie-ups ===
Song	Tie-up
"Place"	Meiji Seika "Dorea" advert song
"Ichi Sen Ichi Byō"	Sukkiri!! ending theme in June
"Ichi Sen Ichi Byō"	Daiichi Kosho Company "Smart Dam" advert song
"Ichi Sen Ichi Byō"	Kagi no nai Yume o Miru image song
"with..."	NTT Communications "050 plus" advert song
"Love Story"	Senryoku-gai Sōsa-kan theme song
"Love Story"	Samantha Thavasa meets Samantha Kingz "Kaban no Naka ni, Koi o o hitotsu." advert song
"Sankaku no Aurora –Aoi Haru–"	Sankaku no Aurora theme song
"You"	Ezaki Glico "Bokujō shibori" advert song
"Itsuka mata Aetara"	Gotham DVD advert song
"Eternal Love"	Huis Ten Bosch "Kingdom of Light" theme song

== Exhibitions ==
Year	Title	Ref.
2014	Hajime: Enogu Baka Nisshi	

== Live ==
Year	Title
2014	Exile Tribe Perfect Year 2014 Special Stage "The Survival" In Saitama Super Arena 10 Days

== Filmography ==
=== TV dramas ===
Year	Title	Role	Notes	Ref.
2014	Senryoku-gai Sōsa-kan	Kyosuke Shitara	Lead role	
2015	Senryoku-gai Sōsa-kan hime deka kurage Senba	Kyosuke Shitara	Sequel	
2015	Wild Heroes	Kiichi "Kii Bou" Segawa	Lead role	
2015	High & Low: The Story Of S.W.O.R.D.	Masaki Amamiya		
2016	High & Low: Season 2	Masaki Amamiya		
2025	Masked Ninja Akakage	Oda Nobunaga		

=== Films ===
Year	Title	Role	Notes	Ref.
2016	Road To High&Low	Masaki Amamiya		
2016	High&Low The Movie	Masaki Amamiya		
2016	High&Low The Red Rain	Masaki Amamiya		
2017	High&Low The Movie 2 / End Of Sky	Masaki Amamiya		
2017	High&Low The Movie 3 / Final Mission	Masaki Amamiya		
2019	Boku ni, Aitakatta	Toru Ikeda	Lead role	
2019	Three Nobunaga	Oda Nobunaga	Lead role	

=== Short films ===
Year	Title	Role	Ref.
2018	Uta Monogatari -CINEMA FIGHTERS project- "Canaria" (カナリア)	Nagata Ryo	

=== TV programs ===
Year	Title	Network	Notes	Ref.
2009	Koi no Karasawagi		guest	
2009	Sanma & Exile no Sekai ni Hitotsudake no Uta	TV Asahi	MC	
2009	CDTV SPECIAL！New Year's Premier Live 2009→2010	TBS	MC	
2012	EX-Lounge	TBS	MC	
2014–2015	Viking	Fuji TV	Biweekly Tuesday MC	

=== Stage ===
Year	Title	Role	Notes	Ref.
2017	MOJO		Lead role, Japanese premiere	

=== Advertisements ===
Year	Title	Ref.
2009	Toyota Wish	
2009	Meiji Fran	
2010	Meiji Milk Chocolate	
2010	Rohto Pharmaceutical Rohto Z!	
2010	Kirin Beverage Kirin Lemon	
2011	Fujitsu Arrows	
2011	GREE "Seisen Cerberus"	
2011	NTT Communications "050 plus"	
2011	Meiji "Dorea"	
2012	Kosé "adidas skin protection"	
2012	Fujitsu FMV	
2013	The Coca-Cola Company Coca-Cola Zero	
2013	Daiichi Kosho Company "Smart Dam"	
2014	Samantha Thavasa meets Samantha Kingz	
2014	Yōfuku no Aoyama	
2015	Ezaki Glico Bokujō shibori	
2015	Suntory The Malts	
2015	Samantha Thavasa 2015 Spring / Summer	
2018	Nissin "Cup Noddle"	

=== Others ===
Year	Title	Ref.
2016	Sasebo Tourism Honorary Ambassador	

== Bibliography ==
=== Magazine serializations ===
Title
Men's Non-no
Men's Joker
