= Minoru Kojima =

Japanese musician

Minoru Kojima (born 11 October 1968) is a Japanese guitarist, who was the original guitarist for the experimental punk band The Mad Capsule Markets. He is also known as Scene or Shin Murohime, which is apparently a conglomeration of characters from the names of different Boøwy members. He started The Mad Capsule Markets (which at the time was called Berrie) in 1985, with vocalist Hiroshi Kyono, in an attempt to create "loud, punk music" after becoming "bored" with music played on television and radio. After the release of Mad's Humanity, Minoru left the band and was replaced by "support guitarist" Ai Ishigaki. In 1991 Minoru started Die in Cries and in 1994 became a member of The Bloody Imitation Society. Over the years Minoru worked with more bands and even went solo for a short time before returning to Mad to play on "Good Day" from their album 010 and playing on their "Cistm Konfliqt" tour.

Minoru also involves himself in co-arranging music for other artists including Tetsuya and Chieko Kawabe. He has also played guitar on Aikawa Nanase's album 7 Seven and her mini album R.U.O.K.?! alongside former hide with Spread Beaver members - I.N.A., K.A.Z, Chirolyn, D.I.E, "Crazy" Cool Joe from Dead End and Pata from X Japan. He is also a member of Bug, with his former Die in Cries bandmate and D'erlanger front man, Kyo. Minoru currently performs with the band Spin.

== Discography ==
=== Berrie ===
Title	Release date	Label
Poison Revolution	198?	

=== The Mad Capsule Markets ===
Title	Release date	Label
Government Wall	January 8, 1990	Insect Noise
Humanity	October 1, 1990	Insect Noise

=== Optic Nerve ===
Title	Release date	Label
Abstraction	September 10, 1991	

=== Bug ===
Title	Release date	Label
Bugmania	June 26, 2002	Cutting Edge
