= Sid Wilson =

American DJ and keyboardist (born 1977)

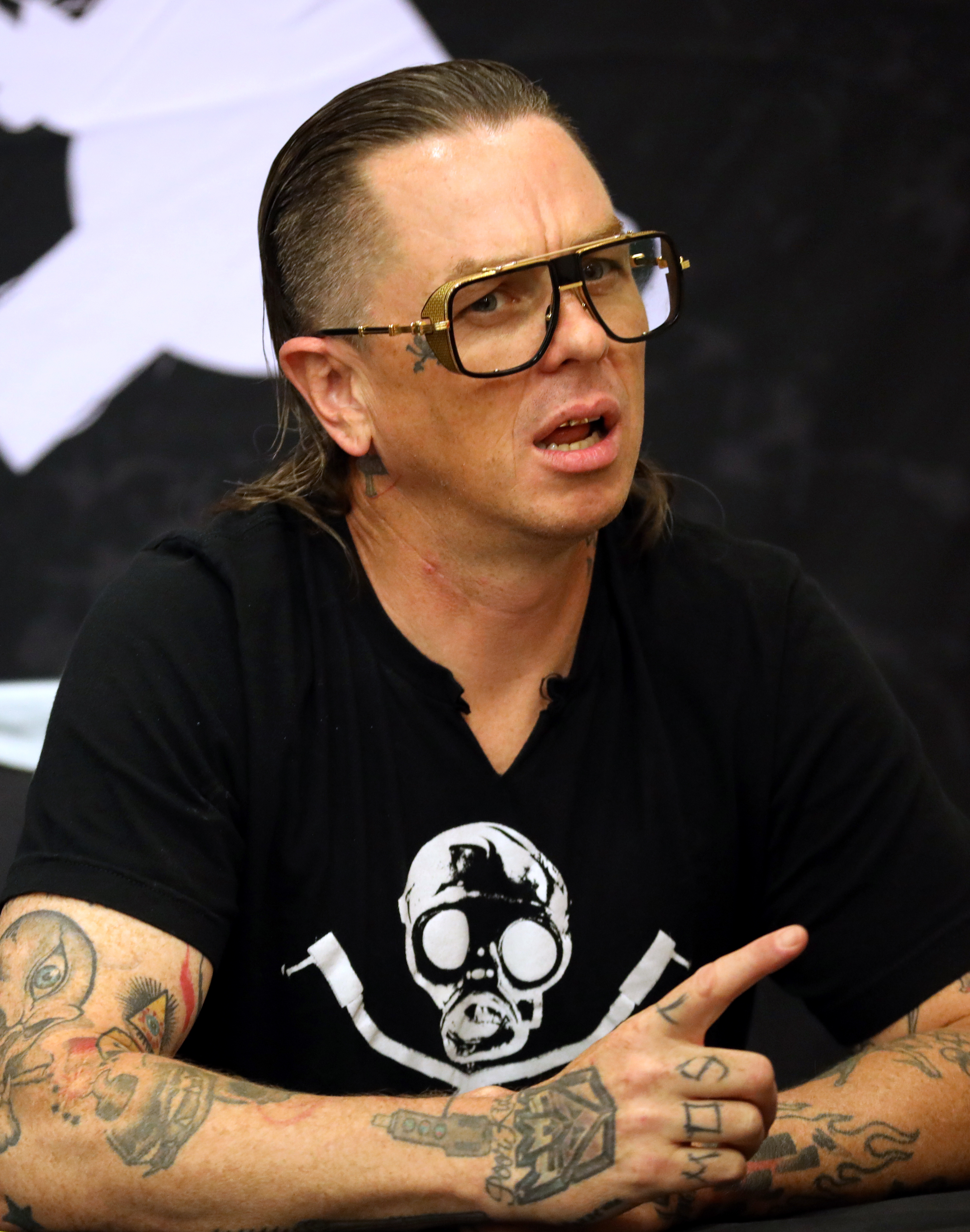
- Wilson in 2024

Background information
- Also known as: #0; DJ Starscream; Ratboy
- Born: Sidney George Wilson; January 20, 1977 (age 49); Des Moines, Iowa, U.S.
- Genres: Nu metal; alternative metal; drum and bass; electronica; hip-hop; jungle; dubstep
- Occupations: DJ; keyboardist; rapper
- Instruments: Turntables; keyboards; synthesizer; sampler
- Years active: 1992–present
- Labels: Roadrunner; N2O; Nuclear Blast; sidthe3rd productions
- Formerly of: Slipknot

Sidney George Wilson (born January 20, 1977) is an American DJ and keyboardist and turntablist. He is best known for being the former DJ and keyboardist for the heavy metal band Slipknot, in which he was designated #0, until his firing from the band on August 14, 2026.

== Biography ==
Wilson was born in Des Moines, Iowa. Both of his parents are from England.

He performed in the American band Slipknot, and also tours as DJ Starscream, a name which is derived from the Transformers character of the same name. He is a fan of the Transformers franchise, and has Transformer tattoos. Musically within Slipknot, Wilson contributed scratching, sound effects, horrorlike noises as well as background noises/effects. When numbers were being assigned to each band member, he insisted on being the number zero since it epitomized filth. He was also known to stage dive in Slipknot's early years, and in 2008, he broke both his heels when he jumped ten feet from the stage. On July 31, 2026, TMZ reported that Wilson was permanently removed from Slipknot, although without confirmation by the band or Wilson himself. Band member Jim Root stated about the report, "Don’t believe everything you read." On August 14, 2026, Slipknot announced that they had parted ways with Wilson; however, the post was deleted shortly afterwards.

Outside Slipknot, Wilson has made a following in Japan as a jungle musician, under the pseudonym DJ Starscream, and is signed to the Japanese record label N2O Records. He collaborated with The Mad Capsule Markets vocalist Hiroshi Kyono on a song called "HAKAI (Destroy)" released on The Songs for Death Note the movie〜the Last name Tribute〜, a tribute album dedicated to the live action movie for the second Death Note film. A remix of the track also appeared on the Wagdug Futuristic Unity mini-album Nu Riot and 2008 album Hakai.

In August 2010, he toured with his solo band SID of which he is the lead vocalist. The band's debut album SID was released on September 13, 2011, via digital download. In 2013 he was a support act for Vamps at their shows in Los Angeles and New York.

== Mask ==
During his time with Slipknot, Wilson's mask has been, for the most part, based on gas masks. His first mask worn for the release of Slipknot was a British Civil Duty gas mask, which had been customized with the front filter being removed, as well as the glass lenses. It has become synonymous with the DJ ever since he adopted it in 1999. During the tour for Iowa, he wore gas masks that had been customized to resemble skulls. During the Subliminal Verses World Tour, Wilson grew his hair long and began to wear various masks that simply resembled skulls, shying away from the gas-mask concept. In promotional photos for All Hope Is Gone and the tour for the album, Wilson changed his mask once again, this time, to resemble a robot, dedicated also for his love of the Transformers franchise. Later, he once again cut his hair short, this time into a Fauxhawk style, and dyed it red. The eyebrows of the mask are able to be animatronically controlled, allowing him to make various expressions. After the death of bassist Paul Gray in 2010, and during the subsequent Memorial World Tour, Wilson, in keeping with the rest of the band, reverted to his old mask and red jump suit, worn during the self-titled album tour, as a tribute to Gray.

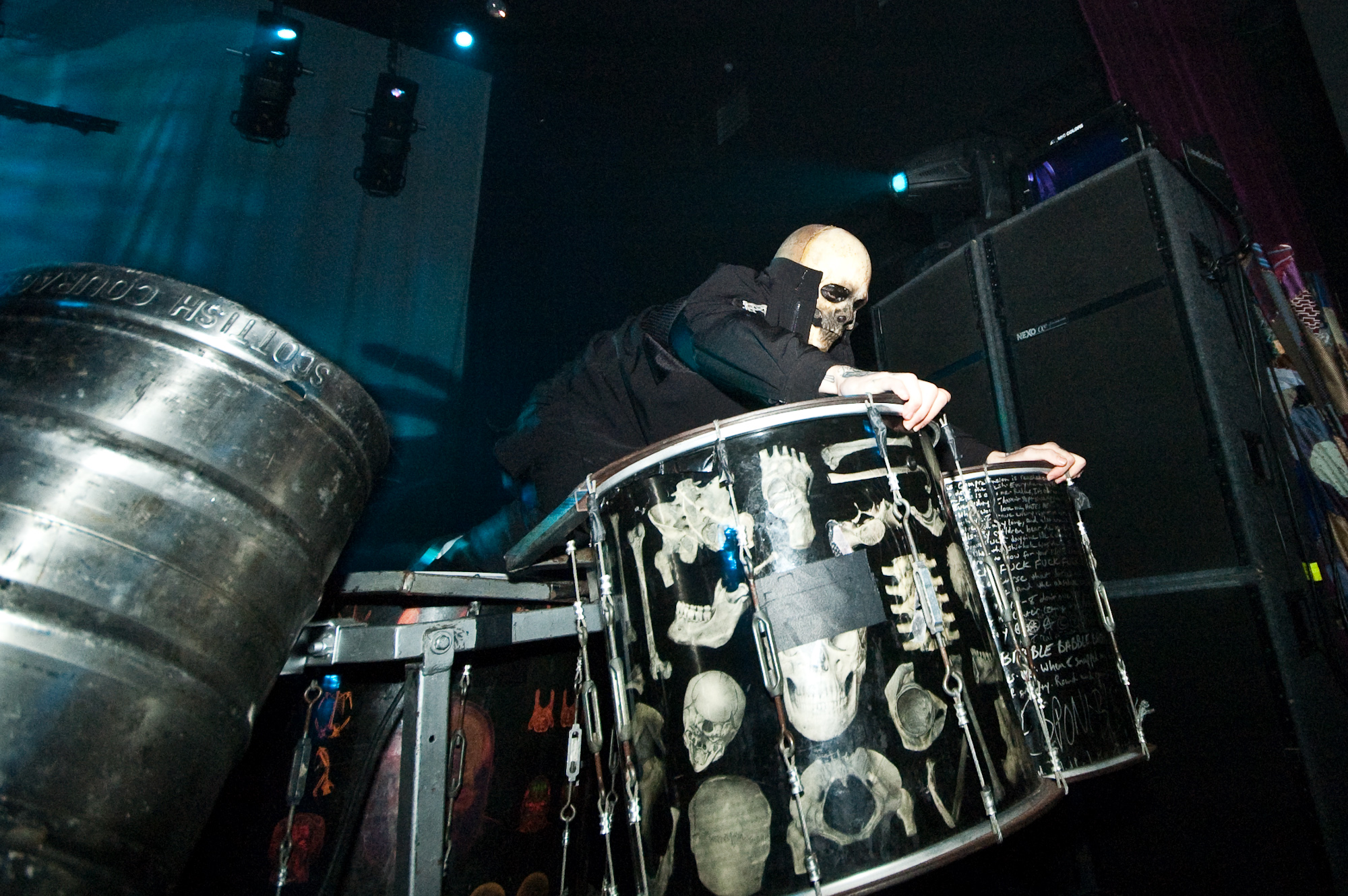
Wilson with Slipknot in 2005

In 2013, Wilson announced a new mask which he debuted over the weekend at Ozzfest Japan in Tokyo. The mask was made by Ukrainian design studio Bob Basset. This and the subsequent masks made by Basset are all made of leather and have a style reminiscent of his earlier gas masks. The music video for Slipknot's single "The Devil in I" from their 2014 album .5: The Gray Chapter, features a mask with circular eye holes similar to those from his Iowa era mask, however these are covered by metal grills that resemble spatulas. The mask also has a removable metal plate that can be placed over the mouth, in which he has a sharp golden grill. Wilson's mask was drastically changed once again for the release of Slipknot's sixth album We Are Not Your Kind, becoming an animatronic death mask of his own face, covered partly by a large black hood and robe. This mask drew significant attention, though mostly positive, for being a drastic leap from the designs of any previous Slipknot masks and for being reminiscent of Emperor Palpatine or a slasher villain. Additionally, Wilson is also responsible for designing other members' original masks, such as Craig Jones's astronaut space helmet with long nails hammered through it, creating Chris Fehn's long-nosed liar mask, and Jim Root's jester mask.

== Personal life ==
Wilson met and became friends with Kelly Osbourne at 1999's Ozzfest; the two were confirmed to be in a romantic relationship not long after Wilson's 45th birthday in 2022. They had a son in late 2022. In July 2025, they became engaged after he proposed backstage at her father Ozzy Osbourne's final concert with Black Sabbath. In March 2026, it was reported that Wilson and Osbourne had ended their engagement.

== Discography ==
=== With Slipknot ===
- Slipknot (1999)
- Iowa (2001)
- Vol. 3: (The Subliminal Verses) (2004)
- All Hope Is Gone (2008)
- .5: The Gray Chapter (2014)
- We Are Not Your Kind (2019)
- The End, So Far (2022)

=== With Look Outside Your Window ===
- 2026: Look Outside Your Window

=== As DJ Starscream ===
- 1996: Starscream Throwback Mix
- 2003: Full Metal Scratch-It
- 2003: Abunaii Sounds – Tataku On Your Atama
- 2005: Sound Assault
- 2005: Live at Konkrete Jungle New York City
- 2006: The New Leader
- 2008: This Is Full Metal Jungle Vol.1
- 2017: King of the Jungle Vol.1 (with N8 Loc, Tony Markham, SK da' Junglist)

=== As SID ===
- 2011: SID
- 2011: Repeat (with Keen)
- 2018: Sexcapades of the Hopeless Robotic
- 2019: Sexcapades of the Hopeless Robotic, Vol.2

=== With The Miami Vice Sound Crack ===
- 2012: Wac Tape
- 2015: The Wac Tape (DJ Wonder Remix)

=== Other appearances ===
- 2002: Stone Sour (Stone Sour) turntables on tracks 2, 3 and 6
- 2004: The Pre-Fix for Death (Necro)
- 2006: The Songs for Death Note the movie〜the Last name Tribute〜 (with Hiroshi Kyono)
- 2006: Modern Primitive Punk (KCUF)
- 2006: None Of Us Are Saints (Lab 4)
- 2007: Natas Productions (Rob Gee)
- 2007: Nu Riot (Wagdug Futuristic Unity)
- 2007: Jambsaw AKA Izzy Starchild & The Psychedelic Rose Live From Moonbase One Studios.
- 2008: Impaled By Metal! Split (Impaler/Black Market Fetus) (recorded, mixed and mastered the Black Market Fetus portion)
- 2008: Says...... (Rob Gee)
- 2008: Hakai (Wagdug Futuristic Unity)
- 2009: "A Song for Chi" (Fieldy)
- 2009: "Legal Drug Addict" (thekeenone) as a producer
- 2010: "Sample of A Solution" (Blue Felix) as a producer
- 2010: AlienNation (Agony Of Defeat) (appears on the track T.S.S. (DIS))
- 2011: Staple Foods (The 113th DJ)
- 2012: "End of Us" (Prozak) from the album "Paranormal"
- 2013: "Rock N Roll" (Avril Lavigne) (appears in the video as Sgt. Terror)
- 2013: "The Underworld ft. La Coka Nostra, Tech N9ne, Army of the Pharaohs, Bizarre, Swifty McVay, Goondox, King Gordy & Sid Wilson" (Reel Wolf Presents) as a rapper
- 2013: "Planning a Murder ft. So Sick Social Club & Sid Wilson" (Reel Wolf Presents) as a rapper
- 2014: "Hello Darkness" (Big Herc) as producer
- 2014: "Use and Abuse (ft. DJ Starscream)", an Avatar song on the album Hail the Apocalypse
- 2015: 10K (10,000 Cadillacs) turntables on tracks 5 and 8
- 2015: "Timing Is Everything" (King Magnetic) from the album "Timing is Everything"
- 2015: "Bukowski" (Semi Hendrix)
- 2016: "Hail the Villains" feat. Psych Ward, Mr. Hyde, Necro, and Sid Wilson (Reel Wolf Presents) as a rapper
- 2017: "Frag Out" feat. Baby Eazy E, Young Dirty Bastard, Mike ADHD, Bizarre, and Sid Wilson as a rapper
- 2018: "Wanna Be Younk" (7ever) as a rapper (producer Nika Finch)
- 2019: "SPC Skeath" (Crumbzilla)
- 2019: "The Real Hardcore" (Schoolly D)
- 2019: "Mood Swings" (Lucifena)
- 2019: "Born Calizeans" (Krooked Treez)
- 2020: "Walking With Lions" (Jamo Gang)
- 2020: "I'm Not Clearing Shxt" (Ras Kass) as producer
- 2024: "It All Comes Down" (Kaosis)

== Filmography ==
- 1999: Welcome to Our Neighborhood
- 2002: Disasterpieces
- 2002: Rollerball
- 2006: Voliminal: Inside the Nine
- 2008: Nine: The Making of "All Hope Is Gone"
- 2009: Of the (sic): Your Nightmares, Our Dreams
- 2010: (sic)nesses
- 2011: Goat
- 2016: Blood Bath
- 2016: Officer Downe
- 2017: Day of the Gusano: Live in Mexico
- 2021: Paradise City
