= 020120 =

Live album by The Mad Capsule Markets
- Released: April 10, 2002 (Japan); April 25, 2005 (UK)
- Recorded: January 20, 2002
- Venue: Zepp Tokyo
- Genre: Digital hardcore
- Labels: Victor, Speedstar (Japan); GUT Records (UK)
- Producer: The Mad Capsule Markets

The Mad Capsule Markets chronology
010 (2001)	020120 (2002)	Cistm Konfliqt... (2004)

020120 is the first live album from The Mad Capsule Markets. It was recorded live on January 20, 2002, at Zepp Tokyo. The performance was the final performance of the 010 album tour. The music consists of material from the Osc-Dis and the 010 albums, and a higher tempo version of Kami-Uta as an encore track. On the intro tape, the show opens with Crass' song Gotcha (who inspired the band in their earlier days). The UK version issued the live DVD alongside the CD with a slightly altered track listing from the Japanese version (there was no Kami Uta and Interview on the DVD); it also helped establish an international audience for the Mad Capsule Markets.

== Track listing ==
1. "Introduction 010"
2. "Come"
3. "Chaos Step"
4. "Gaga Life"
5. "Jam!"
6. "Out/Definition"
7. "Good Girl"
8. "All The Time In Sunny Beach"
9. "Midi Surf"
10. "Kumo"
11. "Bit Crusherrrr"
12. "No food, Drink, or Smoking"
13. "This is the Mad Style"
14. "Good Day"
15. "Fly High"
16. "R.D.M.C"
17. "Tribe"
18. "Pulse"
19. "神Kami-Uta歌"
20. "Island"
