= 4 Plugs =

Studio album by the Mad Capsule Markets
- Released: 24 January 1996
- Recorded: 1995; Sound Sky Kawana studio Victor studio
- Genres: Industrial metal, rap metal, hardcore punk
- Length: 38:16
- Labels: Victor, Invitation
- Producer: The Mad Capsule Market's

The Mad Capsule Markets chronology
Park (1994)	4 Plugs (1996)	The Mad Capsule Market's (1996)

Singles from 4 Plugs
- 1. "Kami-uta (神Kami-uta歌, God Song)" Released: December 16, 1995; 2. "WALK! (JAPAN MIX)" Released: March 23, 1996

4 Plugs is the sixth album by the Mad Capsule Markets. The album has been known as a turning point in the band's career as it was a departure from the original melodic Japanese rock and punk sound to a more rap metal-based style. The melodious elements heard on Mix-ism and Park are largely gone, the sole exception being "Normal Life", replaced by aggressive and heavy beats. Most fans welcomed this newer sound and style, and the band attracted a new fanbase; however, some fans of their earlier sound felt disappointed with their new direction.

This album also featured almost fully English songs such as "Walk!" and "Don't Suss Me Out".

== Track listing ==
No.	Title	Length
1.	"Possess in Loop"	3:56
2.	"Crack"	3:33
3.	"Kami-uta (神Kami-uta歌, God Song)"	3:35
4.	"Rust Off System"	1:24
5.	"Walk!"	3:24
6.	"Normal Life (ノーマルライフ, Normal Life)"	6:52
7.	"Another Plug"	1:02
8.	"S.H.Ō.D.O.K.U. (消毒 S・H・O・D・O・K・U, Disinfect)"	3:35
9.	"A・S・M・I・A・S・B"	3:18
10.	"PGM On"	1:36
11.	"Don't Suss Me Out"	2:44
12.	"Destruction at the Door"	3:10
13.	"O・U・T"	5:24

== Charts ==
Year	Chart	Position
1996	Official Japanese Album Charts	10
