= Doping Panda =

Japanese rock group

- Origin: Japan
- Genres: Rock
- Years active: 1997–2012; 2022–present
- Labels: Diwphalanx; Niw!; Gr8!
- Members: Yutaka Furukawa; Taro Houjou; Hayato Beat
- Website: www.dopingpanda.com

Doping Panda was a Japanese rock group. They are part of Sony Music Japan's gr8 records! division, which includes bands such as Orange Range, Uverworld and Boom Boom Satellites. They released their first album "Performation" in 2001, and a second "PINK PANK" in 2002. Their third album, “We in Music” was released in 2004. In 2005, Doping Panda released two albums entitled "High Fidelity", and "High Pressure". After being received very well by the Japanese Rock scene, the group went on a series of tours throughout the country, releasing their 2006 album "Dandyism", along with the hit singles "Miracle" and "Can't Stop Me". Their success solidified their status as an icon in the Japanese music scene and increased their fanbase throughout Asia.

Following up on their earlier successes, the band released their first DVD entitled "Live-Ism" in October 2006. On January 24, 2007, their new single "Can't Stop Me" was released. On June 6 of the same year they released an EP titled "High Brid", and on the 15th they appeared on the popular Japanese music program Music Station for the first time, and played the song "I'll be there" from their new EP. In 2012, they announced their breakup with their final live.

== Discography ==
=== Albums ===
==== Studio albums ====
| Title | Album details | Peak | Track listing |
| Title | Album details | JPN | Track listing |
|---|---|---|---|
| Performation | Released: 24 July 2001; Label: Diwphalanx Records; Formats: CD | — | Track listing: 1. "Mayonnaise On My Toast"; 2. "An Oldster"; 3. "Broken Mirror"; 4. "Let Me Free"; 5. "Dirty Body"; 6. "Fine By Me"; 7. "Me, Dogs & Mother Mary"; 8. "Everything Under the Sun"; 9. "Oh my Esperansa |
| Pink Pank | Released: 7 June 2002; Label: Diwphalanx Records; Formats: CD | — | Track listing: 1. "The Way to You"; 2. "Tabloid Pubrock"; 3. "Transient Happiness"; 4. "Don't Stop Your Melodies"; 5. "Ballade"; 6. "Candy House" |
| We in Music | Released: 5 May 2004; Label: Niw! Records; Formats: CD | 48 | Track listing: 1. "Introgical (We in Music)"; 2. "Start Me Up"; 3. "Mr. Superman"; 4. "Uncoverd"; 5. "Party Song"; 6. "Lovers Soca"; 7. "Interlude"; 8. "Turn of the Silence"; 9. "DHA-DHI-DHA"; 10. "Stairs"; 11. "One Foot Out My Life" |
| Dandyism | Released: 5 April 2006; Label: Gr8! Records; Formats: CD, CD+DVD | 18 | Track listing: 1. "High Pressure"; 2. "Introck"; 3. "Blind Falcon"; 4. "Miracle"; 5. "The Fire (Alarmix)"; 6. "Get You"; 7. "Moralist"; 8. "Hi-Fi"; 9. "I'll Give (This Happy Time For You)"; 10. "Snow Dance"; 11. "Tell Me My Speaker Box"; 12. "Teenage Dandyism" |
| Dopamaniacs | Released: 12 March 2008; Label: Gr8! Records; Formats: CD, CD+CD-ROM | 18 | Track listing: 1. "A.O.D. (Anthem of Dopamania)"; 2. "Nothin'"; 3. "I'll Be There (Connected to Next ver.)" 4. "Call My Name"; 5. "We Won't Stop"; 6. "Thunder"; 7. "Good Bye to Heroes"; 8. "Coffee High (One More Cup)"; 9. "Summer Song"; 10. "Crazy"; 11. "Way Back"; 12. "Kiss My Kiss" |
| Decadence | Released: 3 June 2009; Label: Gr8! Records; Formats: CD, CD+DVD | 23 | Track listing: 1. "Introduction"; 2. "Decadence"; 3. "Majestic Trancer feat. Verbal"; 4. "Beautiful Survivor"; 5. "Lost & Found feat. Toru Hidaka"; 6. "Crazy One More Time"; 7. "The Idiot"; 8. "The Edge of Outside"; 9. "Beat Addiction"; 10. "Gaze At Me"; 11. "Standin' in the Rain"; 12. "I Was Just Watchin' You" |
| Yellow Funk | Released: 13 April 2011; Label: Gr8! Records; Formats: CD | 57 | Track listing: 1. "The Anthem"; 2. "I Said"; 3. "You Can Change the World"; 4. "Because of the Love"; 5. "Song for my Harmonics"; 6. "Catastrophe"; 7. "De la Papa"; 8. "Love Song"; 9. "The Miracle" |

==== Compilation albums ====
| Title | Album details | Peak | Track listing |
| Title | Album details | JPN | Track listing |
|---|---|---|---|
| The Best of Doping Panda | Released: 19 January 2011; Label: Sony Music Records; Formats: CD | 43 | Track listing: 1. "Beautiful Survivor"; 2. "I'll Be There"; 3. "Crazy"; 4. "Nothin'"; 5. "Majestic Trancer feat. Verbal"; 6. "We Won't Stop"; 7. "Crazy One More Time"; 8. "Lost & Found feat. Toru Hidaka"; 9. "Moralist"; 10. "The Fire (Alarmix)"; 11. "Transient Happiness"; 12. "Hi-Fi"; 13. "Miracle"; 14. "Beat Addiction" |

==== Remix albums ====
| Title | Album details | Track listing |
|---|---|---|
| Remixes For 3 Years | Released: 19 September 2003; Label: Niw! Records; Formats: CD | Track listing: 1. "Game" (Remixed by Cubismo Grafico); 2. "Tabloid Pubrock" (Your Song Is Good); 3. "Let Me Free" (Remixed by Doping Panda); 4. "Candy House" (Remixed by Halfby) |

=== Extended plays ===
| Title | EP details | Peak | Track listing |
| Title | EP details | JPN | Track listing |
|---|---|---|---|
| Pink Pank | Released: 7 June 2002; Label: Diwphalanx Records; Formats: CD | — | Track listing: 1. "The Way to You"; 2. "Tabloid Pubrock"; 3. "Transient Happiness"; 4. "Don't Stop Your Melodies"; 5. "Ballade"; 6. "Candy House" |
| High Fidelity | Released: 13 April 2005; Label: Gr8! Records; Formats: CD | 33 | Track listing: 1. "YA YA"; 2. "Judgment Day"; 3. "Hi-Fi"; 4. "Take Me Your Paradise"; 5. "Just in Time" |
| High Pressure | Released: 31 August 2005; Label: Gr8! Records; Formats: CD | 29 | Track listing: 1. "Naked"; 2. "The Fire"; 3. "Selfish Morning Anniversary"; 4. "Sea Side Club Music"; 5. "Riot Against The Control" |
| High Brid | Released: 6 June 2007; Label: Gr8! Records; Formats: CD, CD+DVD | 29 | Track listing: 1. "Hybrid Breeder"; 2. "I'll Be There"; 3. "Shine"; 4. "Always Away"; 5. "It's My Life" |
| Anthem | Released: 4 November 2009; Label: Gr8! Records; Formats: CD, CD+DVD | 37 | Track listing: 1. "Anthem"; 2. "The Mugendai Dance Time"; 3. "I Said Enough for One Night"; 4. "Lady"; 5. "Music You Like" |
| High Hopes | Released: 12 April 2023; Label: Sony Music; Formats: CD | 38 | |

=== Singles ===
| Title | Year | Peak | Album |
| Title | Year | JPN | Album |
|---|---|---|---|
| "Dream Is Not Over" | 2000 | — | Non-album single |
| "Miracle" | 2006 | 38 | Dandyism |
| "The Fast Soul God All (Reason)" | 2006 | — | Non-album singles |
| "Can't Stop Me" | 2007 | 41 | Non-album singles |
| "Crazy" | 2007 | 32 | Dopamaniacs |
| "Beautiful Survivor" | 2008 | 23 | Decadence |
| "Majestic Trancer feat. Verbal" | 2008 | 24 | Decadence |
| "Beat Addiction" | 2009 | 44 | Decadence |
| "Can I Close To You" | 2010 | — | Non-album single |
