= Capsule Soup =

EP by The Mad Capsule Markets
- Released: 22 July 1992
- Recorded: Summer 1992
- Genres: Hardcore punk, industrial
- Length: 20:50
- Labels: Victor, Invitation
- Producer: The Mad Capsule Markets

The Mad Capsule Markets chronology
P.O.P (1991)	Capsule Soup (1992)	Speak!!!! (1992)

Capsule Soup (カプセル・スープ) is an EP by The Mad Capsule Markets. The band starts to show experimentation with this release, such as the use of samplers. "Bach Sleeps" is a cover version of Bach's Fugue for Organ in G Minor.

== Track listing ==
1. "Bach Sleeps." – 1:59
2. "Self Control" (セルフコントロール, Self Control) – 3:01
3. "G・M・J・P" – 4:22
4. "Kanojo no Knife" (彼女のKnife, Her Knife) – 3:21
5. "Marmotto" (モルモット, Guinea Pig) – 3:11
6. "Jesus Is Dead." – 4:52

== Charts ==
Year	Chart	Position
1992	Official Japanese Albums Chart	77
