= Humanity (The Mad Capsule Markets album) =

Studio album by The Mad Capsule Markets
- Released: October 1, 1990, and December 18, 1996
- Recorded: May 1990; Yamanaka lake studio (Japan)
- Genre: Hardcore punk
- Length: 34:32
- Label: Insect Noise
- Producer: The Mad Capsule Markets

The Mad Capsule Markets chronology
Humanity (1990)	P.O.P (1991)

Humanity is the debut album from Japanese hardcore punk group The Mad Capsule Markets. They later re-released the album in 1996, and this was the only full album that guitarist Minoru Kojima played on. This album contains the original version of the songs "San Byoukan no Jisatsu" and "Life Game", which both appear in censored form on the album "P.O.P". The original version of "San Byoukan no Jisatsu" contains an extra line in the chorus about jumping off a building. It was never made certain why the line was removed on "P.O.P", but it was speculated that the song was linked to Japanese teen suicide, and therefore censored on "P.O.P" and has been totally silenced on the re-release of "Humanity" and releases thereafter. The band or record company would later erase any further reference of it from on the insert for the re-release of "Humanity"; also, the word "Jisatsu" (suicide) on the track list has been scribbled out.

The original pressing of the album came with a free newspaper clipping, which had lyrics and photos of the band. The lyrics where otherwise later reprinted in P.O.P or the re-released version of the album.

== Track listing ==
1. "Sanbyoukan no Jisatsu" (三秒間の自殺, Three Second Suicide) – 2:27
2. "Ayatsuri Ningyou" (あやつり人形, Marionette) – 2:54
3. "Life Game" – 4:06
4. "Giragira" (ギラギラ, Shine) – 2:16
5. "Sanbika" (讃美歌, Hymn) – 3:14
6. "Humanity" – 3:19
7. "Kanzume no Naka" (カンヅメの中, In a Tin Can) – 2:28
8. "Dou shiyou mo nai Hito no Uta" (どうしようもない~~恋~~人の唄, Hopeless Person's Song) – 4:38
9. "Dear Houkousha Tengoku no Minasama" (Dear歩行者天国の皆様, Dear Street Fair Goers) – 2:15
10. "La~la~la~ (Boku ga Usotsuki ni Natta Hi)" (ラ・ラ・ラ (僕がウソつきになった日), La~la~la~ (The Day I Became a Liar)) – 2:15
11. "Dandan" (だんだん, Bit by bit) – 4:16
12. "Nijyuu byou" (20秒, Twenty Seconds) – 0:20
