= P.O.P =

1991 studio album by the Mad Capsule Markets

Studio album by The Mad Capsule Markets
- Released: November 21, 1991
- Recorded: Winter, 1991
- Genre: Hardcore punk
- Length: 26:51
- Labels: Victor, Invitation CD: VICL-243
- Producer: The Mad Capsule Markets

The Mad Capsule Markets chronology
Humanity (1990)	P.O.P (1991)	Capsule Soup (1993)

Alternative cover
- Alternative artwork for P.O.P.

P.O.P is the second album by The Mad Capsule Markets and their major label debut. It was a faster, thrashier effort than their debut album Humanity; it also featured new guitarist Ai Ishigaki.

== Track listing ==
1. "Human Protest" – 1:17
2. "Sanbyoukan no" (3秒間の.., Three Second) – 1:46
3. "Gichi" (ギチ, Nut) – 1:51
4. "Mad Chuudoku" (Mad中毒, Mad Poison) – 1:42
5. "Harinezumi to XX" (ハリネズミとXX, XX With a Hedgehog) – 2:53
6. "Ayatsuri ningyo" (あやつり人形, Marionette) – 2:55
7. "Life Game" – 3:57
8. "Karakuri no soko" (カラクリの底, Trick's Bottom) – 2:38
9. "Yourself Look!!" – 3:29
10. "People Is Destroy of Mind" – 1:50
11. "White Low Child" – 2:26

== Charts ==
Year	Chart	Position
1990	Official Japanese Albums Chart	100
