= Speak!!!! =

Studio album by The Mad Capsule Markets
- Released: November 21, 1992
- Length: 40:00
- Labels: Victor, Invitation
- Producer: The Mad Capsule Markets

The Mad Capsule Markets chronology
| Capsule Soup (1991) | Speak!!!! (1992) | Mix-ism (1994) |

Speak!!!! is the third album from The Mad Capsule Markets. The album was recorded in England. Two songs were featured from the original Berrie recording. The album displayed a more experimental and darker side to their music, which is evident in the closing song "Kachiku". It was also their first album to have a full English song ("Solid State Survivor", originally by YMO).

== Track listing ==
1. "Mass Media" (マスメディア, Mass Media)
2. "Public Revolution"
3. "System Error" (システム・エラー, System Error)
4. "Kenryoku no Inu" (権力の犬, Leader of the Pack)
5. "Underground Face"
6. "Solid States Survivor"
7. "Kikenbunshi <Danger Boy>" (危険分子 <Danger Boy>, Dangerous Elements)
8. "Care-Less Virus"
9. "Chesu no Heitai" (チェスの兵隊, Pawn of Chess)
10. "4 Junk 2 Pop"
11. "D-Day"
12. "Government Wall"
13. "Kachiku" (家畜, Domesticated)

== Charts ==
| Year | Chart | Position |
|---|---|---|
| 1992 | Official Japanese Albums Chart | 61 |
