= Ai Ishigaki =

Japanese musician

- Also known as: ISHIG∀KI
- Born: December 25, 1970 (age 55)
- Origin: Yokohama, Japan
- Genres: Punk rock
- Instrument: Guitar
- Years active: 1990 to 2021
- Website: http://www.redblood.com

Ai Ishigaki (also known as 'ISHIG∀KI' born 25 December 1970) was the guitarist for The Mad Capsule Markets (MCM) from 1990 to 1996. He got the job as support guitarist after being a roadie for MCM in the Berrie days. Ishigaki debuted on their Thrash-Punk album P.O.P, “It was a whirlwind experience—I went from hanging around with bandmates after school to debuting professionally within months,” he told Visual Music Japan (VMJ) in an interview with Mandah Frénot.

While originally a composer, his early contributions were overshadowed by the band’s internal structure. His stylistic identity, however, became increasingly pronounced by the time of the 1992 album Speak!!!!, and he credited a pivotal meeting with Atsushi Sakurai (BUCK-TICK) as a catalyst for embracing his own aesthetic and creative voice.

After leaving the band in 1996, Ishigaki deepened his collaboration with Ryoichi Endo (ex-Soft Ballet) in the solo project ends, co-arranging and composing on their second album SPACY (1997).

“Despite being labeled as a solo project, it had more of a band dynamic. There wasn’t a clear distinction—we created together.”

From the late 1990s through the 2010s, Ishigaki worked as a sought-after supporting guitarist, performing with Tomoyasu Hotei, who was an ex-member of Japanese rock group Boøwy , DEMON KAKKA, Maki Ohguro, and Kōji Kikkawa, among others. While these collaborations were often initiated by offers from other artists, he left a distinctive mark on each.

“I never saw myself as a lifelong musician. Music was simply the language I used to communicate who I was at the time.”

In the 2010s, Ishigaki also pursued his own band projects, including ROCKSTEADY and Derailers (DRLS). While both were short-lived, he expressed regret over not asserting himself more creatively, especially in ROCKSTEADY, and a desire for more live performances with MUNEHIRO and DRLS.

In 2021, Ishigaki officially announced his retirement from music, choosing to step away while still successful in his career.
