= Osc-Dis =

Studio album by The Mad Capsule Markets
- Released: 25 August 1999 (Japan); 18 August 2001 (US); 30 August 2001 (UK)
- Recorded: Kawaguchi-Ko Studio, Japan
- Genres: Digital hardcore, industrial metal, rapcore, pop punk
- Length: 40:59
- Labels: JVCKenwood Victor Entertainment, Invitation, (Japan) PalmRyko, Palm Entertainment (US/UK)
- Producer: The Mad Capsule Markets

The Mad Capsule Markets chronology
Digidogheadlock (1997)	Osc-Dis (1999)	010 (2001)

Professional ratings
Review scores
Source	Rating
AllMusic	4.5/5 stars
Blender	3/5 stars
Drowned in Sound	8/10
The Encyclopedia of Popular Music	4/5 stars
Pitchfork	8.2/10
Rock Sound	4.5/5 stars

Osc-Dis or Oscillator in Distortion is the eighth album by Japanese band The Mad Capsule Markets. It was released in Japan in 1999 and released outside Japan in 2001. Osc-Dis was the band's breakthrough album; it also gained recognition for the band overseas, with the single "Pulse". The album mixes industrial metal, industrial rock and punk rock with various kinds of electronic music. It was more melodic than their previous album and included elements of pop punk. There are vocal contributions from Hirosuke from Balzac, Yamada from Geronimo, and Katsya from NND. This album also saw the birth of the band's mascots The White Crusher and The Cyborn.

The song "Pulse" appears on the in-game soundtrack to Tony Hawk's Pro Skater 3 and in Jonny Moseley Mad Trix.

== Track listing ==
No.	Title	Length
1.	"Tribe"	4:05
2.	"Out/Definition"	2:50
3.	"Pulse"	3:18
4.	"Multiplies"	3:29
5.	"Mob Track"	1:48
6.	"All the Time in Sunny Beach"	2:19
7.	"Island"	4:38
8.	"Restart!"	2:31
9.	"Jag"	3:49
10.	"Step into Yourself"	4:48
11.	"Good Girl"	3:43
12.	"MIDI Surf"	3:35

Other versions include a digipak with a bonus DVD including videos for "Tribe", "Pulse", "All the Time in Sunny Beach", "Good Girl", "MIDI Surf", and "Systematic"

Year	Chart	Position
1999	Official Japanese Album Charts	9
