= Hiroshi Kyono =

Japanese singer

Kyono
- Born: Hiroshi Kiyono; March 31, 1969 (age 57)
- Origin: Yokohama, Japan
- Genre: Digital hardcore
- Instrument: Vocalist
- Years active: 1985–present
- Website: www.wagdug.com

Hiroshi Kyono (born Hiroshi Kiyono; March 31, 1969, in Yokohama, Japan) is the former vocalist for The Mad Capsule Markets.

== Early years ==
Kyono claims that in his earlier years he frequently watched MTV, and in high school he started listening to Japanese punk like Gauze, The Stalin, Inu, and Aburadako. Then he ventured out into overseas punk like Crass and The Pop Group. Kyono also states that the first record that he bought was not very "punk inspired" as it was Electric Light Orchestra's Secret Messages. In 1985 he started the Boowy inspired punk group Berrie with his high school friend Minoru Kojima (aka Shin.), and the group later was joined by bassist Takeshi Ueda and Seto. The group performed their first show during their senior year of school and were ventured out to Tokyo and Shinjuku. His image at this time was very punk and glam inspired and would often switch from a loud abrasive punk voice to very melodic.

=== The Mad Capsule Markets years ===
After Berrie had opened for the likes of The Red Hot Chili Peppers, Berrie became The Mad Capsule Markets. The early incarnation of mad was still very much Boowy inspired, as Kyono and the band were still very interested in the band. After years of further punk inspired material, the heavy 4 Plugs album was released. This was a big change for Kyono, as he had been listening to the likes of Fear Factory and hip hop music. Kyono's voice had become slightly gruffer, he often rapped rather than sang, and he sported skateboarder-esque clothing and a no longer had long hair. This style (and musical) change was well received by the fans, and Kyono's music taste became eclectic over the years.

=== Later years ===
Since the release of OSC DIS, his popularity as a vocalist increased, and he contributed vocals to several of Joujouka's songs, Sasori's Sasori and The Crystal Method's Weapons Of Mad Distortion (which was featured during the Dracula/Blade fight scene in Blade: Trinity). When The Mad Capsule Markets were put on hiatus on 31 March 2006 (Kyono announced this on his birthday) Kyono created the WAG DUG unity website where he often posts diary entries of his latest DJ livesets in Japan and work on other projects, such as the wag dug clothing line. His recent musical activity includes appearing on the Death Note movie soundtrack with a song he contributes vocals to called HAKAI (Deathtroy). This track also features Sid Wilson of Slipknot fame.

== Wagdug Futuristic Unity ==
In 2007, Kyono released a mini album Nu Riot under the name of Wagdug Futuristic Unity. The album is considered as Kyono's solo project and not a new band as it featured guest appearances as opposed to a constant line up throughout the tracks. Guest appearances include; Shitdisco, Ultra Brain, Motor, DJ Starscream and Cycheouts G.

In June 2008, Kyono announced that a full-length album Hakai will be released on July 23, 2008. The first single will be "Systematic People" and will feature Ryo of Maximum the Hormone. "Systematic People" has also been used as the opening theme for the anime series Kurozuka (novel). In the same fashion as Nu Riot, the album will have guest appearances. This time, they include Justice, Chino Moreno (of Deftones), Ceephax, Numanoid vs. Mazda, funky gong (of joujouka), and the return of Sid Wilson and Ultra Brain.

Wagdug Futuristic Unity has since released the follow-up albums R.A.M (Radical Abstraction of Minority) and RAW as an actual band as opposed to the digital hardcore sound earlier material has had, and as from 2012 to 2013, Kyono has collaborated with the likes of DJ Baku to release the collaborative album "Unknown Music Allianz" and is a member of the Metalcore super group T.C.L (The Chunk Legend) which featured former Undown members TORUxxx and Yamada, to release the album Tremendous CLassixx.

== Discography ==
=== KYONO ===
Albums

- YOAKE (October 17, 2018)
- S.A.L (October 21, 2020)

=== Wagdug Futuristic Unity ===
Albums

- Hakai (July 23, 2008)
- R.A.M. (September 29, 2010)
- ЯAW (April 27, 2011)

EPs

- Nu Riot (October 24, 2007)
- Destroy the Destruction -Mash Up & Remixes- (December 3, 2008)

Singles

- "Ill Machine" (September 26, 2007)
