= Motokatsu Miyagami =

Japanese drummer

Motokatsu Miyagami (Japanese: 宮上 元克, Hepburn: Miyagami Motakatsu; born 1 February 1969 in Tokyo) is a Japanese musician, best known as drummer of the band The Mad Capsule Markets from 1990 until their disbandment in 2006. In an interview with Mandah Frénot for VMJ, Motakatsu has described his childhood as "wild" – having 4 brothers. He started playing the drums at around 10 years old. He is currently the drummer for Ace of Spades.

== Career ==
Motokatsu replaced former Berrie drummer Seto in The Mad Capsule Markets before the band's first release, August 1990's "Government Wall".

He also plays in a side-project called Rally, with members of Glay and Thee Michelle Gun Elephant. They first appeared with a cover song for the 2005 Buck-Tick tribute album, Parade -Respective Tracks of Buck-Tick-.

On 7 August 2023, it was announced that Motokatsu had joined Gastunk as their new drummer but parted ways on March 15, 2025 due to financial and artistic differences.
