= The Mad Capsule Markets =

Japanese band

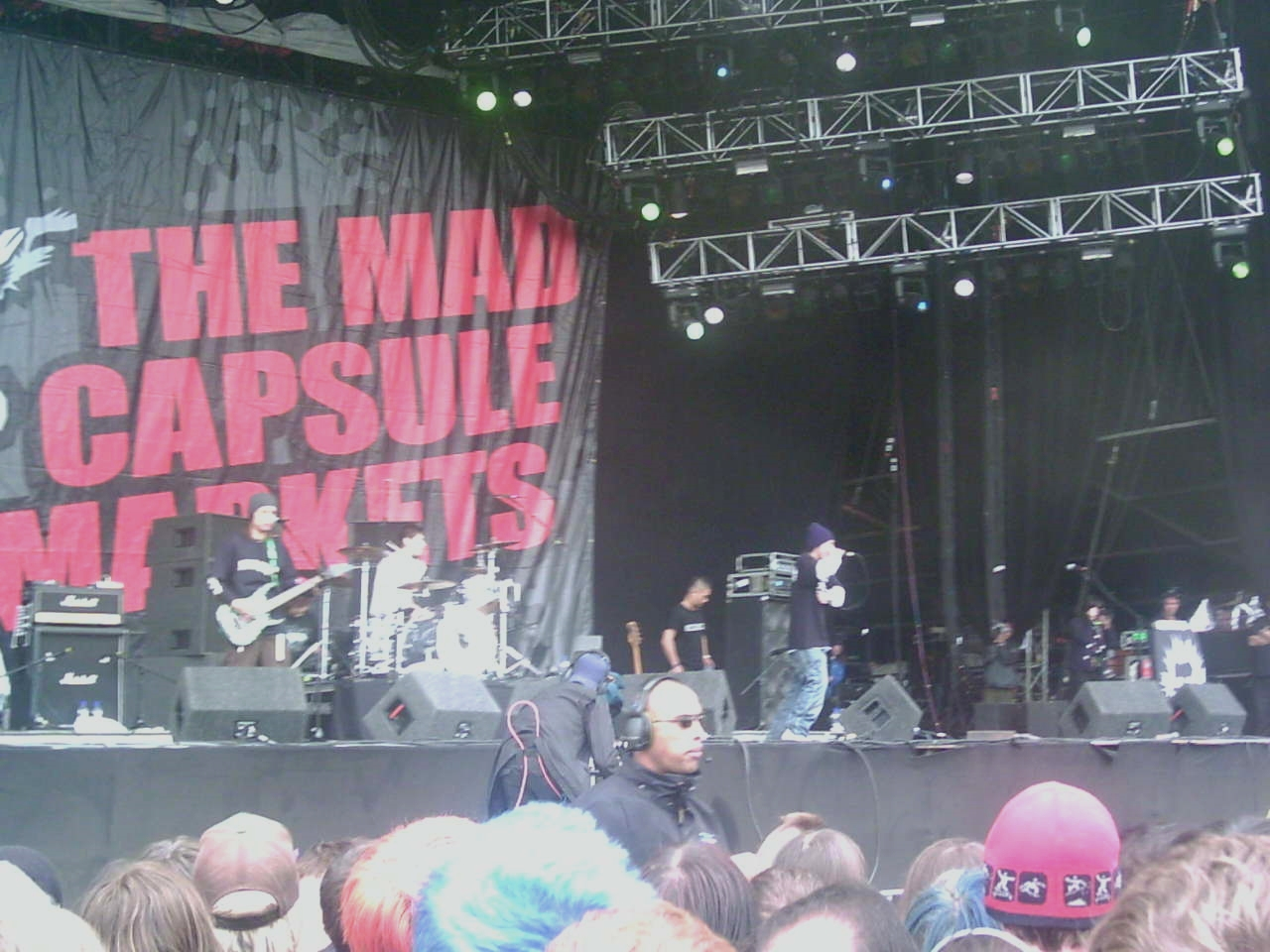
- The band at Download Festival 2005

Background information
- Origin: Yokohama, Japan
- Genres: Experimental rock; digital hardcore; hardcore punk; rapcore; electropunk; industrial metal; nu metal
- Years active: 1985–2006
- Labels: Insect Noise (1990); Victor/Invitation (1990–2004); Sony Music Japan (2005–2006)
- Past members: Hiroshi Kyono; Takeshi Ueda; Motokatsu Miyagami; Seto; Minoru Kojima; Ai Ishigaki

The Mad Capsule Markets (originally known as The Mad Capsule Market's and Berrie) were a Japanese experimental rock band that formed in 1985 and were active until 2006. The band became known for their experimental style, which melded various kinds of electronic music and punk rock.

== Biography ==
=== Berrie (1985–1990) ===
In 1985, while in high school, vocalist and songwriter Hiroshi Kyono and guitarist Minoru Kojima formed the punk band Berrie. One year later, the duo were joined by bassist Takeshi Ueda and drummer "Seto", at which point the quartet began performing at concerts and entering Battle of the Bands competitions. The band recorded a three-song demo tape entitled Poison Revolution, which they distributed themselves. (Two of these three songs were later re-released on the Speak!!! album.) Their popularity in the Japanese underground music scene steadily grew and in 1990 this success earned them a place as the opening act for the Red Hot Chili Peppers. However, within months of the performance, drummer "Seto" left the band, and was replaced by Tokyo resident Motokatsu Miyagami. In April 1990, Berrie changed its name to The Mad Capsule Market's, purportedly a term for distributors of Betaphenethylamine, a fictional drug from the cyberpunk novel Neuromancer.

=== Early years (1990–1996) ===
In August 1990, the new band released their first single, "Government Wall", a re-recording of the Berrie song. In October, they released their debut album, Humanity, which also featured a number of Berrie songs and retained their punk sound. After the album's release, original guitarist Minoru Kojima left the band, and was replaced by former roadie Ai Ishigaki. The following year, The Mad Capsule Markets signed to major record label Victor Entertainment and recorded their second album, P.O.P. A faster and harder album than their first, it was heavily censored, provoking outrage from the band members. Their earlier lyrical content, with the lyrics, written mostly by bassist Takeshi Ueda, had Marxist/working-class influences, with lyrical themes becoming more and more political with later releases. From 1990 their sound was mainly punk influenced but quickly began to incorporate different influences in their music by the likes of Killing Joke, Aburadako, The Stalin and Yellow Magic Orchestra.

From 1992 onwards the band began to experiment with their sound, introducing various sampling machines and New Wave sounds. In 1992 they recorded the EP Capsule Soup and their third album Speak!!!!. In 1993, their fourth album Mix-ism leaned more towards ska, and in 1994 their fifth album Park demonstrated a slower and more melodic style. This was also the first album to be released overseas (in the United States, although almost two years after its Japanese release).

Recorded and produced in the US, their 1996 album 4 Plugs saw a musical shift towards metal. Although the band retained its style of rock with electronic influences, the music was darker and heavier. Vocalist Kyono also altered his singing style and began rapping in English occasionally. This marked the beginning of the major stylistic change that would be demonstrated on subsequent recordings. Takashi Fujita joined the band as an additional live guitarist for the subsequent tour.

Later that year, the band released The Mad Capsule Market's, a greatest hits compilation containing re-recorded songs from their career up to that point. Following its release, guitarist Ai Ishigaki left the band. Instead of recruiting an official replacement guitarist, the band opted to continue as a trio, with guitar being performed by support guitarist "TORUxxx".

=== Stylistic change and international recognition (1997–2005) ===
Perhaps boosted by the change in guitarist, The Mad Capsule Markets' sound became heavier still. In 1997 they released their second international album and eighth overall, Digidogheadlock. A strong progression from 4 Plugs, electronica came to the forefront and the music had a great deal in common with industrial metal.

Also in 1997, the band performed at the American music festival South by Southwest as part of the Japan Nite event.

In 1999 the band released their most internationally recognized album to date. Osc-Dis (Oscillator in Distortion) was a more poppy or melodic take on the sound of Digidogheadlock. It was released worldwide in 2001, driven by the hugely popular single "Pulse", which featured on the video game Tony Hawk's Pro Skater 3. The song and the album became the group's most well known outside Japan. At this time the band also introduced their robotic "mascots" the White Crusher and Black Cyborn.

The Mad Capsule Markets' tenth album, 010, was released in 2001 and demonstrated all the styles that they had explored previously, with a stronger emphasis on electronica. This produced a record which sounded more diverse than those before it. In 2002 the band also released a live album entitled 020120, after the date of the performance.

In 2004 the band produced their most recent studio album, Cistm Konfliqt... (pronounced "System Conflict"). The album was a return to the heaviness of Digidogheadlock, but this heaviness was filtered through the electronic experimentation of the previous two albums, maintaining a strong link with digital hardcore. The UK release of Cistm Konfliqt... in 2005 saw the band's popularity there grow, with rock magazine Kerrang! inviting them to play numerous concerts. Japanese mixed martial arts fighter Takanori Gomi uses the track "Scary" for his entrance theme.

In 2005, The Mad Capsule Markets broke from longtime record label Victor/Invitation and signed to Sony Music Japan. They released two greatest hits compilations of songs spanning their entire career, these were entitled 1990–1996 and 1997–2004.

On April 5 the band announced that they were taking an 'extended break' from making music under the Mad Capsule Markets' name and instead work on separate projects. They posted this on the official Japanese site:

"Thank you so much for big support for us. This time, after our discuss with 3 guys from the band, we decide to take an extended break as the band. We can't decide when we can re-start again as the band, at this point. Each from the band plans to work as individual artist/projects, please keep supporting us from now on. thank you."

== Band members ==
=== Final lineup ===
- Hiroshi Kyono – vocals (1985–2006)
- Takeshi Ueda – bass, programming, backing vocals (1985–2006)
- Motokatsu Miyagami – drums/percussion (1990–2006)

=== Former members ===
- Seto – drums (1985–1990)
- Minoru Kojima a.k.a. "Shin Murohime" – guitar (1985–1991; live support 2004–2005)
- Ai Ishigaki – guitar, backing vocals (1991–1996)

=== Support members ===
- Takashi Fujita – guitar, backing vocals (1995–1996)
- TORUxxx – guitar, backing vocals (1997–2004)
- K-A-Z – guitar, backing vocals (2004–2005)

== Discography ==
- Humanity (1990)
- P.O.P (1991)
- Speak!!!! (1992)
- Mix-ism (1994)
- Park (1994)
- 4 Plugs (1996)
- Digidogheadlock (1997)
- Osc-Dis (1999)
- 010 (2001)
- Cistm Konfliqt... (2004)
