= List of music venues in the United States =

This is a list of music venues in the United States. Venues with a capacity of 1,000 or higher are included.

== List ==
=== Alabama ===
| Opened | Venue | City | Capacity |
|---|---|---|---|
| 2022 | Sand Mountain Amphitheatre | Albertville | 5,000 |
| September 2019 | Gogue Center for the Performing Arts | Auburn | 4,500 (Ham Amphitheatre); 1,204 (Woltosz Theatre) |
| November 2010 | Neville Arena | Auburn | 10,621 |
| 1988 | Bessemer Civic Center | Bessemer | 2,000 |
| 1929 | Iron City | Birmingham | 1,300 |
| 1996 | Alys Robinson Stephens Performing Arts Center | Birmingham | 1,330 |
| December 26, 1927 | Alabama Theatre | Birmingham | 2,500 |
| September 28, 1976 | Birmingham–Jefferson Convention Complex | Birmingham | 1,000 (Theater); 2,835 (Concert Hall); 19,000 (Legacy Arena) |
| 1924 | Boutwell Auditorium | Birmingham | 5,000 |
| Fall 2021 | Protective Stadium | Birmingham | 47,100 |
| 1927 | Legion Field | Birmingham | 71,594 |
| 1987 | Bill Harris Arena | Birmingham | 5,000 |
| 2025 | Coca-Cola Amphitheater | Birmingham | 9,300 |
| December 3, 1988 | Bartow Arena | Birmingham | 8,508 |
| 1976 | Wright Center | Birmingham | 2,500 |
| October 18, 2007 | Pete Hanna Center | Homewood | 4,974 |
| December 2, 1999 | Daphne Civic Center | Daphne | 1,700 (General Admission); 1,450 (Seated) |
| 1974 | Dothan Civic Center | Dothan | 3,100 |
| 2000 | National Peanut Festival Grounds | Dothan | 3,700 (BankPlus Arena); 12,400 (Allin Amphitheater); 3,000 (ALFA Event Center) |
| 1963 | Rip Hewes Stadium | Dothan | 10,000 |
| 2020 | The Crossing at Big Creek Amphitheater | Cottonwood | 6,000 |
| 2010 | Enterprise Civic Center | Enterprise | 1,500 |
| 1958 | Enterprise Performing Arts Center | Enterprise | 1,800 |
| 1948 | The Shoals Theatre | Florence | 1,166 |
| 1969 | Norton Auditorium | Florence | 1,500 |
| 1972 | CB&S Bank Arena | Florence | 3,000 |
| 2023 | Venue at Coosa Landing | Gadsden | 1,092 |
| 1935 | Mort Glosser Amphitheater | Gadsden | 1,600 |
| March 14, 1975 | Von Braun Center | Huntsville | 9,000 (Propst Arena); 1,955 (Smith Concert Hall); 1,575 (Mars Music Hall) |
| May 2022 | Orion Amphitheatre | Huntsville | 8,000 |
| October 2, 1948 | Ladd–Peebles Stadium | Mobile | 50,000 |
| October 1999 | Mitchell Center | Mobile | 10,800 (Arena-full house); 7,354 (Arena-Front of stage); 2,800 (Theater) |
| January 1927 | Saenger Theatre | Mobile | 1,921 |
| 1975 | The Grounds Mobile | Mobile | 4,800 (Hocklander Hall); 12,000 (Grandstand) |
| October 1953 | Garrett Coliseum | Montgomery | 12,500 |
| 2008 | Montgomery Performing Arts Center | Montgomery | 1,800 |
| 1918 | Davis Theater | Montgomery | 1,200 |
| 1995 | Riverwalk Amphitheater | Montgomery | 6,000 |
| 1992 | Dunn-Oliver Acadome | Montgomery | 7,400 |
| 1922 | Cramton Bowl | Montgomery | 25,000 |
| 1996 | Louis Crews Stadium | Normal | 21,000 |
| 2022 | Alabama A&M Events Center | Normal | 6,000 |
| 1987 | Opelika Center for the Performing Arts | Opelika | 1,150 |
| 2006 | The Wharf Amphitheater | Orange Beach | 10,000 |
| May 2013 | Oxford Performing Arts Center | Oxford | 1,200 |
| 1975 | Ozark Civic Center | Ozark | 3,600 |
| 1997 | Pelham Civic Center | Pelham | 4,100 |
| 2011 | Phenix City Amphitheatre | Phenix City | 3,000 |
| 2010 | Northeast Alabama Agri-Business Center | Rainsville | 5,500 |
| April 2, 2011 | Mercedes-Benz Amphitheater | Tuscaloosa | 8,410 |
| 1968 | Coleman Coliseum | Tuscaloosa | 14,487 |

=== Alaska ===
| Opened | Venue | City | Capacity |
|---|---|---|---|
| September 5, 2014 | Alaska Airlines Center | Anchorage | 5,000 |
| February 8, 1983 | Sullivan Arena | Anchorage | 8,700 |
| 1988 | Alaska Center for the Performing Arts | Anchorage | 2,056 (Atwood Concert Hall) |
| 1984 | Egan Center | Anchorage | 2,540 (Explorers Hall) |
| 1953 | West Auditorium | Anchorage | 1,918 |
| June 13, 1990 | Carlson Center | Fairbanks | 6,539 |
| 1955 | Hering Auditorium | Fairbanks | 1,200 |
| 1999 | Borealis Theatre | Palmer | 5,000 |
| 2004 | Menard Sports Center | Wasilla | 3,500 |

=== Arizona ===
| Opened | Venue | City | Capacity |
|---|---|---|---|
| 2010s | Anderson Auto Group Fieldhouse | Bullhead City | 6,750 |
| 1983 | Rawhide Event Center | Chandler | 6,000 |
| 1989 | Chandler Center for the Arts | Chandler | 1,508 |
| 1977 | Walkup Skydome | Flagstaff | 15,000 |
| 2006 | Pepsi Amphitheatre | Flagstaff | 3,000 |
| 1973 | Ardley Memorial Auditorium | Flagstaff | 1,350 |
| unknown | Mojave Crossing | Fort Mohave | 5,300 |
| 2010 | Higley Center for the Arts | Gilbert | 1,231 |
| December 26, 2003 | Desert Diamond Arena | Glendale | 19,000 |
| August 1, 2006 | State Farm Stadium | Glendale | 63,400 |
| Spring 2025 | VAI Resort Amphitheater | Glendale | 11,000 |
| 2005 | Ikeda Theater | Mesa | 1,588 |
| June 6, 1992 | Mortgage Matchup Center | Phoenix | 17,716 (Arena); 4,379 (Theater) |
| November 3, 1965 | Arizona Veterans Memorial Coliseum | Phoenix | 14,870 |
| November 11, 1990 | Talking Stick Resort Amphitheatre | Phoenix | 20,106 |
| March 31, 1998 | Chase Field | Phoenix | 49,033 |
| September 1, 2011 | Global Credit Union Arena | Phoenix | 7,000 |
| April 11, 2002 | Arizona Financial Theatre | Phoenix | 5,000 |
| 1929 | Orpheum Theatre | Phoenix | 1,364 |
| 1972 | Phoenix Symphony Hall | Phoenix | 2,387 |
| 1972 | Phoenix Convention Center | Phoenix | 4,200 |
| 1963 | Celebrity Theatre | Phoenix | 2,650 |
| 2017 | The Van Buren | Phoenix | 1,800 |
| September 18, 1964 | ASU Gammage | Tempe | 3,017 |
| April 29, 1974 | Desert Financial Arena | Tempe | 14,198 |
| 1993 | Marquee Theatre | Tempe | 2,500 |
| October 4, 1958 | Mountain America Stadium | Tempe | 53,599 |
| 1992 | Lee Performing Arts Center | Prescott | 1,064 |
| November 2006 | Findlay Toyota Center | Prescott Valley | 6,200 (Full house); 4,074(Half-house) |
| 2010s | Diamond Center | Sahuarita | 2,000 |
| 1987 | WestWorld of Scottsdale | Scottsdale | 6,756 |
| 1992 | Klein Center for the Performing Arts | Sierra Vista | 1,308 |
| 2021 | Vista Center for the Arts | Surprise | 1,286 |
| 1971 | Tucson Convention Center | Tucson | 8,962 (Arena); 2,289 (Theater) |
| 1998 | Kino Veterans Memorial Stadium | Tucson | 16,000 |
| 1932 | Tucson Rodeo Grounds | Tucson | 16,000 |
| April 22, 1937 | Centennial Hall | Tucson | 2,500 |
| April 11, 1930 | Fox Tucson Theatre | Tucson | 1,197 |
| 1922 | Rialto Theatre | Tucson | 1,200 |
| 2001 | Anselmo Valencia Amphitheatre | Tucson | 4,400 |
| unknown | Tucson Expo Center | Tucson | 7,000 (East and West Halls combined); 1,700 (South Hall) |
| November 11, 2011 | Casino del Sol Event Center | Tucson | 2,000 |
| 1969 | Desert Sun Stadium | Yuma | 15,000 |

=== Arkansas ===
| Opened | Venue | City | Capacity |
|---|---|---|---|
| 1952 | Barton Coliseum | Little Rock | 10,000 |
| 2013 | First Security Amphitheatre | Little Rock | 8,375 |
| 1939 | Robinson Center | Little Rock | 2,222 |
| 1948 | War Memorial Stadium | Little Rock | 54,120 |
| unknown | Connor Performing Arts Center | Little Rock | 1,800 |
| 2006 | Jack Stephens Center | Little Rock | 5,600 |
| October 2, 1999 | Simmons Bank Arena | North Little Rock | 18,000 |
| unknown | Benton Event Center | Benton | 1,800 |
| December 7, 1972 | Farris Center | Conway | 5,500 |
| 2015 | Clark Auditorium | Conway | 1,502 |
| 2010s | Reynolds Performance Hall | Conway | 1,200 |
| May 23, 1937 | Waldran Auditorium | Conway | 1,073 |
| 1992 | Baum Walker Hall | Fayetteville | 1,201 |
| November 1993 | Bud Walton Arena | Fayetteville | 20,344 (Full Arena); 10,000 (Lower bowl) |
| September 24, 1938 | Donald W. Reynolds Razorback Stadium | Fayetteville | 76,212 |
| unknown | Ozark Music Hall | Fayetteville | 2,000 |
| July 11, 1987 | First National Bank Arena | Jonesboro | 11,209(Arena); 2,200 (Convo Theatre) |
| 2014 | Walmart Arkansas Music Pavilion | Rogers | 11,000 |
| 2022 | Springdale Performing Arts Center | Springdale | 2,043 |
| June 27, 1976 | Pine Bluff Convention Center | Pine Bluff | 8,500 (Arena); 2,000(Arena theater); 1,899(Auditorium) |
| 2005 | Fort Smith Convention Center | Fort Smith | 4,800 (Exhibit Hall Arena); 1,331 (ArcBest Performing Arts Center) |
| 1949 | Harper Stadium | Fort Smith | 9,000 (Center stage); 7,000 (End stage) |
| 2003 | Bank OZK Arena | Hot Springs | 8,000 |
| 2000 | Timberwood Amphitheatre | Hot Springs | 5,000 |
| 1965; renovated 2003 | Horner Hall | Hot Springs | 1,850 |
| Summer 2021 | Oaklawn Event Center | Hot Springs | 1,500 |
| unknown | Russellville Center for the Arts | Russellville | 1,875 |
| 1980 | Benson Auditorium | Searcy | 3,500 |
| unknown | White County Fair Arena | Searcy | 5,490 |
| unknown | West Memphis Civic Auditorium | West Memphis | 1,031 |

=== California ===
| Opened | Venue | City | Capacity |
|---|---|---|---|
| 1998 | City National Grove of Anaheim | Anaheim | 1,700 |
| 2017 | House of Blues | Anaheim | 2,200 |
| June 19, 1993 | Honda Center | Anaheim | 19,578 |
| April 19, 1966 | Angel Stadium | Anaheim | 45,050 |
| 1966 | Anaheim Convention Center Arena | Anaheim | 7,500 |
| 2012 | Performing Arts Center | Arcadia | 1,163 |
| 1962 | Dignity Health Theater | Bakersfield | 3,000 |
| 2007 | Spectrum Amphitheatre | Bakersfield | 4,000 |
| October 1, 1998 | Dignity Health Arena | Bakersfield | 10,400 |
| 1990s | Icardo Center | Bakersfield | 3,500 |
| December 25, 1930 | Fox Theater | Bakersfield | 1,500 |
| unknown | Kern County Fair and Event Center | Bakersfield | 3,600 (805 Grandstand); 3,000 (Budweiser Pavilion) |
| 1903 | Greek Theatre | Berkeley | 8,500 |
| 1968 | Zellerbach Hall | Berkeley | 1,978 |
| June 3, 1950 | Berkeley Community Theater | Berkeley | 3,491 |
| September 19, 1930 | Saban Theatre | Beverly Hills | 2,000 |
| June 1, 2003 | Dignity Health Sports Park | Carson | 27,000 |
| Spring 2021 | Cathedral City Community Amphitheater | Cathedral City | 4,500 |
| 1993 | Cerritos Center for the Performing Arts | Cerritos | 1,934 |
| 1931 | Laxson Auditorium | Chico | 1,200 |
| July 21, 1998 | North Island Credit Union Amphitheatre | Chula Vista | 20,500 |
| 1981 | Industry Hills Expo Center | City of Industry | 5,000 |
| 1932 | Bridges Auditorium | Claremont | 2,500 |
| May 1975 | Toyota Pavilion at Concord | Concord | 12,500 |
| July 29, 1983 | Pacific Amphitheatre | Costa Mesa | 8,042 |
| 1986 | Segerstrom Center for the Arts | Costa Mesa | 3,000(Segerstrom Hall); 2,000(Segerstrom Concert Hall) |
| 2002 | Mondavi Center | Davis | 1,800 |
| 1977 | University Credit Union Center | Davis | 6,000 |
| April 1941 | Cow Palace | Daly City | 16,500 |
| 2019; renovated 2024 | The Magnolia | El Cajon | 1,200 |
| 2019 | Sycuan Event Center | El Cajon | 1,200 |
| unknown | Cannon Theatre for the Performing Arts | El Centro | 1,100 |
| 1994 | California Center for the Arts | Escondido | 1,523 |
| October 8, 1946 | Redwood Bowl | Arcata | 9,000 |
| October 3, 2008 | Lumberjack Arena | Arcata | 2,775 |
| October 11, 1966 | Selland Arena | Fresno | 11,300 |
| October 11, 1966 | Valdez Hall | Fresno | 2,500 |
| November 27, 2003 | Save Mart Center | Fresno | 16,182 |
| November 15, 1980 | Valley Children's Stadium | Fresno | 41,031 |
| 1984 | Rotary Amphitheater | Fresno | 4,000 |
| October 14, 1966 | William Saroyan Theatre | Fresno | 2,391 |
| 1928 | Warnors Theatre | Fresno | 2,100 |
| 1983 | Paul Paul Theater | Fresno | 4,701 |
| September 22, 1958 | Theodore Roosevelt Auditorium | Fresno | 2,141 |
| 1932 | Fullerton Auditorium | Fullerton | 1,221 |
| unknown | Glendale Performing Arts Center | Glendale | 1,559 |
| September 4, 1925 | Alex Theatre | Glendale | 1,400 |
| 1923 | Ramona Bowl | Hemet | 5,400 |
| 2007 | The Fonda Theatre | Hollywood | 1,200 |
| June 4, 1930 | Pantages Theatre | Hollywood | 2,703 |
| November 9, 2001 | Dolby Theatre | Hollywood | 3,400 |
| October 31, 1940 | Hollywood Palladium | Hollywood | 5,000 |
| 2000 | Indian Wells Tennis Garden | Indian Wells | 17,000 |
| December 21, 2004 | Fantasy Springs Special Events Center | Indio | 3,700 |
| 1987 | Empire Polo Club | Indio | 90,000 |
| August 9, 2021 | YouTube Theater | Inglewood | 6,000 |
| December 30, 1967 | Kia Forum | Inglewood | 17,505 |
| July 25, 2020 | SoFi Stadium | Inglewood | 70,240 |
| August 15, 2024 | Intuit Dome | Inglewood | 18,000 |
| January 8, 1987 | Donald Bren Events Center | Irvine | 5,960 |
| August 2024 | Great Park Live | Irvine | 10,000 |
| 1944 | Salinas Valley Fairgrounds | King City | 6,400 (Rava Equestrian Center); 4,400 (Topo Ranch Center) |
| 1988 | Baldwin Pavilion | Lakeport | 5,100 |
| September 1977 | La Mirada Theatre for the Performing Arts | La Mirada | 1,261 |
| February 17, 2023 | The Venue at Thunder Valley | Lincoln | 4,500 |
| 1962 | Terrace Theater | Long Beach | 3,051 |
| 1962 | Long Beach Arena | Long Beach | 13,500 |
| 1994 | Carpenter Performing Arts Center | Long Beach | 1,074 |
| 1926 | Wilson Auditorium | Long Beach | 1,620 |
| November 7, 2014 | Regent Theater | Los Angeles | 1,100 |
| November 11, 1926 | The Belasco | Los Angeles | 1,500 |
| 1927 | The Theatre at Ace Hotel | Los Angeles | 1,600 |
| 1990 | Mayan Theater | Los Angeles | 1,700 |
| 1929 | Royce Hall | Los Angeles | 1,800 |
| February 15, 1926 | Orpheum Theatre | Los Angeles | 2,000 |
| June 1965; remodeled 2012 | Pauley Pavilion | Los Angeles | 13,800 |
| October 24, 2003 | Walt Disney Concert Hall | Los Angeles | 2,265 |
| 1921 | Bovard Auditorium | Los Angeles | 1,220 |
| November 9, 2008 | The Novo by Microsoft | Los Angeles | 2,300 |
| November 7, 1931 | The Wiltern | Los Angeles | 2,300 |
| September 25, 1930 | Greek Theatre | Los Angeles | 5,870 |
| 1926 | Shrine Auditorium and Expo Hall | Los Angeles | 6,300 |
| October 18, 2007 | Peacock Theater | Los Angeles | 7,100 (full-house); 4,500 (minimum) |
| September 27, 1964 | Dorothy Chandler Pavilion | Los Angeles | 3,197 |
| October 12, 2006 | Galen Center | Los Angeles | 10,258 |
| July 11, 1922 | Hollywood Bowl | Los Angeles | 17,376 |
| October 17, 1999 | Crypto.com Arena | Los Angeles | 20,000 |
| April 18, 2018 | BMO Stadium | Los Angeles | 22,000 |
| September 17, 1959 | Dodger Stadium | Los Angeles | 56,000 |
| May 1, 1923 | Los Angeles Memorial Coliseum | Los Angeles | 77,500 |
| 1980s | Yard at California Plaza | Los Angeles | 6,000 |
| 1967 | Ahmanson Theatre | Los Angeles | 2,103 |
| October 31, 1931 | Merced Theatre | Merced | 1,185 |
| 2024 | Chicken Ranch Casino Amphitheatre | Modesto | 3,500 |
| September 27, 2007 | Gallo Center for the Arts | Modesto | 1,246 (Mary Stuart Rogers Theater); 440 (Foster Family Theatre) |
| unknown | Modesto High School Auditorium | Modesto | 1,268 |
| August 6, 1926 | Golden State Theatre | Monterey | 1,300 |
| unknown | Monterey County Fair and Event Center | Monterey | 10,000 (Pattee Arena General Admission); 5,800 (Pattee Arena Reserved); 2,500 (Payton Stage) |
| 1986 | Shoreline Amphitheatre | Mountain View | 22,500 |
| unknown | Ironstone Amphitheatre | Murphys | 7,000 |
| 2002 | Moreno Arena | Norco | 6,200 |
| 2016 | The Soraya | Northridge | 1,700 |
| 1928 | Fox Oakland Theatre | Oakland | 2,800 |
| 1931 | Paramount Theatre | Oakland | 3,040 |
| November 9, 1966 | Oakland Arena | Oakland | 20,000 |
| 1964 | Temple Hill Auditorium | Oakland | 1,600 |
| 1915 | Kaiser Center for the Arts | Oakland | 5,492 (Kaiser Arena); 1,500 (Calvin Simmons Theatre) |
| October 18, 2008 | Toyota Arena | Ontario | 11,089 |
| September 2024 | Frontwave Arena | Oceanside | 7,500 |
| March 2016 | Musco Center for the Arts | Orange | 1,044 |
| 1968 | Oxnard Performing Arts Center | Oxnard | 1,608 |
| December 14, 2022 | Acrisure Arena | Palm Desert | 11,007 |
| January 1988 | McCallum Theatre | Palm Desert | 1,127 |
| October 1922 | Rose Bowl | Pasadena | 92,542 |
| 1931 | Pasadena Civic Auditorium | Pasadena | 3,029 |
| 1974 | Ambassador Auditorium | Pasadena | 1,262 |
| 1970 | Sexson Auditorium | Pasadena | 1,964 |
| unknown | Beckman Auditorium | Pasadena | 1,158 |
| 2013 | Vina Robles Amphitheatre | Paso Robles | 3,000 |
| September 11, 1946 | Paso Robles Event Center | Paso Robles | 4,000 (Fort Frontier Stage); 7,587 (Hearst Equestrian Center); 14,661 (Chumash Grandstand Arena) |
| April 24, 1931 | Pomona Fox Theater | Pomona | 2,000 |
| 1994 | Porterville Memorial Auditorium | Porterville | 1,763 |
| 1982 | Murieta Equestrian Center | Rancho Cordova | 5,420 |
| 2001 | The Show | Rancho Mirage | 2,057 |
| 1970 | Redding Civic Auditorium | Redding | 5,000 (Lawn); 2,300 (Auditorium); 1,100 (Half-house) |
| 1921 | Tehama District Fairgrounds | Red Bluff | 9,000 (Rodeo Arena); 4,140 (Pauline Davis Pavilion) |
| 1928 | Clock Auditorium | Redlands | 1,250 |
| May 4, 2017 | Fowler Events Center | Riverside | 6,000 |
| 1928 | Riverside Municipal Auditorium | Riverside | 1,500 |
| January 11, 1929; reopened February 22, 2011 | Fox Performing Arts Center | Riverside | 1,550 |
| 1951 | SAFE Credit Union Performing Arts Center | Sacramento | 2,452 |
| February 1927 | Sacramento Memorial Auditorium | Sacramento | 3,867 |
| 1968 | Cal Expo | Sacramento | 18,000 (Miller Lite Grandstand)4,000 (Show Arena) |
| October 2016 | Golden 1 Center | Sacramento | 17,608 |
| 1969 | Hornet Stadium | Sacramento | 30,000 |
| 1928 | Charles C. Hughes Stadium | Sacramento | 25,000 |
| 2025 | Channel 24 | Sacramento | 2,150 |
| 1996 | Salinas Sports Complex Arena | Salinas | 24,350 |
| 1982 | Glen Helen Amphitheater | San Bernardino | 65,000 |
| 1975 | Orange Pavilion | San Bernardino | 3,600 |
| April 14, 2023 | Yaamava’ Theater | San Bernardino | 3,000 |
| 1995 | Coussoulis Arena | San Bernardino | 5,000 |
| 2005 | House of Blues | San Diego | 1,100 |
| 1924; reopened 2008 | Balboa Theatre | San Diego | 1,339 |
| 1980s | Humphrey's Concerts by the Bay | San Diego | 1,400 |
| 1965 | San Diego Civic Theatre | San Diego | 2,967 |
| 1936 | Starlight Bowl | San Diego | 4,300 |
| 1929 | Jacobs Music Center | San Diego | 2,252 |
| May 3, 1941 | CalCoast Credit Union Open Air Theatre | San Diego | 4,280 |
| August 29, 2019 | The Rady Shell at Jacobs Park | San Diego | 10,000 |
| July 24, 1997 | Viejas Arena | San Diego | 12,414 |
| November 17, 1966 | Pechanga Arena | San Diego | 16,100 (Arena); 5,450 (Amphitheater) |
| October 5, 2000 | Jenny Craig Pavilion | San Diego | 6,000 |
| April 8, 2004 | Gallagher Square | San Diego | 6,000 |
| April 8, 2004 | Petco Park | San Diego | 42,445 |
| August 2022 | Snapdragon Stadium | San Diego | 35,000 |
| 1922 (reopened 1979) | Golden Gate Theatre | San Francisco | 2,297 |
| 1909 | Regency Center | San Francisco | 1,424 |
| 1926 | Orpheum Theatre | San Francisco | 2,203 |
| 1912 | The Fillmore | San Francisco | 1,315 |
| 1922 | Curran Theatre | San Francisco | 1,667 |
| May 13, 1922 | The Warfield | San Francisco | 2,300 |
| September 29, 1958 | SF Masonic Auditorium | San Francisco | 3,481 |
| 1980 | Louise M. Davies Symphony Hall | San Francisco | 2,743 |
| 1932 | War Memorial Opera House | San Francisco | 3,146 |
| 1915 | Bill Graham Civic Auditorium | San Francisco | 8,500 |
| 1922 | Castro Theatre | San Francisco | 1,407 |
| September 2019 | Chase Center | San Francisco | 18,064 |
| April 11, 2000 | Oracle Park | San Francisco | 41,503 |
| 1933 | San Jose Civic | San Jose | 2,850 |
| May 17, 1989 | Provident Credit Union Event Center | San Jose | 5,702 |
| 1927 | California Theatre | San Jose | 1,134 |
| September 7, 1993 | SAP Center | San Jose | 17,496 |
| 1973 | San Jose Center for the Performing Arts | San Jose | 2,691 |
| September 1933; expanded 1980s | CEFCU Stadium | San Jose | 30,433 |
| 1996 | Harold Miossi Hall | San Luis Obispo | 1,286 |
| 1957 | San Mateo County Event Center | San Mateo | 6,628 (Expo hall); 1,500 (Theater) |
| 2016 | San Mateo Performing Arts Center | San Mateo | 1,540 |
| 1971 | Marin County Civic Center | San Rafael | 6,000 (Lagoon Park); 2,001 (Veterans Memorial Auditorium) |
| unknown | Medley Auditorium | Santa Ana | 1,020 |
| 1931 | Arlington Theater | Santa Barbara | 2,000 |
| 1924 | Granada Theatre | Santa Barbara | 1,550 |
| 1979 | UCSB Events Center | Santa Barbara | 6,000 |
| 1936 | Santa Barbara Bowl | Santa Barbara | 4,562 |
| 1962 | Earl Warren Showgrounds | Santa Barbara | 4,700 (Kramer Arena); 1,500 (Exhibit Building) |
| unknown | Minetti Arena | Santa Maria | 6,000 |
| July 17, 2014 | Levi's Stadium | Santa Clara | 68,500 |
| 1940 | Santa Cruz Civic Auditorium | Santa Cruz | 2,021 |
| 1958 | Santa Monica Civic Auditorium | Santa Monica | 3,000 |
| 1936 | Sonoma County Fairgrounds | Santa Rosa | 4,400 (Grace Pavilion); 5,000 (Chris Beck Arena) |
| 1981 | Luther Burbank Center for the Arts | Santa Rosa | 1,612 (Ruth Finley Person Theater); 399 (East Auditorium) |
| 2012 | Green Music Center | Santa Rosa | 1,400 |
| November 2016 | The Event at Graton | Rohnert Park | 1,500 |
| September 16, 2006 | Stanford Stadium | Stanford | 50,000 |
| December 2, 2005 | Adventist Health Arena | Stockton | 12,000 |
| September 9, 1981 | Alex G. Spanos Center | Stockton | 8,000 |
| 1925 | Stockton Memorial Civic Auditorium | Stockton | 2,400 |
| 1930 | Bob Hope Theatre | Stockton | 2,042 |
| June 24, 2002 | Pechanga Casino and Hotel | Temecula | 3,100(Summit Event Center); 1,200(Pechanga Theatre) |
| 1968 | Marsee Auditorium | Torrance | 2,048 |
| Unknown | Farm Credit Dairy Center | Tulare | 7,900 |
| 1982 | Corteva Agriscience Center | Tulare | 6,500 |
| October 2024 | Adventist Health Amphitheatre | Tulare | 6,000 |
| May 1937 | Tulare Community Auditorium | Tulare | 1,362 |
| 1994 | Thousand Oaks Civic Arts Plaza | Thousand Oaks | 1,800 |
| August 1928 | Ventura Theatre | Ventura | 1,200 |
| September 1939 | Ventura High School Auditorium | Ventura | 1,440 |
| 1973 | Visalia Convention Center | Visalia | 3,000 |
| 1930 | Fox Theatre | Visalia | 1,275 |
| June 10, 2000 | Toyota Amphitheatre | Wheatland | 18,500 |
| June 3, 2022 | Hard Rock Live Sacramento | Wheatland | 2,500 |
| 2020 | Pipa Event Center | Winterhaven | 2,300 |
| 1957 | Lincoln Theater | Yountville | 1,200 |

=== Colorado ===
| Opened | Venue | City | Capacity |
|---|---|---|---|
| 1981 | CU Events Center | Boulder | 12,000 |
| 1910; renovated 1986 | Macky Auditorium | Boulder | 2,040 |
| 1898 | Chautauqua Auditorium | Boulder | 1,313 |
| October 11, 1924 | Folsom Field | Boulder | 53,500 |
| September 1978 | Vance Brand Civic Auditorium | Longmont | 1,344 |
| 1982 | El Pomar Great Hall | Colorado Springs | 1,989 |
| 1962 | Falcon Stadium | Colorado Springs | 46,692 |
| 1968 | Cadet Field House | Colorado Springs | 6,800 |
| 1998 | Broadmoor World Arena | Colorado Springs | 9,000 |
| April 1988 | Blocktickets Park | Colorado Springs | 12,500 |
| May 2024 | Ford Amphitheater | Colorado Springs | 8,000 |
| 1923 | Colorado Springs City Auditorium | Colorado Springs | 3,000 |
| September 16, 2021 | Robson Arena | Colorado Springs | 5,107 |
| 1961 | Arnold Hall | Colorado Springs | 2,769 |
| 1940 | Palmer Auditorium | Colorado Springs | 1,447 |
| 1959 | Wasson Campus Auditorium | Colorado Springs | 1,166 |
| unknown | The Broadmoor International Center | Colorado Springs | 1,600 |
| April 7, 2007 | Dick's Sporting Goods Park | Commerce City | 27,000 |
| September 10, 2001 | Empower Field at Mile High | Denver | 76,125 |
| April 20, 1995 | Coors Field | Denver | 50,445 |
| October 1, 1999 | Ball Arena | Denver | 21,000 |
| December 1951 | Denver Coliseum | Denver | 10,200 |
| 1919 | Ogden Theatre | Denver | 1,600 |
| 1930 | Paramount Theatre | Denver | 1,870 |
| 1907; reopened 1986 | Fillmore Auditorium | Denver | 3,700 |
| September 15, 1999 | Magness Arena | Denver | 7,200 |
| March 1, 2005 | Bellco Theatre | Denver | 5,000 |
| 2017 | Levitt Pavilion | Denver | 20,000 (Free shows); 7,500 (paid shows) |
| 1992 | Buell Theater | Denver | 2,839 |
| 1978 | Boettcher Concert Hall | Denver | 2,634 |
| 1908; remodeled 1956, 1992 and 2005 | Ellie Caulkins Opera House | Denver | 2,225 |
| August 17, 2019 | Mission Ballroom | Denver | 3,900 |
| 2011 | The Brighton | Denver | 3,000 |
| 1982 | Fiddler's Green Amphitheatre | Greenwood Village | 18,000 |
| 2006 | Eagle River Center | Eagle | 3,000 |
| 1979 (Expanded 2026) | Dobson Arena | Vail | 3,500 |
| 1990 | Gerald R. Ford Amphitheater | Vail | 2,600 |
| January 27, 1966 | Moby Arena | Fort Collins | 9,725 |
| 1979 | Lincoln Center | Fort Collins | 1,180 |
| August 5, 2017 | Canvas Stadium | Fort Collins | 41,200 |
| 1972 | Bunker Auditorium | Golden | 1,400 |
| 1988 | Monfort Concert Hall | Greeley | 1,686 |
| 2006 | Island Grove Events Center | Greeley | 5,000 |
| 1970 | Island Grove Rodeo Arena | Greeley | 15,000 |
| September 20, 2003 | Blue Arena | Loveland | 7,200 |
| 1923 | Avalon Theatre | Grand Junction | 1,096 |
| 1949 | Suplizio Field | Grand Junction | 15,000 |
| 1949 | Ralph Stocker Stadium | Grand Junction | 12,000 |
| 2004 | Las Colonias Park Amphitheatre | Grand Junction | 4,000 |
| September 2024 | Grand Junction High School | Grand Junction | 2,950 (Gymnasium); 1,654 (Auditorium) |
| unknown | Grand Junction Convention Center | Grand Junction | 1,800 |
| 1928 | Red Rocks Amphitheater | Morrison | 9,525 |
| August 24, 1995 | Southwest Motors Events Center | Pueblo | 8,225 |
| 1919 | Pueblo Memorial Hall | Pueblo | 1,600 |
| 1971; remodeled 2008 | Massari Arena | Pueblo | 4,850 |
| unknown | American Furniture Warehouse Amphitheater | Pueblo | 3,000 |

=== Connecticut ===
| Opened | Venue | City | Capacity |
|---|---|---|---|
| 1998 | Hartford Healthcare Amphitheatre | Bridgeport | 5,700 |
| 2001 | Total Mortgage Arena | Bridgeport | 10,000 |
| 1940 | Klein Memorial Auditorium | Bridgeport | 1,447 |
| 1995 | Feldman Arena | Danbury | 4,500 |
| August 30, 2003 | Rentschler Field | East Hartford | 40,000 |
| January 14, 2023 | Martire Family Arena | Fairfield | 5,300 |
| 1995 | Xfinity Theatre | Hartford | 24,100 |
| January 9, 1975 | PeoplesBank Arena | Hartford | 16,294 |
| 1930 | Mortensen Hall | Hartford | 2,800 |
| November 19, 1937 | Webster Theater | Hartford | 1,200 |
| 1990 | Gampel Pavilion | Storrs | 10,842 |
| 1931; restored 2002 | Warner Theatre | Torrington | 1,780 |
| 1954 | The Dome at Oakdale | Wallingford | 1,649 |
| 1996 | Toyota Oakdale Theatre | Wallingford | 4,800 |
| unknown | Welte Hall | New Britain | 1,900 |
| 1926 | Garde Arts Center | New London | 1,420 |
| unknown | Norwalk City Hall Auditorium | Norwalk | 1,063 |
| October 2001 | Mohegan Sun Arena | Uncasville | 10,000 |
| May 17, 2008 | Premier Theater | Mashantucket | 4,000 |
| 2003 | Grand Cedar Showroom | Mashantucket | 1,370 |
| November 11, 1914 | Yale Bowl | New Haven | 61,446 |
| 2021 | Westville Music Bowl | New Haven | 5,000 |
| 1914 | Shubert Theatre | New Haven | 1,600 |
| 1901 | Woolsey Hall | New Haven | 2,650 |
| May 2015 | College Street Music Hall | New Haven | 2,000 |
| unknown | Lyman Center for the Performing Arts | New Haven | 1,565 |
| January 17, 1922 | Palace Theatre | Waterbury | 2,570 |

=== Delaware ===
| Opened | Venue | City | Capacity |
|---|---|---|---|
| 1969 | Dover International Speedway | Dover | 95,000 |
| 1995 | Rollins Center | Dover | 1,770 |
| 1946 | M&T Bank Grandstand | Harrington | 8,285 |
| 1997 | Quillen Arena | Harrington | 7,116 |
| 1966;renovated 2022 | Madden Auditorium | Seaford | 1,200 |
| 2021 | Freeman Arts Pavilion | Selbyville | 4,000 |
| 1992 | Bob Carpenter Center | Newark | 5,100 |
| 1952 | Delaware Stadium | Newark | 31,120 |
| 1870 | Copeland Hall | Wilmington | 1,140 |
| 1913 | Playhouse at Rodney Square | Wilmington | 1,230 |

=== Florida ===
| Opened | Venue | City | Capacity |
|---|---|---|---|
| 2016 | Apopka Amphitheatre | Apopka | 11,300 |
| 1984; renovated 2010 | Wildstein Center for the Performing Arts | Avon Park | 1,460 |
| 1985 (Renovated 2012 and 2024) | Bradenton Area Convention Center | Bradenton | 4,000 |
| 2003 | Watsco Center | Coral Gables | 8,000 |
| 1989 | Coral Springs Center for the Arts | Coral Springs | 1,471 |
| October 5, 1985 | Ocean Center | Daytona Beach | 9,312 |
| 1959 | Daytona International Speedway | Daytona Beach | 123,500 |
| October 6, 1949 | Peabody Auditorium | Daytona Beach | 2,521 |
| 1936 | Daytona Beach Bandshell | Daytona Beach | 4,500 |
| 2003 | Bethune-Cookman Performing Arts Center | Daytona Beach | 2,500 |
| 2015 | jetBlue Park | Fort Myers | 16,000 |
| Fall 2002 | Alico Arena | Fort Myers | 4,633 |
| 1980 | Barbara B. Mann Performing Arts Hall | Fort Myers | 1,874 |
| May 2022 | Caloosa Sound Amphitheater | Fort Myers | 3,000 |
| 2000 | Hayes Hall | Naples | 1,477 |
| 1978 | Lee County Civic Center | North Fort Myers | 7,800 |
| 2016 | Suncoast Credit Union Arena | North Fort Myers | 3,500 |
| 1923 | Sunrise Theater | Fort Pierce | 1,200 |
| 2008 | Fenn Center | Fort Pierce | 3,000 |
| unknown | Adams Arena | Fort Pierce | 7,285 |
| December 30, 1980 | Exactech Arena | Gainesville | 10,500 (Center stage); 7,000 (End stage) |
| 1992 | Philips Center | Gainesville | 1,700 |
| 2020s | Alachua County Sports and Event Center | Gainesville | 5,000 |
| 2022 | Vivid Music Hall | Gainesville | 1,050 |
| c. 1970 (Renovated 2016) | Bo Diddley Plaza | Gainesville | 4,500 |
| 1970 | Gainesville Raceway | Gainesville | 32,000 |
| July 16, 2017 | Legacy Park Multipurpose Center | Alachua | 3,900 |
| N/A | Alachua County Agriculture and Equestrian Center | Newberry | 4,000 |
| 1945 | Southeastern Livestock Pavilion | Ocala | 8,040 |
| unknown | Van Ness Arena | Inverness | 5,400 |
| November 28, 2003 | VyStar Veterans Memorial Arena | Jacksonville | 15,000 |
| 1927; reopened 1983 | Florida Theatre | Jacksonville | 1,900 |
| May 2017 | Daily's Place | Jacksonville | 5,500 |
| August 18, 1995 | EverBank Stadium | Jacksonville | 67,814 |
| September 16, 1962 | Jacksonville Center for the Performing Arts | Jacksonville | 2,979 (Moran Theater); 1,724 (Jacoby Symphony Hall); 609(Terry Theater) |
| 2004 | Jacksonville Equestrian Center | Jacksonville | 8,042 |
| 1984 | Metropolitan Park | Jacksonville | 10,000 |
| January 1993 | UNF Arena | Jacksonville | 6,750 |
| 2000s | Lazzara Performance Hall | Jacksonville | 1,300 |
| April 2026 | Duval Hall | Jacksonville | 2,900 |
| November 2026 | JAX Amphitheater | Jacksonville | 10,000 |
| June 2, 1965; rebuilt 2007 | St. Augustine Amphitheatre | St. Augustine | 5,000 |
| 2021 | Coffee Butler Amphitheatre | Key West | 4,000 |
| 1997 | House of Blues | Lake Buena Vista | 2,100 |
| 1921 | The Beacham | Orlando | 1,250 |
| 1926 | Bob Carr Theater | Orlando | 2,401 |
| February 26, 1983 | Chapin Theater | Orlando | 2,643 |
| November 6, 2014 | Dr. Phillips Center for the Performing Arts | Orlando | 2,731 (Walt Disney Theater); 1,700 (Steinmetz Hall) |
| February 4, 1999 | Hard Rock Live Universal | Orlando | 3,000 |
| February 21, 2009 | Universal Music Plaza Stage | Orlando | 8,000 |
| 2016 | Orlando Amphitheatre | Orlando | 10,000 |
| September 8, 2007 | Addition Financial Arena | Orlando | 10,000 |
| October 1, 2010 | Kia Center | Orlando | 20,000 |
| September 15, 2007 | Acrisure Bounce House | Orlando | 44,206 |
| 1936 | Camping World Stadium | Orlando | 60,219 |
| March 5, 2017 | Inter.co Stadium | Orlando | 35,500 |
| 2017 | The Warehouse | Orlando | 3,500 |
| 2024 | Orlando Pavilion | Orlando | 5,000 |
| 2016 | Clermont Performing Arts Center | Clermont | 1,096 |
| 2003 | Silver Spurs Arena | Kissimmee | 11,400 (Full house); 6,570 (Half-house); 3,670 (Theater) |
| February 2, 2002 | Osceola Ballroom | Kissimmee | 5,558 |
| 2010s | Osceola Performing Arts Center | Kissimmee | 1,979 |
| unknown | Clemente Center | Melbourne | 3,500 |
| 1988 | Maxwell C. King Center | Melbourne | 2,016 |
| February 1994 | Space Coast Stadium | Viera | 12,000+ (8,100 permanent seats) |
| January 11, 1991 | Mizner Park Amphitheater | Boca Raton | 5,000 (GA); 3,500(Reserved) |
| 2009 | Sunset Cove Amphitheater | Boca Raton | 6,000 |
| 1982 | Kaye Auditorium | Boca Raton | 2,400 |
| 2010s | Century Village Boca Raton Theatre | Boca Raton | 1,147 |
| November 16, 1974 | RP Funding Center | Lakeland | 8,178 (Jenkins Arena); 2,236 (Youkey Theater) |
| 1928 | Polk Theatre | Lakeland | 1,400 |
| 1964 | Branscomb Memorial Auditorium | Lakeland | 1,782 |
| March 2018 | Hard Rock Live | Hollywood | 7,000 |
| November 7, 2007 | Broward County Stadium | Lauderhill | 30,000 |
| January 20, 2016 | Lauderhill Performing Arts Center | Lauderhill | 1,106 |
| unknown | Bassant Park | Panama City Beach | 7,500 |
| January 21, 1985 | Pensacola Bay Center | Pensacola | 12,500 |
| 1925 | Saenger Theatre | Pensacola | 1,641 |
| May 2012 | Hunter Amphitheater | Pensacola | 5,000 |
| 2002 | Escambia County Equestrian Center | Pensacola | 7,625 |
| 1952 (rebuilt in 2007) | Pensacola High School Auditorium | Pensacola | 2,000 |
| 2010s | Mattie Kelly Fine Arts Center | Niceville | 1,650 |
| 2010s | North Port Performing Arts Center | North Port | 1,050 |
| 2015 | Charlotte Harbor Event and Conference Center | Punta Gorda | 1,800 |
| November 2, 1998 | Hertz Arena | Estero | 8,284 |
| 1983 | Ruth Eckerd Hall | Clearwater | 2,180 |
| 2020s | BayCare Sound | Clearwater | 9,000 |
| 1984 | Jannus Live | St. Petersburg | 2,000 |
| May 1965 | Mahaffey Theater | St. Petersburg | 2,031 |
| March 3, 1990 | Tropicana Field | St. Petersburg | 42,735 |
| March 31, 1959 | Stanleyville Theatre | Tampa | 1,200 |
| July 25, 2004 | MidFlorida Credit Union Amphitheatre | Tampa | 17,800 |
| October 20, 1996 | Benchmark International Arena | Tampa | 20,500 |
| September 20, 1998 | Raymond James Stadium | Tampa | 69,218 |
| 1987 | Straz Performing Arts Center | Tampa | 2,610 (Morsani Hall); 1,042 (Ferguson Theater) |
| November 29, 1980 | Yuengling Center | Tampa | 11,066 (Center stage); 8,542 (End stage); 5,154 (Half-house) |
| April 2012 | Yuengling Theatre | Tampa | 3,228 |
| 2004 | Seminole Hard Rock | Tampa | 1,500 |
| October 15, 1926 | Tampa Theatre | Tampa | 1,252 |
| 1977 | Expo Hall | Tampa | 11,926 |
| 1977 | Florida State Fair Entertainment Hall | Tampa | 5,000 |
| 1967 | Robarts Arena | Sarasota | 5,000 |
| April 10, 1926 (Renovated 1984, 1990, 1993 and 2008) | Sarasota Opera House | Sarasota | 1,119 |
| January 5, 1970 | Van Wezel Performing Arts Hall | Sarasota | 1,741 |
| unknown | Circus Arts Conservatory | Sarasota | 1,645 (Ulla Searing Big Top); 1,500 (Sailor Circus Arena) |
| 1989 | Ed Smith Stadium | Sarasota | 12,500 |
| 2020s | Mosaic Arena | Palmetto | 5,250 |
| 2014 | Venice Performing Arts Center | Venice | 1,090 |
| unknown | Alan Jay Arena | Sebring | 3,200 |
| 2009 | Al Lawson Center | Tallahassee | 9,639 |
| 1982 | Donald L. Tucker Civic Center | Tallahassee | 11,766 |
| 1911; rebuilt 1954 | Diamond Concert Hall | Tallahassee | 1,172 |
| 2000s | Lee Hall Auditorium | Tallahassee | 1,190 |
| 2021 | Adderley Amphitheatre | Tallahassee | 3,420 |
| April 26, 1996 | ITHINK Financial Amphitheatre | West Palm Beach | 20,000 |
| 2010s | Century Village West Palm Beach Theater | West Palm Beach | 1,221 |
| December 31, 1999 | Kaseya Center | Miami | 20,000 (Arena); 5,800 (Waterfront Theater) |
| 1957 | The Fillmore | Miami | 3,230 |
| February 18, 1926 | Olympia Theater | Miami | 1,567 |
| October 5, 2006 | Adrienne Arsht Center for the Performing Arts | Miami | 2,300 (Ziff Opera House); 2,100 (Knight Concert Hall) |
| 1985 | FPL Solar Amphitheatre | Miami | 10,000 |
| March 5, 2012 | LoanDepot Park | Miami | 37,000 |
| 1995 | Pitbull Stadium | Miami | 20,000 |
| 1982 | James L. Knight Center Theater | Miami | 4,569 |
| 1986 | Ocean Bank Convocation Center | Miami | 5,960 |
| April 4, 2026 | Nu Stadium | Miami | 26,700 |
| August 16, 1987 | Hard Rock Stadium | Miami Gardens | 64,767 |
| 2010s | Charles F. Dodge City Center | Pembroke Pines | 3,704 |
| 2010s | Century Village Pembroke Pines Theater | Pembroke Pines | 1,030 |
| October 3, 1998 | Amerant Bank Arena | Sunrise | 20,737 |
| 2004 | Revolution Live | Fort Lauderdale | 1,300 |
| February 26, 1991 | Broward Center for the Performing Arts | Fort Lauderdale | 2,658 |
| February 6, 1967 | Parker Playhouse | Fort Lauderdale | 1,147 |
| 1920s; roof added 1985 | Bergeron Rodeo Grounds Arena | Davie | 5,000 |
| 2005 | Sammons Auditorium | Vero Beach | 1,018 |
| September 19, 1992 | Raymond F. Kravis Center for the Performing Arts | West Palm Beach | 2,195 (Dreyfoos Hall); 305 (Rinker Playhouse); 291 (Persson Hall) |

=== Georgia ===
| Opened | Venue | City | Capacity |
|---|---|---|---|
| February 1983 | Albany Civic Center | Albany | 10,240 |
| 1980s | Veterans Park Amphitheatre | Albany | 2,500 |
| 1995; expanded 2014 | Classic Center Arena | Athens | 5,000 |
| 1996 | Classic Center Theater | Athens | 2,000 |
| October 2024 | Akins Ford Arena | Athens | 8,500 (Center stage); 7,000 (End stage) |
| October 12, 1929 | Sanford Stadium | Athens | 92,746 |
| November 1963 | Stegeman Coliseum | Athens | 10,523 |
| September 18, 1999 | State Farm Arena | Atlanta | 21,000 |
| July 1996 | Center Parc Stadium | Atlanta | 33,500 |
| July 1989 | Lakewood Amphitheatre | Atlanta | 18,920 |
| September 15, 2007 | Cobb Energy Performing Arts Centre | Atlanta | 2,750 (John A. Williams Theater) |
| June 20, 1944 | Synovus Bank Amphitheater | Atlanta | 6,900 |
| 1929 | Fabulous Fox Theatre | Atlanta | 4,665 |
| 1911 | The Tabernacle | Atlanta | 2,600 |
| 1930s | Buckhead Theatre | Atlanta | 1,800 |
| 1966 | Center Stage | Atlanta | 1,050 |
| 1988 | The Masquerade | Atlanta | 1,000 |
| September 27, 1913 | Bobby Dodd Stadium | Atlanta | 55,000 |
| August 26, 2017 | Mercedes-Benz Stadium | Atlanta | 71,000 |
| 1977 | Marcus Auditorium | Atlanta | 1,725 |
| 1956; rebuilt November 2012 | McCamish Pavilion | Atlanta | 9,550 |
| September 2022 | Georgia State Convocation Center | Atlanta | 7,500 |
| April 9, 1996 | Forbes Arena | Atlanta | 6,000 |
| September 2009 | UWG Coliseum | Carrollton | 6,469 |
| May 10, 2008 | Ameris Bank Amphitheatre | Alpharetta | 12,000 |
| 1940 | Miller Theatre | Augusta | 1,300 |
| March 31, 1940 | Bell Auditorium | Augusta | 2,690 |
| unknown | Buford Arena | Buford | 5,000 |
| August 9, 1994 | Columbus Civic Center | Columbus | 10,000 (Full arena); 6,000 (Half-house); 3,500 (Theater) |
| April 2002 | Heard Theater | Columbus | 2,000 |
| 1853 | South Exhibit Hall | Columbus | 2,300 |
| unknown | Lumpkin Center | Columbus | 5,140 |
| April 14, 2017 | Truist Park | Cumberland | 41,149 |
| April 16, 2017 | Coca-Cola Roxy | Cumberland | 2,650 (General admission); 1,500 (Reserved) |
| 1991 | Dalton Convention Center | Dalton | 4,070 |
| 2007 | Northwest Georgia Amphitheatre | Ringgold | 3,500 |
| 2024 | Legacy Arena | Douglasville | 7,000 |
| February 16, 2003 | Gas South Arena | Duluth | 13,000 (Full arena); 3,500 (Theater) |
| c. 2022 | Columbia County Performing Arts Center | Evans | 2,064 |
| May 1990 | Stroud Hall | Jonesboro | 1,800 |
| 2023 | Trilith Live | Lawrenceville | 2,200 (Reserved); 3,000 (General Admission) |
| 1968; renovated 1996 and 2003 | Macon Coliseum | Macon | 9,000 |
| Circa 1925 | Macon City Auditorium | Macon | 2,688 |
| 2005 | Hawkins Arena | Macon | 4,150 |
| 2013 | Five Star Stadium | Macon | 15,500 |
| 2024 | Atrium Health Amphitheatre | Macon | 12,000 |
| 1905 | Piedmont Grand Opera House | Macon | 1,030 |
| February 25, 2026 | Clayton County Arena | Morrow | 8,000 |
| 1989 | Reaves Arena | Perry | 8,250 |
| 2005 | Forum River Center | Rome | 4,000 |
| 1916 | Rome City Auditorium | Rome | 1,106 |
| 1974 | Johnny Mercer Theatre | Savannah | 2,566 |
| 2000 | Tiger Arena | Savannah | 6,000 |
| February 2022 | Enmarket Arena | Savannah | 9,500 |
| 1946 | Trustees Theatre | Savannah | 1,100 |
| August 1, 2026 | VyStar Pavilion | Port Wentworth | 4,500 |
| September 1984 | Paulson Stadium | Statesboro | 34,000 |
| December 3, 2024 | Hill Convocation Center | Statesboro | 5,900 |
| 1982 | The Complex | Valdosta | 6,300 |
| 2022 | All-Star Amphitheater | Valdosta | 2,250 |
| 1971 | Walker Civic Center | Warner Robins | 1,400 |
| 2018 | Northside Hospital-Cherokee Amphitheater | Woodstock | 5,000 |

=== Hawaii ===
| Opened | Venue | City | Capacity |
|---|---|---|---|
| 1957 | Afook-Chinen Civic Auditorium | Hilo | 3,568 |
| 1970s | Edith Kanaka'ole Stadium | Hilo | 5,490 |
| September 12, 1964 | Neal S. Blaisdell Center | Honolulu | 8,800 (Arena); 2,158 (Concert Hall) |
| 1956 | Waikiki Shell | Honolulu | 8,400 |
| October 21, 1994 | Stan Sheriff Center | Honolulu | 11,200 |
| 1998 | Hawaii Convention Center | Honolulu | 12,309 |
| September 6, 1922 | Hawaii Theatre | Honolulu | 1,350 |
| 2011 | Republik | Honolulu | 1,200 |
| 1994 | Maui Arts and Cultural Center | Kahului | 5,500 (Alexander and Baldwin Amphitheatre); 4,000 (Community Events Lawn); 1,500 (Yokouchi Pavilion); 1,297 (Castle Theatre) |
| 1970 | Lahaina Civic Center | Lahaina | 2,400 (Arena); 2,200 (Amphitheater) |
| 1964 | Kauai War Memorial Convention Hall | Lihue | 1,100 |
| 1954 | War Memorial Gymnasium | Wailuku | 3,228 |
| 1969 | War Memorial Stadium | Wailuku | 20,000 |
| unknown | Cannon Activities Center | Laie | 5,450 |

=== Idaho ===
| Opened | Venue | City | Capacity |
|---|---|---|---|
| September 24, 1997 | Idaho Central Arena | Boise | 6,800 |
| May 16, 1982 | ExtraMile Arena | Boise | 13,390 (Full arena); 2,511 (Theater) |
| April 1984 | Morrison Center | Boise | 2,000 |
| September 1970 | Albertsons Stadium | Boise | 37,500 |
| 1965 | Capital Auditorium | Boise | 1,200 |
| July 1997 | Ford Idaho Center | Nampa | 12,279 (Arena); 6,000 (Half-house); 2,500 (Theater); 10,500 (Amphitheater) |
| unknown | Swayne Auditorium | Nampa | 1,500 |
| unknown | Eldon Evans Expo Center | Twin Falls | 3,500 |
| August 22, 2012 | Revolution Concert House | Garden City | 2,300 |
| July 2017 | Snake River Landing Waterfront | Idaho Falls | 3,520 |
| 1952 | Civic Center for the Performing Arts | Idaho Falls | 1,892 |
| November 28, 2022 | Hero Arena | Idaho Falls | 6,000 |
| unknown | Meridian Auditorium | Meridian | 1,200 |
| unknown | Schuler Center for the Performing Arts | Coeur D'Alene | 1,159 |
| 1975 | Kibbie-ASUI Activities Center | Moscow | 24,000 |
| Fall 2021 | ICCU Arena | Moscow | 5,150 |
| 1970 | ICCU Dome | Pocatello | 18,000 |
| 2015 | Portneuf Amphitheatre | Pocatello | 9,000 |
| January 2004 | Jensen Concert Hall | Pocatello | 1,200 |
| 2010 | BYU Idaho Center | Rexburg | 15,000 |
| 1969 | Hart Auditorium | Rexburg | 3,741 |

=== Illinois ===
| Opened | Venue | City | Capacity |
|---|---|---|---|
| April 1, 2006 | Grossinger Motors Arena | Bloomington | 7,000 |
| 1921 | Bloomington Center for the Performing Arts | Bloomington | 1,200 |
| June 11, 2006 | SeatGeek Stadium | Bridgeview | 28,000 |
| March 2, 1963 | State Farm Center | Champaign | 15,500 |
| 1969 | Foellinger Great Hall | Champaign | 2,058 |
| November 3, 1923 | Gies Memorial Stadium | Champaign | 60,670 |
| 2016 | State Farm Theatre | Champaign | 3,600 |
| November 4, 1907 | Foellinger Auditorium | Champaign | 1,361 |
| 1921 | Virginia Theatre | Champaign | 1,463 |
| August 15, 1904 | Hunter Pavilion | Highland Park | 3,350 |
| 1926 | Aragon Ballroom | Chicago | 5,000 |
| 1960 | Arie Crown Theater | Chicago | 4,250 |
| 1889 | Auditorium Theatre | Chicago | 3,875 |
| 1921 | Chicago Theatre | Chicago | 3,600 |
| 2020 | Radius Chicago | Chicago | 3,800 |
| November 4, 1929 | Ardis Krainik Theatre | Chicago | 3,563 |
| 1996 | House of Blues | Chicago | 1,300 |
| October 14, 2017 | Wintrust Arena | Chicago | 10,387 |
| July 16, 2004 | Jay Pritzker Pavilion | Chicago | 11,000 |
| June 24, 2005 | Huntington Bank Pavilion | Chicago | 30,000 |
| 2003 | Harris Theater | Chicago | 1,525 |
| late 1917 | Riviera Theatre | Chicago | 2,500 |
| October 9, 1924 | Soldier Field | Chicago | 61,500 |
| May 31, 1982 | Credit Union 1 Arena | Chicago | 9,500 |
| August 18, 1994 | United Center | Chicago | 23,500 |
| April 18, 1991 | Rate Field | Chicago | 40,615 |
| 1912 | The Vic Theatre | Chicago | 1,400 |
| April 23, 1914 | Wrigley Field | Chicago | 41,160 |
| 1927 | Patio Theatre | Chicago | 1,496 |
| 2005 | House of Hope | Chicago | 10,000 |
| 2021 | Greenwood Oasis | Chicago | 3,728 |
| 1904 | Symphony Hall | Chicago | 2,500 |
| 1996; expanded 2011 | Joseph J. Gentile Arena | Chicago | 5,000 |
| 2007 | Jones Convocation Center | Chicago | 7,000 |
| 1916 | Aon Grand Ballroom | Chicago | 2,100 |
| 1928 | Chodl Auditorium | Cicero | 2,288 |
| 1969 | Hemmens Cultural Center | Elgin | 1,200 |
| 1953; renovated 1983 and 2018 | Welsh–Ryan Arena | Evanston | 7,309 |
| October 2006 | Now Arena | Hoffman Estates | 11,218 (Full arena); 7,410(3/4 house); 4,628(Theatre) |
| 1926 | Pfeiffer Hall | Naperville | 1,057 |
| 1926 | Trinity Auditorium | River Forest | 1,200 |
| 1969 | Edman Memorial Chapel | Wheaton | 2,400 |
| September 20, 1980 | David S. Palmer Arena | Danville | 4,750 (Festival); 3,700(Reserved) |
| August 16, 2002 | NIU Convocation Center | Dekalb | 10,000 (Full arena); 2,500 (Theatre) |
| 1929 | Egyptian Theatre | Dekalb | 1,390 |
| 1962 | Duke Ellington Ballroom | Dekalb | 1,552 (Reserved); 2,128 (General Admission) |
| May 17, 1926 | Rialto Square Theatre | Joliet | 1,966 |
| May 1, 2004 | Marion Cultural and Civic Center | Marion | 1,094 |
| May 28, 1993 | Vibrant Arena at The MARK | Moline | 12,000 |
| 1900s (remodeled 2010s) | The Rust Belt | Moline | 4,000 |
| 1960 | Centennial Hall | Rock Island | 1,500 |
| 1936 | Rocky Stadium at Almquist Field | Rock Island | 15,000 |
| 1936 | Rock Island Auditorium | Rock Island | 1,500 |
| 1959 | Rock Island Fieldhouse | Rock Island | 6,925 |
| February 1982 | Peoria Civic Center | Peoria | 12,000 (Carver Arena); 2,173 (Theater) |
| 1989 | CEFCU Arena | Normal | 10,500 |
| 1973 | Braden Auditorium | Normal | 3,453 |
| 1995 | Oakley-Lindsay Center | Quincy | 3,500 |
| June 18, 1924 | Washington Theatre | Quincy | 1,500 |
| October 1927 | Coronado Performing Arts Center | Rockford | 2,310 |
| January 31, 1981 | BMO Center | Rockford | 8,000 (General Admission); 7,000 (Reserved); 5,100 (Half-house GA); 4,000 (Half-house) |
| 1950 | Sinnissippi Music Shell | Rockford | 3,700 |
| August 28, 2024 | Hard Rock Live Rockford | Rockford | 2,000 |
| May 11, 1980 | Allstate Arena | Rosemont | 18,500 |
| 1995 | Rosemont Theatre | Rosemont | 4,400 |
| 1978 | Bank of Springfield Center | Springfield | 8,758 |
| 1981 | Sangamon Auditorium | Springfield | 2,005 |
| 1927 | Illinois State Fair Grandstand | Springfield | 13,000 |
| 2000s | Illinois State Fair Multipurpose Arena | Springfield | 10,000 |
| 1901 | Illinois State Fair Coliseum | Springfield | 2,778 |
| 1974 | Decatur Civic Center | Decatur | 3,200 |
| May 29, 2019 | Devon Lakeside Amphitheatre | Decatur | 3,000 |
| 1970 | Kirkland Fine Arts Center | Decatur | 1,903 |
| 1964 | Banterra Center | Carbondale | 9,244 |
| 1918 | Shryrock Auditorium | Carbondale | 1,200 |
| August 2010 | Saluki Stadium | Carbondale | 20,000+ (15,000 permanent seats) |
| 1990 | Credit Union 1 Amphitheatre | Tinley Park | 28,000 |
| 1927 | Genesee Theatre | Waukegan | 2,427 |

=== Indiana ===
| Opened | Venue | City | Capacity |
|---|---|---|---|
| 1941 | IU Auditorium | Bloomington | 3,200 |
| 1960 | Lucas Oil Indianapolis Raceway Park | Brownsburg | 45,000 |
| October 20, 2009 | Ford Center | Evansville | 10,000 |
| 1921 | Victory Theatre | Evansville | 1,900 |
| 1967 | Aiken Theater | Evansville | 2,500 |
| 2019 | Liberty Arena | Evansville | 5,750 |
| September 28, 1952 | Allen County War Memorial Coliseum | Fort Wayne | 12,500 (full house); 4,000 (front of house) |
| 1989 | Allen County War Memorial Expo Center | Fort Wayne | 7,000 (full house); 3,000 (half-house) |
| May 14, 1928 | Embassy Theatre | Fort Wayne | 2,471 |
| 1949 | Foellinger Theater | Fort Wayne | 2,751 |
| 1925 | Goldstine Performing Arts Center | Fort Wayne | 2,011 |
| 2012 | Auer Performance Hall | Fort Wayne | 1,500 |
| 1985 | Grand Wayne Convention Hall | Fort Wayne | 4,500 |
| 2021 | Sweetwater Performance Pavilion | Fort Wayne | 3,500 |
| October 2021 | Hard Rock Live Northern Indiana | Gary | 2,207 (General Admission); 1,894 (Reserved) |
| October 11, 2024 | Gas City Performing Arts Center | Gas City | 1,830 |
| 1938 | Hammond Civic Center | Hammond | 5,460 |
| July 2018 | The Venue at Horseshoe Hammond | Hammond | 3,300 (General Admission); 2,576 (Reserved) |
| August 12, 1999 | Pavilion at Wolf Lake Memorial Park | Hammond | 15,000 |
| March 7, 1928 | Hinkle Fieldhouse | Indianapolis | 9,100 |
| November 6, 1999 | Gainbridge Fieldhouse | Indianapolis | 20,000 |
| August 1939 | Corteva Coliseum | Indianapolis | 6,800 |
| 1909 | Old National Centre | Indianapolis | 2,675 (Murat Theatre); 1,800 (Egyptian Room); 600 (Corinthian Hall) |
| August 16, 2008 | Lucas Oil Stadium | Indianapolis | 63,000 |
| May 2021 | Everwise Amphitheater at White River State Park | Indianapolis | 6,000 |
| October 1963 | Clowes Memorial Hall | Indianapolis | 2,142 |
| unknown | Celebration Park | Indianapolis | 5,000 |
| 1916; reopened October 2, 1984 | Hilbert Circle Theatre | Indianapolis | 1,660 |
| January 2011 | The Palladium at the Center for Performing Arts | Carmel | 1,600 |
| November 22, 2024 | Fishers Event Center | Fishers | 7,500 |
| 2025 | Nickel Plate District Amphitheater | Fishers | 6,000 |
| June 2014 | Grand Park Events Center | Westfield | 8,592 |
| April 19, 1921 | Long Center for the Performing Arts | Lafayette | 1,100 |
| May 24, 1970 | Crawley Center | Lafayette | 8,150 |
| 2002 | Rohrman Performing Arts Center | Lafayette | 1,273 |
| 1930 | La Porte Civic Auditorium | La Porte | 3,000 |
| 2015 | Lawrenceburg Event Center | Lawrenceburg | 3,000 |
| 1970 | Bill Green Arena | Marion | 7,500 |
| January 2010 | IWU Chapel Auditorium | Marion | 3,600 |
| 1973 | Walton Performing Arts Center | Marion | 1,500 |
| unknown | Rediger Memorial Chapel and Auditorium | Upland | 1,641 |
| unknown | Stardust Event Center | Michigan City | 1,200 |
| 1971 | The Wolves Den | Michigan City | 7,172 |
| 1992 | Worthen Arena | Muncie | 11,500 |
| March 14, 1964 | Emens Auditorium | Muncie | 3,309 |
| September 17, 1967 | Schuemann Stadium | Muncie | 32,000 (22,500 permanent seats) |
| August 29, 1929 | Paramount Theatre | Anderson | 1,445 |
| 1983 | Reardon Auditorium | Anderson | 2,200 |
| 1961; renovated 2021 | The Wigwam | Anderson | 9,500 |
| unknown | Caesars Amphitheatre | New Albany | 6,000 |
| 1989 | Ruoff Music Center | Noblesville | 24,790 |
| August 2025 | Riverview Health Arena at Innovation Mile | Noblesville | 4,277 |
| October 4, 1930 | Notre Dame Stadium | Notre Dame | 77,622 |
| 1966 | Joyce Center | Notre Dame | 10,000 |
| 1922 | Morris Performing Arts Center | South Bend | 2,564 |
| 1982 | Fischgrund Performing Arts Center | South Bend | 4,500 |
| 1979 | O'Laughlin Auditorium | South Bend | 1,300 |
| November 24, 1924 | Lerner Theatre | Elkhart | 1,700 |
| 1954 | North Side Gymnasium | Elkhart | 7,373 |
| 1984 | Tiernan Center | Richmond | 5,700 |
| December 14, 1973 | Hulman Center | Terre Haute | 10,200 |
| 1940 | Tilson Auditorium | Terre Haute | 1,425 |
| 2021 | The Mill | Terre Haute | 12,000 |
| 1927 | Zorah Shrine Temple | Terre Haute | 2,000 |
| May 3, 1940 | Elliott Hall of Music | West Lafayette | 6,005 |
| May 1, 1965 | Slayter Center of Performing Arts | West Lafayette | 20,000 |

=== Iowa ===
| Opened | Venue | City | Capacity |
|---|---|---|---|
| January 25, 1979 | Alliant Energy PowerHouse | Cedar Rapids | 8,600 |
| 2014 | McGrath Amphitheatre | Cedar Rapids | 6,000 |
| September 1, 1928 | Paramount Theatre | Cedar Rapids | 1,693 |
| 1951 | Sinclair Auditorium | Cedar Rapids | 1,100 |
| July 3, 1988 | Westfair Amphitheater | Council Bluffs | 12,000 |
| October 2002 | Mid-America Center | Council Bluffs | 9,000 |
| 2022 | Lewis Central Performing Arts Center | Council Bluffs | 1,100 |
| July 12, 2005 | Casey's Center | Des Moines | 16,110 |
| 1909 | Iowa State Fairgrounds Grandstand | Des Moines | 16,000 |
| January 1, 2019 | Horizon Events Center | Des Moines | 3,000 |
| June 10, 1979 | Des Moines Civic Center | Des Moines | 2,744 |
| 1923 | Hoyt Sherman Place | Des Moines | 1,252 |
| 2019 | Lauridsen Amphitheater | Des Moines | 25,000 |
| 2010 | Jacobson Center | Des Moines | 6,729 |
| 1951; auditorium built 1984; remodeled 2022 | Tower Performance Center | Des Moines | 5,000 (General Admission); 4,300 (Reserved) (2,300 permanent balcony seats) |
| 1993 | Knapp Center | Des Moines | 7,450 |
| February 2007 | Bishop Ballroom at Meadows Event Center | Altoona | 1,440 |
| January 2009 | Urbandale Performing Arts Center | Urbandale | 1,100 |
| 2024 | Vibrant Music Hall | Waukee | 2,500 |
| September 2017 | Staplin Performing Arts Center | West Des Moines | 1,156 |
| 1931 | Adler Theatre | Davenport | 2,400 |
| 1920 | Capitol Theatre | Davenport | 1,500 |
| April 1979 | Five Flags Center | Dubuque | 4,700 (Reserved); 5,200 (Festival); 3,500 (Half-house) |
| unknown | Alliant Energy Amphitheater | Dubuque | 4,200 |
| January 3, 1983 | Carver–Hawkeye Arena | Iowa City | 15,500 |
| 1972 | Hancher Auditorium | Iowa City | 1,800 |
| October 5, 1929 | Kinnick Stadium | Iowa City | 69,250 |
| September 2020 | Xtream Arena | Coralville | 6,000 |
| December 2, 1971 | Hilton Coliseum | Ames | 15,000 |
| 1969 | Iowa State Center | Ames | 2,603 |
| December 17, 2003 | Tyson Events Center | Sioux City | 10,000 (Arena); 5,000 (Half-house); 1,500 (Theater) |
| 2015 | Battery Park | Sioux City | 5,500 |
| 1927 | Orpheum Theatre | Sioux City | 2,549 |
| unknown | Eppley Auditorium | Sioux City | 1,200 |
| 1910 | Hippodrome | Waterloo | 7,000 |
| February 7, 1976 | UNI-Dome | Cedar Falls | 24,196 (End stage); 19,436 (Center stage); 10,000 (Side stage) |
| 2006 | McLeod Center | Cedar Falls | 7,018 |
| April 6, 2000 | Gallagher Great Hall | Cedar Falls | 1,680 |

=== Kansas ===
| Opened | Venue | City | Capacity |
|---|---|---|---|
| 1970 | McCain Auditorium | Manhattan | 1,751 |
| October 2025 | Bilbrey Family Events Center | Manhattan | 6,250 |
| January 2, 2010 | Intrust Bank Arena | Wichita | 15,750 |
| March 2009 | Heartland Credit Union Arena | Wichita | 6,500 |
| 1955 (reopened 2003) | Charles Koch Arena | Wichita | 11,475 |
| 1969 | Century II Performing Arts & Convention Center | Wichita | 8,622 (Full hall); 5,022 (Bell Convention Hall); 3,600 (Exhibition Hall); 2,195 (Performing Arts Center) |
| September 4, 1922 | Orpheum Theatre | Wichita | 1,286 |
| unknown | Lowe Auditorium | Wichita | 1,750 |
| 1960 | Cotillion Ballroom | Wichita | 2,000 |
| September 1959 | South Auditorium | Wichita | 1,288 |
| 1923 | East Auditorium | Wichita | 1,585 |
| 1953 | West Auditorium | Wichita | 1,443 |
| September 2014 | Southeast Auditorium | Wichita | 1,295 |
| 1929 | North Auditorium | Wichita | 1,158 |
| April 28, 2018 | Capital Federal Amphitheater | Andover | 10,000 |
| 1952 | Hutchinson Sports Arena | Hutchinson | 6,500 |
| 1911 | Hutchinson Memorial Hall | Hutchinson | 2,331 |
| June 2013 | Kansas Star Arena | Mulvane | 6,000 |
| 1983 | Azura Amphitheater | Bonner Springs | 18,000 |
| 1925 | Memorial Hall | Kansas City | 3,500 |
| June 2, 1979 | Tony's Pizza Events Center | Salina | 7,000 (Full house); 4,178 (Half-house); 3,234 (1/4 House) |
| May 19, 1931 (Restored 2003) | Stiefel Theatre | Salina | 1,265 |
| 1940 | Topeka Performing Arts Center | Topeka | 2,417 |
| 1987 | Landon Arena | Topeka | 10,000 (General Admission); 9,650 (Reserved) |
| 1993 | Lied Center of Kansas | Lawrence | 1,983 |

=== Kentucky ===
| Opened | Venue | City | Capacity |
|---|---|---|---|
| 1931 | Paramount Arts Center | Ashland | 1,417 |
| December 1963 | E. A. Diddle Arena | Bowling Green | 8,483 |
| 2002 | Scott Concert Hall | Bowling Green | 1,800 |
| September 21, 1968 | Houchens Industries-L.T. Smith Stadium | Bowling Green | 31,250 |
| May 1974 | Wilson Fine Arts Center Amphitheater | Bowling Green | 2,900 |
| 1911 | Van Meter Hall | Bowling Green | 1,048 |
| 2023 | Megacorp Pavilion | Newport | 2,700 (Theatre); 6,000 (Amphitheater) |
| May 10, 2008 | Truist Arena | Highland Heights | 9,400 (Full arena); 4,500 (Half-house) |
| November 28, 1976 | Rupp Arena | Lexington | 20,500 (full house); 12,500(Half-house); 8,000(Lower level); 5,000(Theater) |
| July 19, 1887 | Lexington Opera House | Lexington | 1,000 |
| 2009 | Alltech Arena | Lexington | 8,500 |
| 1979 | Singletary Concert Hall | Lexington | 1,467 |
| 2010 | Rolex Stadium | Lexington | 37,338 |
| 1995 | Haggin Auditorium | Lexington | 1,028 |
| Fall 2026 | Gatton Park | Lexington | 4,500 |
| 1963 | Alumni Coliseum | Richmond | 8,000 |
| 2012 | EKU Center for the Arts | Richmond | 2,000 |
| October 10, 2010 | KFC Yum! Center | Louisville | 22,090 |
| 1956 | Freedom Hall | Louisville | 18,749 |
| 1925 | Brown Theatre | Louisville | 1,400 |
| 1928 | The Louisville Palace | Louisville | 2,611 |
| September 5, 1998 | L&N Federal Credit Union Stadium | Louisville | 60,800 |
| 1888 | Iroquois Amphitheatre | Louisville | 2,348 |
| 1927 | Louisville Memorial Auditorium | Louisville | 1,742 |
| November 17, 1983 | Robert S. Whitney Hall | Louisville | 2,479 |
| 1974 | Broadbent Arena | Louisville | 6,600 |
| 2018 | Bourbon Hall | Louisville | 2,500 (General Admission); 2,000 (Reserved) |
| 2021 | Norton Healthcare Sports and Learning Center | Louisville | 6,136 (Center stage); 4,830 (Side stage) |
| February 5, 1949 | Owensboro Sportscenter | Owensboro | 4,822 (Center stage); 3,901 (End stage GA); 3,523 (End stage reserved) |
| 1992 | RiverPark Center | Owensboro | 1,479 |
| 2021 | Schroeder Expo Center | Paducah | 3,872 |
| unknown | Carson Center for the Performing Arts | Paducah | 1,806 |
| October 2005 | Appalachian Wireless Arena | Pikeville | 7,000 |
| 1991 | The Corbin Arena | Corbin | 6,964 |
| unknown | Center for Rural Development | Somerset | 2,300 |
| 1928 | O. Wayne Rollins Center | Williamsburg | 2,870 |

=== Louisiana ===
| Opened | Venue | City | Capacity |
|---|---|---|---|
| 1965; expanded 2017 | Laborde Earles Coliseum and Entertainment Center | Alexandria | 10,000 (Coliseum full house); 6,419 (Coliseum End stage); 1,900 (Entertainment Center general admission); 1,488 (Entertainment Center reserved) |
| 1956 | BREC Memorial Stadium | Baton Rouge | 21,500 |
| 1975 | F. G. Clark Center | Baton Rouge | 7,500 |
| 1925 | Greek Theatre | Baton Rouge | 3,500 |
| 1972 | Pete Maravich Assembly Center | Baton Rouge | 14,192 |
| 1977 | Raising Cane's River Center | Baton Rouge | 10,400 (Arena); 1,800 (Theatre) |
| November 25, 1924 | Tiger Stadium | Baton Rouge | 102,321 |
| unknown | LSU Union Theater | Baton Rouge | 1,269 |
| 1999 | Savoy Arena | Gonzales | 6,600 |
| November 2, 2000 | Brookshire Grocery Arena | Bossier City | 14,000 |
| unknown | Riverdome | Bossier City | 1,300 |
| 2007 | Fredrick C. Hobdy Assembly Center | Grambling | 7,500 |
| 1982 | Pride Roofing University Center | Hammond | 7,500 |
| July 2, 2004 | Florida Parishes Arena | Amite | 4,236 |
| January 6, 1999 | Houma Terrebonne Civic Center | Houma | 5,000 |
| unknown | Houma Municipal Auditorium | Houma | 1,144 |
| 1991 | Pontchartrain Center | Kenner | 3,700 |
| November 10, 1985 | Cajundome | Lafayette | 12,068 |
| 1960 | Heymann Center | Lafayette | 2,168 |
| Spring 2022 | First Horizon Amphitheater | Lafayette | 3,000 |
| 1949 | Blackham Coliseum | Lafayette | 9,800 |
| 1976 | Burton Coliseum | Lake Charles | 9,882 |
| 1972 | Lake Charles Event Center | Lake Charles | 7,450 (Sudduth Coliseum); 1,960 (Rosa Hart Theatre) |
| 1965 | Navarre Stadium | Lake Charles | 14,500 |
| November 16, 2018 | Townsley Law Arena | Lake Charles | 5,200 |
| 1939 | Bulber Auditorium | Lake Charles | 2,000 |
| 1994 | House of Blues | New Orleans | 1,000 |
| January 14, 1977 | Tipitina's | New Orleans | 1,000 |
| 1906 | Civic Theatre | New Orleans | 1,200 |
| August 21, 2010 | Champions Square | New Orleans | 7,000 |
| 1988 | The Howlin' Wolf | New Orleans | 1,200 |
| November 2006 | New Orleans Theatre | New Orleans | 4,032 |
| 1947 | Joy Theater | New Orleans | 1,250 |
| 1983 | Lakefront Arena | New Orleans | 10,000 |
| 1973 | Mahalia Jackson Theater of the Performing Arts | New Orleans | 2,100 |
| August 3, 1975 | Caesars Superdome | New Orleans | 73,208 |
| 1918 | Orpheum Theater | New Orleans | 1,500 |
| February 4, 1927 | Saenger Theatre | New Orleans | 2,600 |
| October 29, 1999 | Smoothie King Center | New Orleans | 17,791 |
| 1937 | Tad Gormley Stadium | New Orleans | 26,500 |
| 2019 | The Fillmore New Orleans | New Orleans | 2,000 |
| unknown | West-Cal Arena | Sulphur | 5,400 |
| 2019 | Lafon Performing Arts Center | Luling | 1,300 |
| 2015 | Jefferson Performing Arts Center | Metairie | 1,500 |
| April 11, 1997 | Gold Mine on Airline | Metairie | 10,000 |
| 1965 | Monroe Civic Center | Monroe | 7,600 (Arena); 2,200 (Jack Howard Theatre) |
| 1971 | b1Bank Fant Coliseum | Monroe | 7,950 |
| 1978 | FMOL Health/St. Francis Stadium | Monroe | 27,617 |
| 2001 | Ike Hamilton Expo Center | West Monroe | 6,560 |
| 1954 | Hirsch Memorial Coliseum | Shreveport | 10,300 |
| 1965 | RiverView Theater | Shreveport | 1,737 |
| 1929 | Shreveport Municipal Memorial Auditorium | Shreveport | 3,024 |
| July 3, 1925 (restored 1984) | Strand Theatre | Shreveport | 1,536 |
| 1925 | Independence Stadium | Shreveport | 53,000 |
| unknown | Harbor Center | Slidell | 2,000 |
| 1970 | Warren J. Harang Jr. Municipal Auditorium | Thibodaux | 3,500 |
| 1970 | Stopher Gymnasium | Thibodaux | 3,800 |
| September 28, 1972 | Manning Field at John L. Guidry Stadium | Thibodaux | 15,000+ (10,500 permanent seats) |

=== Maine ===
| Opened | Venue | City | Capacity |
|---|---|---|---|
| January 2, 1973 | Augusta Civic Center | Augusta | 6,050 |
| 1937 | Snow Pond Center for the Arts | Sidney | 7,000 |
| 1977 | Alfond Arena | Orono | 7,241 |
| 1986 | Hutchins Concert Hall | Orono | 1,435 |
| September 12, 1998 | Alfond Sports Stadium | Orono | 15,000 |
| September 10, 2013 | Cross Insurance Center | Bangor | 8,500 (General Admission); 6,439 (Reserved); 3,221 (Half-house); 2,365 (Theater) |
| July 28, 2010 | Maine Savings Amphitheater | Bangor | 15,000 |
| November 8, 1929 | State Theatre | Portland | 1,870 |
| March 3, 1977 | Cross Insurance Arena | Portland | 9,000 |
| 1915 | Portland Exposition Building | Portland | 3,000 |
| 1912; remodeled 1997 | Merrill Auditorium | Portland | 1,908 |
| April 18, 1994 | Hadlock Field | Portland | 10,750 |
| 1961 | Depot at Thompson's Point | Portland | 6,000 |
| Unknown | Point Community Center | South Portland | 1,600 |
| 1959 | Androscoggin Bank Colisee | Lewiston | 5,477 |
| 2023 | Gay Performing Arts Center | Auburn | 1,200 |
| unknown | Presque Isle Forum | Presque Isle | 5,000 |

=== Maryland ===
| Opened | Venue | City | Capacity |
|---|---|---|---|
| 1991 | Alumni Hall | Annapolis | 6,500 |
| September 1959 | Navy-Marine Corps Memorial Stadium | Annapolis | 40,500 |
| 1981 | Pier 6 Pavilion | Baltimore | 4,400 |
| September 6, 1998 | M&T Bank Stadium | Baltimore | 71,008 |
| October 23, 1962 | CFG Bank Arena | Baltimore | 14,000 |
| December 15, 2004 | Nevermore Hall | Baltimore | 1,500 |
| Halloween 1894 | Lyric Performing Arts Center | Baltimore | 2,564 |
| 2004 | Hippodrome Theatre | Baltimore | 2,300 |
| February 3, 2018 | Chesapeake Employers Insurance Arena | Baltimore | 5,500 |
| April 6, 1992 | Oriole Park at Camden Yards | Baltimore | 48,876 |
| December 1, 2001 | Murphy Fine Arts Center | Baltimore | 2,038 (Gilliam Concert Hall) |
| 2018 | The Hall at Live! | Hanover | 3,825 |
| 1987 | Knott Arena | Emmitsburg | 4,000 |
| 1926 | Weinberg Center | Frederick | 1,183 |
| 1915 | Maryland Theatre | Hagerstown | 1,296 |
| 2009 | Hager Hall Conference and Events Center | Hagerstown | 2,000 |
| unknown | Jim Brown Court at the ARCC | Hagerstown | 5,200 |
| September 14, 1997 | Northwest Stadium | Landover | 62,000 |
| June 19, 2013 | SECU Arena | Towson | 5,200 |
| 1980 | Wicomico Civic Center | Salisbury | 6,787 (Normandy Arena); 3,000 (Normandy Theater) |
| unknown | Maggs Physical Activities Center | Salisbury | 3,000 |
| unknown | Roland E. Powell Convention Center | Ocean City | 5,000 |
| 2014 | Ocean City Performing Arts Center | Ocean City | 1,216 |
| October 11, 2002 | Xfinity Center | College Park | 17,950 |
| 1967 | Merriweather Post Pavilion | Columbia | 19,319 |
| October 2005 | Strathmore | North Bethesda | 1,976 |
| December 8, 2016 | MGM National Harbor Theater | Oxon Hill | 3,000 |
| 2006 | Potomac Ballroom | Oxon Hill | 5,520 |
| 1993 | Show Place Arena | Upper Marlboro | 5,800 |
| unknown | Shipley Arena | Westminster | 5,250 |

=== Massachusetts ===
| Opened | Venue | City | Capacity |
|---|---|---|---|
| 1975 | Tillis Performance Hall | Amherst | 1,850 |
| February 4, 1993 | Mullins Center | Amherst | 10,500 |
| September 5, 1957 | Barnstable Performing Arts Center | Barnstable | 1,400 |
| 1950 | Cape Cod Melody Tent | Barnstable | 2,300 |
| 1914 | Wilbur Theatre | Boston | 1,200 |
| January 24, 1910 | Shubert Theatre | Boston | 1,600 |
| December 20, 1900 | Colonial Theatre | Boston | 1,700 |
| 2009 | House of Blues | Boston | 2,425 |
| 1852 | Orpheum Theatre | Boston | 2,700 |
| March 15, 2022 | Roadrunner | Boston | 3,500 |
| 1925 | Wang Theatre | Boston | 3,500 |
| 1988 | Hynes Convention Center | Boston | 4,000 |
| August 29, 2022 | MGM Music Hall at Fenway | Boston | 5,009 (General Admission); 3,937 (Reserved) |
| 1994 | Leader Bank Pavilion | Boston | 5,200 |
| January 3, 2005 | Agganis Arena | Boston | 8,000 (Arena concerts); 3,500 (Theater) |
| September 30, 1995 | TD Garden | Boston | 19,580 |
| November 14, 1903 | Harvard Stadium | Boston | 30,923 |
| April 20, 1912 | Fenway Park | Boston | 37,402 |
| 1870s | Jordan Hall | Boston | 1,047 |
| October 15, 1900 | Symphony Hall | Boston | 2,625 |
| September 1983 | J. Everett Collins Center for the Performing Arts | Andover | 1,203 |
| 1955 | Kresge Auditorium | Cambridge | 1,200 |
| 1988 | Conte Forum | Chestnut Hill | 8,606 |
| May 17, 2000 | Dukakis Performing Arts Center | Fitchburg | 1,246 |
| May 11, 2002 | Gillette Stadium | Foxborough | 65,878 |
| 1965 | Warren McGuirk Alumni Stadium | Hadley | up to 25,000 (17,000 permanent seats) |
| August 4, 1938 | Seiji Ozawa Hall | Lenox | 1,200 |
| August 4, 1938 | Koussevitzky Music Shed | Lenox | 5,200 |
| 1922 | Lowell Memorial Auditorium | Lowell | 2,800 |
| January 27, 1998 | Tsongas Center | Lowell | 6,496 |
| unknown | South Shore Music Circus | Cohasset | 2,300 |
| 1948 | Lynn Memorial City Hall and Auditorium | Lynn | 2,000 |
| June 13, 1986 | Xfinity Center | Mansfield | 19,900 |
| 1939 | Chevalier Theatre | Medford | 1,900 |
| 1926 | Plymouth Memorial Hall | Plymouth | 1,450 |
| April 13, 1923 | The Zeiterion | New Bedford | 1,200 |
| December 8, 1913 | Symphony Hall | Springfield | 2,600 |
| September 5, 1972 | MassMutual Center | Springfield | 7,743 (Center stage); 5,669 (End stage); 3,856 (Half-house) |
| unknown | Chapin Auditorium | Holyoke | 1,350 |
| unknown | Greene Hall | Northampton | 2,028 |
| October 12, 1916 | Big E Coliseum | West Springfield | 6,875 |
| 1977 | Shriners Auditorium | Wilmington | 4,150 |
| unknown | Sullivan Auditorium | Worcester | 1,096 |
| November 24, 1928 | The Palladium | Worcester | 2,160 |
| 1904 (rebuilt in 2008) | Hanover Theatre & Conservancy for the Performing Arts | Worcester | 2,300 |
| September 2, 1982 | DCU Center | Worcester | 14,800 |

=== Michigan ===
| Opened | Venue | City | Capacity |
|---|---|---|---|
| 1967 | Crisler Center | Ann Arbor | 14,107 |
| 1913; renovated 2002–04 | Hill Auditorium | Ann Arbor | 3,538 |
| January 5, 1928 | Michigan Theater | Ann Arbor | 1,610 |
| 1930s | Rackham Auditorium | Ann Arbor | 1,040 |
| August 2004 | Ewing Performing Arts Center | Saline | 1,050 |
| November 25, 1998 | George Gervin GameAbove Center | Ypsilanti | 9,370 |
| 1914 | Pease Auditorium | Ypsilanti | 1,551 |
| 1969 | Rynearson Stadium | Ypsilanti | 30,000 |
| 1982 | Kellogg Arena | Battle Creek | 5,100 (Center stage); 4,433 (End stage); 6,200 (General Admission) |
| 2012 | FireKeepers Event Center | Battle Creek | 2,100 |
| Unknown | Mendel Center | Benton Harbor | 1,517 |
| 1928 | Royal Oak Music Theatre | Royal Oak | 2,000 |
| September 5, 2017 | Little Caesars Arena | Detroit | 22,000 |
| August 24, 2002 | Ford Field | Detroit | 65,000 |
| April 12, 2000 | Comerica Park | Detroit | 41,782 |
| 1928 | Fox Theatre | Detroit | 5,174 |
| 1993 | Magic Stick | Detroit | 700 |
| 1915 | Majestic Theatre | Detroit | 1,115 |
| 1907 | Saint Andrew's Hall | Detroit | 1,000 |
| 1925; renovated 2007 | The Fillmore | Detroit | 2,900 |
| 2008 | Sound Board Theater at MotorCity | Detroit | 2,400 |
| 1926 | Detroit Masonic Temple | Detroit | 4,742 (Masonic Theater); 1,647 (Jack White Theater) |
| 1928; remodeled 1961 | Fisher Theatre | Detroit | 2,089 |
| January 12, 1922 | Detroit Opera House | Detroit | 2,838 |
| Unknown | Aretha Franklin Amphitheater | Detroit | 6,000 |
| 1919; restored 1989 | Orchestra Hall | Detroit | 2,000 |
| 1928 | Music Hall Center for the Performing Arts | Detroit | 1,731 |
| unknown | Greater Grace Temple | Detroit | 4,000 |
| 1952 | Calihan Hall | Detroit | 8,295 |
| June 25, 1972 | Pine Knob Music Theatre | Clarkston | 15,274 |
| Mid-1980s | Macomb Center for the Performing Arts | Clinton Township | 1,271 |
| unknown | Ford Community and Performing Arts Center | Dearborn | 1,200 |
| 1921 | Emerald Theatre | Mt. Clemens | 1,620 |
| 1966 | Meadow Brook Amphitheatre | Rochester Hills | 7,700 |
| 1970 | Schaublin Auditorium | St. Clair Shores | 1,528 |
| unknown | Southfield Pavilion | Southfield | 2,200 |
| 2000 | Michigan Lottery Amphitheatre at Freedom Hill | Sterling Heights | 7,200 |
| 2005 | Soaring Eagle Outdoor Arena | Mount Pleasant | 11,000 |
| 1958 | Hamilton Auditorium | Trenton | 1,091 |
| 1974 | Athens Auditorium | Troy | 1,575 |
| 1929 | Atwood Stadium | Flint | 15,725 |
| 1969 | Dort Financial Center | Flint | 4,800(reserved); 6,469(General Admission) |
| 1927 | Capitol Theatre | Flint | 1,600 |
| October 1967 | The Whiting | Flint | 2,043 |
| 1988 | Clio Amphitheatre | Clio | 3,000 |
| 2006 | Tartoni Center | Grand Blanc | 2,800 |
| 1921; rebuilt 2023 | Grand Blanc Stadium at Don Batchelor Field | Grand Blanc | 9,000 |
| 2005 | Kern Community Pavilion | Frankenmuth | 3,300 |
| October 8, 1996 | Van Andel Arena | Grand Rapids | 12,860 |
| 2003 | Frederik Meijer Gardens Amphitheater | Grand Rapids | 1,900 |
| 2017 | 20 Monroe Live | Grand Rapids | 2,600 (General admission); 1,448 (Reserved) |
| 1980 | DeVos Performance Hall | Grand Rapids | 2,543 |
| 1976 | Ford Fieldhouse | Grand Rapids | 4,000 |
| 2000 | Hansen Athletics Center | Grand Rapids | 3,000 |
| January 7, 2009 | Van Noord Arena | Grand Rapids | 5,000 |
| May 15, 2026 | Acrisure Amphitheater | Grand Rapids | 12,000 |
| 1998 | DeVos Center for Arts and Worship | Grand Rapids | 1,205 |
| February 1973 | Godwin Heights Auditorium | Wyoming | 1,136 |
| September 2013 | Jenison Center for the Arts | Jenison | 1,251 |
| September 2005 | DeVos Fieldhouse | Holland | 3,898 |
| 1962 | Holland Civic Center | Holland | 2,000 |
| September 2023 | West Ottawa Performing Arts Center | Holland | 1,050 |
| unknown | Ridge Point Church Auditorium | Holland | 1,400 |
| unknown | Allegan County Fair Grandstand | Allegan | 12,000 (5,638 permanent seats) |
| 1982 | GVSU Fieldhouse | Allendale | 5,900 |
| 1960 | Trinity Health Arena | Muskegon | 4,500 |
| 1929 | Frauenthal Center for the Performing Arts | Muskegon | 1,726 |
| unknown | Monroe County Fairgrounds | Monroe | 4,400 (Stock Arena); 10,600 (Grandstand and Track) |
| 1938 | River Raisin Center for the Arts | Monroe | 1,200 |
| Unknown | Silver Creek Event Center | New Buffalo | 1,600 |
| 1973 | Wings Event Center | Kalamazoo | 6,300 |
| 1974 | Lawson Arena | Kalamazoo | 4,000 |
| January 12, 1968 | Miller Auditorium | Kalamazoo | 3,497 |
| July 14, 1927 | State Theater | Kalamazoo | 1,590 |
| 1923 | Chenery Auditorium | Kalamazoo | 1,535 |
| unknown | Adado Riverside Park | Lansing | 15,000 |
| 1925 | Johnson Fieldhouse | Lansing | 4,950 |
| 1987 | Lansing Center | Lansing | 4,000 (Reserved); 5,000 (General Admission) |
| November 1989 | Breslin Center | East Lansing | 15,000 |
| 1940 | MSU Concert Auditorium | East Lansing | 3,600 |
| 1982 | Wharton Center | East Lansing | 2,254 |
| 1930 | Michigan Theatre | Jackson | 1,226 |
| 1976 | Potter Center | Jackson | 1,549 |
| January 21, 1960 | McMorran Place | Port Huron | 3,000 (Arena); 1,157(Theatre) |
| 1972 | Dow Event Center | Saginaw | 7,600 (Wendler Arena); 2,273 (Heritage Theatre) |
| 2017 | Huntington Event Park | Saginaw | 5,500 |
| July 28, 1927 | Temple Theater | Saginaw | 1,750 |
| 1985 | James O'Neill Arena | Kochville | 4,250 |
| 1975 | Harvey Randall Wickes Memorial Stadium | Kochville | 6,800 |
| 1968 | Midland Center for the Arts | Midland | 1,500 |
| unknown | Midland County Fair Center Arena | Midland | 3,920 |
| 1973 (reopened December 2010) | McGuirk Arena | Mt. Pleasant | 6,200 |
| April 1998 | Soaring Eagle Entertainment Hall | Mt. Pleasant | 3,285 |
| May 2005 | Soaring Eagle Outdoor Arena | Mt. Pleasant | 11,000 (General Admission); 5,089 (Reserved) |
| October 1999 | Berry Events Center | Marquette | 5,888 |
| September 1991 | Superior Dome | Marquette | 16,000 (8,000 permanent seats) |
| 1938 | W. C. Peterson Auditorium | Ishpeming | 1,134 |
| 1976 | Norris Events Center | Sault Ste. Marie | 5,700 (Taffy Abel Arena); 4,000(Cooper Gymnasium) |
| unknown | Dreammakers Theater | Sault Ste. Marie | 1,500 |
| 1949 | Kresge Auditorium | Interlochen | 3,929 |
| unknown | Corson Auditorium | Interlochen | 1,049 |
| May 28, 2006 | Turtle Creek Stadium | Blair Township | 6,750 |

=== Minnesota ===
| Opened | Venue | City | Capacity |
|---|---|---|---|
| 2021 | Gichi-Zibii Center for the Arts | Brainerd | 1,200 |
| January 2009 | Ames Center | Burnsville | 1,014 |
| 1988 | Paisley Park | Chanhassen | 1,850 |
| 2010 | AMSOIL Arena | Duluth | 7,377 |
| 1966 | Duluth Entertainment Convention Center | Duluth | 6,477 (Arena); 2,400(Symphony Hall) |
| 2010s | Bayfront Festival Park | Duluth | 15,000 |
| 1935 | Hibbing Memorial Building | Hibbing | 5,465 |
| September 1924 | Hibbing High School Auditorium | Hibbing | 1,800 |
| 1992 | Grand Casino Amphitheater | Hinckley | 65,000 |
| 1995 | Mayo Clinic Health System Event Center | Mankato | 6,500 |
| August 2016 | Mayo Clinic Health System Grand Hall | Mankato | 2,000 |
| 2000 | Taylor Center | Mankato | 5,760 |
| 2010 | Vetter Stone Amphitheatre | Mankato | 12,000 |
| 1954 | Kato Ballroom | Mankato | 1,600 |
| unknown | Aldrich Arena | Maplewood | 5,000 |
| 2016 | US Bank Stadium | Minneapolis | 66,655 |
| 2009 | Huntington Bank Stadium | Minneapolis | 50,805 |
| 2010 | Target Field | Minneapolis | 39,504 |
| October 13, 1990 | Target Center | Minneapolis | 20,500 (General); 2,500-7,500 (U.S. Bank Theater) |
| 1928 | Williams Arena | Minneapolis | 15,575 |
| 1936 | Minneapolis Armory | Minneapolis | 8,400 (General Admission); 5,500 (Reserved) |
| 1929 | Northrop Auditorium | Minneapolis | 2,692 |
| 1921 | Orpheum Theatre | Minneapolis | 2,600 |
| 1921 | State Theatre | Minneapolis | 2,181 |
| 2020 | The Fillmore Minneapolis | Minneapolis | 1,850 |
| 1970 | First Avenue | Minneapolis | 1,550 |
| 1916 | Pantages Theatre | Minneapolis | 1,014 |
| 1990 | Minneapolis Convention Center | Minneapolis | 3,433 (Auditorium); 7,000 (Hall A) |
| 1993 | Ted Mann Concert Hall | Minneapolis | 1,126 |
| 1974 | Orchestra Hall | Minneapolis | 2,000 |
| 2009 | Bluestem Amphitheater | Moorhead | 3,000 |
| 1952 | Memorial Auditorium | Moorhead | 6,925 |
| 2018 | Mystic Lake Center Showroom | Prior Lake | 2,100 |
| 1984 | Mayo Civic Center | Rochester | 7,200 |
| 1938 | Mayo Civic Auditorium | Rochester | 3,000 |
| 1939 | Mayo Presentation Hall | Rochester | 1,038 |
| 1982 | Totino Fine Arts Center | Roseville | 1,500 |
| 2026 | Mystic Lake Amphitheater | Shakopee | 19,000 |
| unknown | Terry Haws Center | St. Cloud | 3,800 |
| 1989 | Herb Brooks National Hockey Center | St. Cloud | 7,763 |
| unknown | The Ledge | Waite Park | 6,000 |
| 2017 | Treasure Island Amphitheater | Welch | 16,000 |
| 2000 | Grand Casino Arena | St. Paul | 19,000 |
| 1909 | State Fair Grandstand | St. Paul | 17,000 |
| 1932 | Roy Wilkins Auditorium | St. Paul | 5,844 |
| 1916 | Palace Theatre | St. Paul | 2,500 |
| 1910 | Fitzgerald Theater | St. Paul | 1,058 |
| January 1, 1985 | Ordway Center for the Performing Arts | St. Paul | 1,900 |
| 2015 | Ordway Concert Hall | St. Paul | 1,100 |
| unknown | Benson Great Hall | St. Paul | 1,500 |
| October 2025 | Anderson Arena | St. Paul | 5,300 |

=== Mississippi ===
| Opened | Venue | City | Capacity |
|---|---|---|---|
| 1977 | Mississippi Coast Coliseum | Biloxi | 10,640 (full house); 6,793 (half house); 4,007 (Theatre) |
| March 1999 | Beau Rivage Theater | Biloxi | 1,820 |
| December 22, 1997 | Studio B | Biloxi | 1,600 |
| 2018 | Brandon Amphitheater | Brandon | 8,300 |
| renovated 2025 | City Hall Live | Brandon | 2,000 |
| unknown | Trotter Convention Center | Columbus | 1,600 |
| unknown | Rent Auditorium | Columbus | 1,218 |
| 2023 | The Sound | Gautier | 8,000 |
| 1979 | Washington County Convention Center | Greenville | 3,840 (Rempson Expo Building); 3,500 (Exhibit Hall) |
| unknown | The iMPAC | Gulfport | 1,200 |
| December 2, 1965 | Reed Green Coliseum | Hattiesburg | 9,050 |
| unknown | Forrest County Multipurpose Center | Hattiesburg | 5,086 |
| 1997 | Lake Terrace Convention Center | Hattiesburg | 1,600 |
| 1999 | Lamar County Multipurpose Center | Purvis | 4,800 |
| 1962 | Mississippi Coliseum | Jackson | 10,000 |
| 1968 | Thalia Mara Hall | Jackson | 2,040 |
| 1950; expanded 1985 | Mississippi Veterans Memorial Stadium | Jackson | 60,492 |
| 1981 | Williams Assembly Center | Jackson | 8,000 |
| unknown | Rose Mccoy Auditorium | Jackson | 1,365 |
| unknown | Wood Coliseum | Clinton | 4,000 |
| 2005 | Trustmark Park | Pearl | 12,500 |
| unknown | Clyde Muse Center | Pearl | 3,000 |
| 1927 | Temple Theatre | Meridian | 1,572 |
| unknown | Lauderdale County Agri-center | Meridian | 4,625 |
| 1915 | Vaught-Hemingway Stadium | Oxford | 64,038 |
| January 7, 2016 | Black Pavilion | Oxford | 9,500 |
| 1988 | Swayze Field | Oxford | 10,323 |
| unknown | Haskell Theatre | Oxford | 1,250 |
| unknown | Jackson County Civic Center | Pascagoula | 2,000 |
| September 16, 2000 | Landers Center | Southaven | 10,000 (Arena); 2,889 (Theater) |
| 2006 | BankPlus Amphitheatre | Southaven | 9,800 |
| December 1, 1975 | Humphrey Coliseum | Starkville | 10,000 |
| 1993 | Cadence Bank Arena | Tupelo | 10,000 (Full house); 7,500 (3/4 house); 5,000 (Half-house); 1,800 (Theater) |

=== Missouri ===
| Opened | Venue | City | Capacity |
|---|---|---|---|
| 2010 | Rockin A Arena | Palmyra | 4,125 |
| November 7, 2009 | Cable Dahmer Arena | Independence | 5,800 |
| October 1925 | Memorial Hall | Joplin | 2,700 |
| 1975 | Taylor Performing Arts Center | Joplin | 2,024 |
| June 14, 1991 | Hollywood Casino Amphitheatre | Maryland Heights | 20,000 |
| November 13, 2008 | Great Southern Bank Arena | Springfield | 11,000 |
| 2010 | O'Reilly Family Events Center | Springfield | 3,600 |
| unknown | Springfield Expo Center | Springfield | 4,500 |
| 1926 | Gillioz Theatre | Springfield | 1,015 |
| unknown | Hammons Hall for the Performing Arts | Springfield | 2,200 |
| 1923 | Abou Ben Adhem Shrine Mosque | Springfield | 3,200 |
| January 11, 2024 | Wilson Logistics Arena | Springfield | 6,300 |
| 1941; renovated 1991 and 2017 | Robert W. Plaster Stadium | Springfield | 17,337 |
| 1993 | Mansion Theater | Branson | 3,000 |
| 1983 | Echo Hollow Amphitheater | Branson | 6,000 |
| 2020s | Aetos Center for the Performing Arts | Nixa | 1,150 |
| 2022 | Thunder Ridge Arena | Ridgedale | 20,000 |
| October 10, 2007 | T-Mobile Center | Kansas City | 18,972 |
| 1974 | Hy-Vee Arena | Kansas City | 8,500 |
| January 6, 1928 | Uptown Theater | Kansas City | 2,400 |
| October 27, 1927 | Midland Theatre | Kansas City | 3,200 |
| June 25, 1951 | Starlight Theatre | Kansas City | 7,958 |
| August 12, 1972 | Arrowhead Stadium | Kansas City | 76,416 |
| September 2011 | Kauffman Center for the Performing Arts | Kansas City | 1,800 |
| 1935 | Kansas City Municipal Auditorium | Kansas City | 10,721 (Arena); 2,363 (Music Hall) |
| April 1973; renovated 2009 | Kauffman Stadium | Kansas City | 39,000 |
| unknown | KCI Expo Center | Kansas City | 5,200 |
| 2021 | Grandview Amphitheatre | Grandview | 5,000 |
| unknown | The Pavilion at John Knox Village | Lee's Summit | 1,500 |
| November 27, 1976 | UCM Multipurpose Building | Warrensburg | 10,000 |
| 1980 | St. Joseph Civic Arena | St. Joseph | 4,200 |
| 1925 | Missouri Theatre | St. Joseph | 1,200 |
| 1981 | MWSU Fieldhouse | St. Joseph | 3,950 |
| October 8, 1994 | Enterprise Center | St. Louis | 19,260 |
| 1929 | Fox Theatre | St. Louis | 4,500 |
| October 19, 2000 | The Pageant | St. Louis | 2,300 |
| April 10, 2008 | Chaifetz Arena | St. Louis | 10,600 |
| November 12, 1995 | The Dome at America's Center | St. Louis | 67,277 |
| April 21, 1934 (reopened in 2011) | Stifel Theatre | St. Louis | 3,100 |
| April 4, 2006 | Busch Stadium | St. Louis | 46,861 |
| November 27, 2022 | Energizer Park | St. Louis | 30,000 |
| July 2021 | The Factory | Chesterfield | 3,000 (General Admission); 2,350 (Reserved) |
| October 1999 | Family Arena | St. Charles | 12,000 |
| July 1987 | Show Me Center | Cape Girardeau | 7,600 (Full arena); 3,998 (Side stage) |
| October 13, 2004 | Mizzou Arena | Columbia | 15,061 |
| 1895; (remodeled and expanded 1953) | Jesse Hall Auditorium | Columbia | 1,784 |
| 1928 | Missouri Theatre | Columbia | 1,182 |
| October 2, 1926 | Faurot Field | Columbia | 61,620 |
| 1960; remodeled 2021 | Capital Region MU Healthcare Amphitheatre | Jefferson City | 2,500 |
| June 3, 2026 | Morton Amphitheater | Riverside | 16,000 |

=== Montana ===
| Opened | Venue | City | Capacity |
|---|---|---|---|
| 1931 | Alberta Bair Theater | Billings | 1,400 |
| 1975 | First Interstate Arena | Billings | 12,000 |
| 1934 | Lincoln Center Auditorium | Billings | 1,636 |
| January 11, 1957 | Brick Breeden Fieldhouse | Bozeman | 8,464 (Arena); 3,459 (Theater at the Brick) |
| September 2021 | The Elm | Bozeman | 1,100 |
| 1999; enclosed 2018 | Haynes Pavilion | Bozeman | 4,275 |
| 1996 | Belgrade Special Events Center | Belgrade | 4,800 |
| 1965 | Alumni Coliseum | Butte | 2,000 |
| 1952 | Butte Civic Center | Butte | 7,500 |
| 1979 | Four Seasons Arena | Great Falls | 5,870 |
| 1930s | Mansfield Theater | Great Falls | 1,780 |
| 1920 | Helena Civic Center Auditorium | Helena | 1,925 |
| 2010s | Lewis and Clark Exhibit Hall | Helena | 3,600 |
| Unknown | Majestic Valley Arena | Kalispell | 7,000 |
| November 2022 | Wachholz College Center | Kalispell | 1,014 |
| December 18, 1953 | Dahlberg Arena | Missoula | 7,321 |
| June 18, 2004 | Ogren Park at Allegiance Field | Missoula | 3,500 |
| October 18, 1986 | Washington–Grizzly Stadium | Missoula | 34,717 |
| 1921 | Wilma Theatre | Missoula | 1,400 |
| 1935 | Dennison Theatre | Missoula | 1,100 |
| July 13, 2017 | KettleHouse Amphitheater | Bonner | 4,000 |

=== Nebraska ===
| Opened | Venue | City | Capacity |
|---|---|---|---|
| 2006 | Heartland Events Center | Grand Island | 7,500 |
| 2000 | Viaero Center | Kearney | 7,800 (General admission); 5,500 (reserved) |
| 2010 | LandMark Implement Arena | Kearney | 5,500 |
| September 2018 | Kearney Performing Arts Center | Kearney | 1,001 |
| 2001 | Wild West Arena | North Platte | 10,000 |
| August 16, 2013 | Pinnacle Bank Arena | Lincoln | 14,620 |
| 2009 | Amy Countryman Arena at TractorHouse Pavilion | Lincoln | 9,816 |
| 2001 | Livestock Market Pavilion | Lincoln | 8,160 (General Admission); 6,684 (Reserved) |
| 1990 | Lied Center for Performing Arts | Lincoln | 2,258 |
| 2012 | Pinewood Bowl | Lincoln | 5,500 |
| September 1923 | Memorial Stadium | Lincoln | 92,000 (85,000 permanent seats) |
| September 24, 2003 | CHI Health Center | Omaha | 17,560 (Arena) |
| October 23, 2015 | Baxter Arena | Omaha | 7,898 |
| 1927 | Orpheum Theatre | Omaha | 2,600 |
| 1926; renovated 2021 | Admiral Theatre | Omaha | 1,500 |
| April 19, 2011 | Charles Schwab Field | Omaha | 36,000 |
| November 2005 | Kiewit Concert Hall | Omaha | 2,005 |
| May 12, 2023 | Steelhouse Omaha | Omaha | 3,000 |
| November 1931 | Witherspoon Concert Hall | Omaha | 1,011 |
| 2023 | Rose Blumkin Performing Arts Center | La Vista | 5,500 (Amphitheater); 2,400 (Astro Theater) |
| October 19, 2012 | Ralston Arena | Ralston | 4,356 |

=== Nevada ===
| Opened | Venue | City | Capacity |
|---|---|---|---|
| unknown | Elko County Fairgrounds Track | Elko | 3,300 |
| 1973 | Horse Palace | Spring Creek | 6,300 |
| March 4, 2022 | Lee's Family Forum | Henderson | 7,267 |
| March 10, 2012 | Reynolds Hall | Las Vegas | 2,050 |
| unknown | Downtown Las Vegas Event Center | Las Vegas | 11,000 |
| June 16, 1971 | Las Vegas Motor Speedway | Las Vegas | 80,000 |
| March 15, 2014 | Laughlin Event Center | Laughlin | 9,000 |
| 2015 | Amphitheater at Craig Ranch | North Las Vegas | 6,800 |
| April 28, 2005 | Encore Theater | Paradise (Note: Many sources list these venues as being in Las Vegas due to their location in the Las Vegas Valley, but are actually in bordering Paradise.) | 1,480 |
| June 24, 2006 | The Venetian Theatre | Paradise | 1,815 |
| 2023 | Voltaire | Paradise | 1,000 |
| March 2, 1999 | House of Blues | Paradise | 2,000 |
| March 17, 2007 | Pearl Concert Theater | Paradise | 2,400 |
| March 8, 2014 | Brooklyn Bowl | Paradise | 3,000 |
| December 29, 2013 | Chelsea Ballroom | Paradise | 3,200 |
| March 25, 2003 | The Colosseum at Caesars Palace | Paradise | 4,100 |
| 1995 | The Theater at Virgin Hotels | Paradise | 4,500 |
| December 1, 2021 | Resorts World Theatre | Paradise | 5,000 |
| December 17, 2016 | Dolby Live | Paradise | 6,400 |
| July 1, 1976 | PH Live | Paradise | 7,000 |
| May 25, 2003 | Orleans Arena | Paradise | 8,921 |
| April 10, 1999 | Michelob Ultra Arena | Paradise | 12,000 |
| December 18, 1993 | MGM Grand Garden Arena | Paradise | 16,800 |
| December 16, 1983 | Thomas & Mack Center | Paradise | 18,574 |
| September 29, 2023 | Sphere at the Venetian Resort | Paradise | 18,600 |
| April 6, 2016 | T-Mobile Arena | Paradise | 20,000 |
| July 31, 2020 | Allegiant Stadium | Paradise | 71,835 |
| 1967 | Pioneer Center for the Performing Arts | Reno | 1,500 |
| January 2005 | Reno Events Center | Reno | 7,500 |
| May 3, 1978 | Grand Sierra Resort & Casino Grand Theatre | Reno | 2,995 |
| November 4, 1983 | Lawlor Events Center | Reno | 11,536 |
| October 1, 1966 | Mackay Stadium | Reno | 27,000 |
| 2019 | Nugget Event Center | Sparks | 8,500 |
| 1944 | Lake Tahoe Outdoor Arena | Stateline | 7,500 |
| September 2023 | Tahoe Blue Event Center | Stateline | 5,300 |
| October 23, 1971 | Sam Boyd Stadium | Whitney | 40,000 |
| July 2, 1969 | Westgate Las Vegas International Theater | Winchester (Note: Though Winchester is considered its own town, the United States Postal Service has assigned Las Vegas addresses to all places within it.) | 1,607 |
| May 9, 2015 | Las Vegas Festival Grounds | Winchester | 85,000 |
| December 2023 | Bleaulive Theatre | Winchester | 3,800 |

=== New Hampshire ===
| Opened | Venue | City | Capacity |
|---|---|---|---|
| 1927 | Capitol Center for the Arts | Concord | 1,304 |
| November 1995 | Whittemore Center | Durham | 7,381 |
| August 16, 1996 | BankNH Pavilion | Gilford | 9,300 |
| August 2003 | Sullivan Arena | Goffstown | 4,000 |
| July 4, 1899 | Hampton Beach Casino Ballroom | Hampton | 2,200 |
| November 15, 2001 | SNHU Arena | Manchester | 11,770 |
| 1936 | Keefe Center for the Arts | Nashua | 1,500 |
| unknown | Rochester Recreation Gymnasium | Rochester | 3,840 |
| unknown | Cheshire Fairgrounds Arena | Swanzey | 3,500 |

=== New Jersey ===
| Opened | Venue | City | Capacity |
|---|---|---|---|
| 1916 | Paramount Theatre | Asbury Park | 1,600 |
| 2002 | Wonder Bar | Asbury Park | 2,000 |
| 2000's | The Stone Pony Summer Stage | Asbury Park | 4,500 |
| 1930 | Asbury Park Convention Hall | Asbury Park | 3,600 |
| Unknown | Atlantic City Beach | Atlantic City | 40,000 |
| 2016 | Adrian Phillips Theater | Atlantic City | 3,200 |
| 1929 | Boardwalk Hall | Atlantic City | 14,770 |
| April 2, 2012 (Revel); June 27, 2018 (Ocean) | Ovation Hall | Atlantic City | 5,500 (General admission); 4,400 (Reserved) |
| July 2, 2003 | Borgata Event Center | Atlantic City | 2,400 |
| July 2, 2003 | The Music Box at the Borgata | Atlantic City | 1,000 |
| November 23, 1981 | Tropicana Showroom | Atlantic City | 2,000 |
| April 28, 1990 (Etess Arena); June 29, 2018 (Hard Rock Live) | Hard Rock Live | Atlantic City | 7,000 |
| 1978 | Resorts Superstar Theater | Atlantic City | 1,300 |
| 1985 | Circus Maximus Theater | Atlantic City | 1,600 |
| June 1995 | Freedom Mortgage Pavilion | Camden | 25,000 |
| April 10, 2010 | MetLife Stadium | East Rutherford | 82,500 |
| April 2026 | Dream Live Performing Arts Center | East Rutherford | 3,000 |
| 1926; restored 1994 | Ritz Theatre | Elizabeth | 2,800 |
| 1930 | Scottish Rite Auditorium | Collingswood | 1,050 |
| 1926; restored 2004 | Bergen Performing Arts Center | Englewood | 1,367 |
| unknown | Bergen County Academies Auditorium | Hackensack | 1,192 |
| March 20, 2010 | Sports Illustrated Stadium | Harrison | 35,000 |
| unknown | Guadagno Auditorium | Hazlet | 1,200 |
| June 12, 1968 | PNC Bank Arts Center | Holmdel | 17,500 |
| 1931 | Margaret Williams Theatre | Jersey City | 1,028 |
| September 28, 1929 (reopened in 2026) | Loew's Jersey Theatre | Jersey City | 4,000 (flexible to 2,600) |
| 1922 | Strand Theater | Lakewood | 1,030 |
| April 6, 2001 | ShoreTown Ballpark | Lakewood | 14,000 |
| August 26, 2009 | OceanFirst Bank Center | West Long Branch | 5,075 |
| unknown | Breslin Auditorium | Lodi | 1,500 |
| 1922 | Wellmont Theater | Montclair | 2,500 |
| 2021 | Carteret Performing Arts Center | Carteret | 2,012 |
| October 25, 2007 | Prudential Center | Newark | 19,500 |
| 1997 | New Jersey Performing Arts Center | Newark | 2,868 (Prudential Hall) |
| 1925 | Newark Symphony Hall | Newark | 3,500 (Sarah Vaughan Hall) |
| November 10, 2017 | Wellness and Events Center | Newark | 4,200 |
| December 26, 1921 | State Theatre New Jersey | New Brunswick | 1,850 |
| September 1961 | West Essex Auditorium | North Caldwell | 1,750 |
| 1894 | Ocean Grove Great Auditorium | Ocean Grove | 6,250 |
| November 30, 1977 | Jersey Mike's Arena | Piscataway | 8,960 |
| September 3, 1994 | SHI Stadium | Piscataway | 52,454 |
| unknown | Plainfield High School Auditorium | Plainfield | 1,525 |
| February 21, 1930 | McCarter Theatre | Princeton | 1,100 (Mathews Stage) |
| 1928 | Union County Performing Arts Center | Rahway | 1,336 (Mainstage Hall) |
| November 11, 1926 | Hackensack Meridian Health Theatre | Red Bank | 1,568 |
| August 1962 (reopened September 6, 2013) | Starland Ballroom | Sayreville | 2,500 |
| unknown | Meadowlands Exposition Center | Secaucus | 5,000 |
| September 1, 1998 | Investors Bank Performing Arts Center | Sewell | 2,350 |
| June 16, 2003 | RWJBarnabas Health Arena | Toms River | 3,108 |
| October 6, 1999 | Cure Insurance Arena | Trenton | 10,500 |
| 1932; restored 1990s | Patriots Theater | Trenton | 1,807 |
| 1957 | Notre Dame Auditorium | Lawrenceville | 1,200 |
| 1970s | Mercer County Festival Grounds | West Windsor Township | 8,000 |
| 2001 | Wildwoods Convention Center | Wildwood | 7,090 |

=== New Mexico ===
| Opened | Venue | City | Capacity |
|---|---|---|---|
| 1990 | Sunshine Theater | Albuquerque | 1,000 |
| 1975 | Popejoy Hall | Albuquerque | 1,985 |
| Unknown | Albuquerque Convention Center | Albuquerque | 2,300 (Kiva Auditorium); 9,048 (Arena) |
| Unknown | Legends Theater at Route 66 Casino | Albuquerque | 2,800 |
| 1957 | Tingley Coliseum | Albuquerque | 11,571 |
| February 2000 | First Financial Credit Union Amphitheater | Albuquerque | 15,000 |
| December 1, 1966 | The Pit | Albuquerque | 15,411 |
| September 17, 1960 | Branch Field at University Stadium | Albuquerque | 48,750 |
| 2002 | Sandia Amphitheatre | Albuquerque | 4,000 |
| 2023 | Revel Entertainment Center | Albuquerque | 3,000 |
| October 21, 2006 | Rio Rancho Events Center | Rio Rancho | 7,000 |
| Unknown | Walter Gerrells Performing Arts Center | Carlsbad | 2,000 |
| Unknown | McGee Park | Farmington | 8,137 (Memorial Coliseum); 5,000 (Convention Center) |
| Unknown | Farmington Civic Center | Farmington | 1,200 |
| Unknown | Lea County Event Center | Hobbs | 7,000 |
| Unknown | Tydings Auditorium | Hobbs | 2,000 |
| November 30, 1968 | Pan American Center | Las Cruces | 12,482 |
| September 15, 1978 | Aggie Memorial Stadium | Las Cruces | 39,665 |
| unknown | Cyclone Center | Stanley | 4,896 |
| August 2008 | Buffalo Thunder Resort and Casino | Santa Fe | 1,400 |
| 2005 | Inn of the Mountain Gods Resort & Casino | Mescalero | 2,000 |

=== New York ===
| Opened | Venue | City | Capacity |
|---|---|---|---|
| October 1931 | Palace Theatre | Albany | 2,844 |
| January 30, 1990 | MVP Arena | Albany | 17,500 |
| 1891 | Washington Avenue Armory | Albany | 4,000 |
| 1994 | UB Center for the Arts | Amherst | 1,748 (Mainstage) |
| July 4, 2006 | Bethel Woods Center for the Arts | Bethel | 16,000 |
| January 31, 2004 | Binghamton University Events Center | Binghamton | 6,100 |
| 1973 | Visions Veterans Memorial Arena | Binghamton | 7,000 |
| April 1920 | Forum Theatre | Binghamton | 1,525 |
| 1985 | Osterhout Concert Theatre | Binghamton | 1,170 (Indoor); 1,500 (Outdoor) |
| unknown | Suffolk Credit Union Arena | Brentwood | 4,800 |
| 1970; rebuilt 1981 | Tilles Center for the Performing Arts | Brockville | 2,188 |
| September 21, 1996 | KeyBank Center | Buffalo | 19,200 |
| January 16, 1926 | Shea's Performing Arts Center | Buffalo | 3,019 |
| 1940 | Kleinhans Music Hall | Buffalo | 2,400 |
| 1982 | Alumni Arena | Buffalo | 6,783 |
| May 1981 | Darien Lake Performing Arts Center | Darien | 21,600 |
| 1974 | Earl W. Brydges Artpark State Park | Lewiston | 10,000 (Amphitheater); 4,400 (Mainstage Amphitheater); 2,400(Mainstage Theater) |
| June 23, 2026 | Highmark Stadium | Orchard Park | 66,000 |
| January 1951 | Appleton Arena | Canton | 4,800 |
| 1925 | Powers Theatre | Elmira | 1,618 |
| 2000 | LECOM Event Center | Elmira | 5,468 |
| 1996 | Tag's Summer Stage | Big Flats | 7,500 |
| 2011 | Glazer Arena | Ithaca | 6,700 |
| 1928 | State Theatre | Ithaca | 1,600 |
| November 20, 2021 | UBS Arena | Elmont | 18,000 |
| 1987 | Catholic Health Amphitheater | Farmingdale | 7,000 |
| January 2, 2000 | Mack Sports and Exhibition Complex | Hempstead | 6,000 |
| September 2011 | The Paramount | Huntington | 1,573 |
| 1874; rebuilt 2017 | Chautauqua Amphitheatre | Jamestown | 4,400 |
| 2002 | Northwest Arena | Jamestown | 3,400 |
| February 5, 1923 | Reg Lenna Center for the Performing Arts | Jamestown | 1,224 |
| 1927 | Ulster Performing Arts Center | Kingston | 1,500 |
| September 20, 1979 | Herb Brooks Arena | Lake Placid | 7,700 |
| February 11, 1968 | Madison Square Garden | New York City | 20,789 |
| 2018 | The Rooftop at Pier 17 | New York City | 3,500 |
| April 2, 2009 | Yankee Stadium | New York City | 46,537 |
| 1903 | New Amsterdam Theatre | New York City | 1,747 |
| 1886 | Webster Hall | New York City | 1,500 |
| May 5, 1891 | Stern Auditorium | New York City | 2,804 |
| 1906 | Hammerstein Ballroom | New York City | 3,500 |
| February 14, 1968 | Infosys Theater | New York City | 5,600 |
| 2007 | Irving Plaza | New York City | 1,025 |
| December 24, 1929 | Beacon Theatre | New York City | 2,894 |
| December 27, 1932 | Radio City Music Hall | New York City | 5,931 |
| 2003 | Terminal 5 | New York City | 3,000 |
| September 19, 2005 | Palladium Times Square | New York City | 2,100 |
| 1908 | BAM Howard Gilman Opera House | New York City | 2,109 |
| 1930 | United Palace | New York City | 3,263 |
| 1962 | Wu Tsai Theater | New York City | 2,200 |
| 1911 | Fort Washington Armory | New York City | 5,000 |
| 1918 | Stephen Sondheim Theatre | New York City | 1,055 |
| September 1966 | Metropolitan Opera House | New York City | 3,975 |
| 1964 | David H. Koch Theater | New York City | 2,586 |
| September 21, 2012 | Barclays Center | New York City | 19,000 |
| June 25, 2016 | Ford Amphitheater at Coney Island | New York City | 5,000 |
| 1908 | Howard Gilman Opera House | New York City | 2,109 |
| February 3, 2015 | Kings Theatre | New York City | 3,000 |
| April 6, 2017 | Brooklyn Steel | New York City | 1,800 |
| 2015 | Tidal Theater | New York City | 6,000 |
| 1928; restored 2024 | Brooklyn Paramount | New York City | 2,000 |
| 2013 | Forest Hills Stadium | New York City | 14,000 |
| 2009 | Citi Field | New York City | 45,000 |
| 1997 | Arthur Ashe Stadium | New York City | 23,000 |
| 2003 | Seneca Niagara Events Center | Niagara Falls | 2,400 |
| 1966 | Reilly Center | Olean | 4,000 |
| 1977 | McCann Arena | Poughkeepsie | 4,150 |
| 1976 | Mair Hall | Poughkeepsie | 3,050 |
| 1929 | Paramount Theatre | Middletown | 1,100 |
| 1923 (Restored 1998) | Patchogue Theatre | Patchogue | 1,102 |
| 1972 | Ronald B. Stafford Ice Arena | Plattsburgh | 2,875 |
| unknown | Crane School of Music | Potsdam | 1,300 |
| October 18, 1955 | Blue Cross Arena | Rochester | 13,784 |
| 1928 | West Herr Auditorium Theater | Rochester | 2,464 |
| 1958 | Kodak Center | Rochester | 1,968 |
| 1907 | Main Street Armory | Rochester | 5,000 |
| 1922 | Eastman Theatre (Kodak Hall) | Rochester | 2,328 |
| 1926 | Temple Theater | Rochester | 1,339 |
| 2004 | Gordon Field House | Henrietta | 7,000 |
| July 2012 | Special Events Recreation Center | Brockport | 5,500 |
| 1894; remodeled 1931 | Smith Center for the Arts | Geneva | 1,405 |
| 1983 | Marvin Sands Performing Arts Center | Hopewell | 15,000 |
| 1998 | Chick-fil-A Arena | Brighton | 4,250 |
| July 9, 1966 | Saratoga Performing Arts Center | Saratoga Springs | 25,100 |
| 1969 | Lowenberg Auditorium | Saratoga Springs | 1,134 |
| 1990 | Stony Brook Arena | Stony Brook | 4,950 |
| 1924 | Michie Stadium | West Point | 40,000 |
| 1975 | Eisenhower Hall | West Point | 4,324 |
| November 1986 | Christl Arena | West Point | 6,000 |
| September 20, 1980 | JMA Wireless Dome | Syracuse | 49,262 |
| 2011 | SRC Arena | Syracuse | 6,500 |
| September 3, 2015 | Empower Federal Credit Union Amphitheater | Syracuse | 17,500 |
| 1951 | Upstate Medical University Arena | Syracuse | 7,000 |
| April 1995 | NBT Bank Stadium | Syracuse | 16,500 |
| 1928 | Landmark Theatre | Syracuse | 2,800 |
| 2010s | Empire Expo Center | Geddes | 6,000 |
| 1875 | Troy Savings Bank Music Hall | Troy | 1,171 |
| October 3, 2008 | Experimental Media and Performing Arts Center | Troy | 1,273 |
| unknown | McDonough Sports Complex Arena | Troy | 5,000 |
| September 10, 1928 | Stanley Theatre | Utica | 2,963 |
| 1959 | Adirondack Bank Center | Utica | 5,700 |
| December 10, 1928 | Capitol Theatre | Rome | 1,744 |
| 1972; remodeled 2017 | Nassau Veterans Memorial Coliseum | Uniondale | 16,000 |
| April 2017 | Nassau Veterans Memorial Theatre | Uniondale | 4,500 |
| 1995 | Turning Stone Event Center | Verona | 5,000 |
| 1952 | Jones Beach Theater | Wantagh | 15,000 |
| 1965; expanded 2019 | Mulcahy's | Wantagh | 1,600 |
| 2009 | Watertown Municipal Arena | Watertown | 4,035 |
| June 18, 1956 | Theatre at Westbury | Westbury | 2,870 |

=== North Carolina ===
| Opened | Venue | City | Capacity |
|---|---|---|---|
| 1974 | Harrah's Cherokee Center | Asheville | 7,654 |
| 1939 | Thomas Wolfe Auditorium | Asheville | 2,431 |
| 2002 | The Orange Peel | Asheville | 1,050 |
| November 7, 2011 | Kimmel Arena | Asheville | 3,800 |
| unknown | Davis Event Center | Fletcher | 3,700 |
| unknown | Odell Williamson Auditorium | Bolivia | 1,500 |
| September 6, 2000 | Holmes Center | Boone | 8,325 |
| renovated 2013 | Schaefer Center for the Performing Arts | Boone | 1,660 |
| Unknown | Alliance Convention Center | Burlington | 1,100 (Prosperity Hall) |
| 1955 | Bojangles Coliseum | Charlotte | 9,605 |
| 1955 | Ovens Auditorium | Charlotte | 2,460 |
| July 4, 1991 | Truliant Amphitheater | Charlotte | 19,500 |
| June 2009 | Skyla Credit Union Amphitheatre | Charlotte | 5,000 |
| June 2009 | The Fillmore Charlotte | Charlotte | 1,900 |
| September 14, 1996 | Bank of America Stadium | Charlotte | 74,867 |
| October 21, 2005 | Spectrum Center | Charlotte | 17,500 (Full arena); 7,000 (Large theater); 4,000 (Spectrum Theatre) |
| December 2, 1996 | Dale F. Halton Arena | Charlotte | 9,000 |
| 1992 | Belk Theatre | Charlotte | 2,097 |
| 2009 | Knight Theatre | Charlotte | 1,193 |
| unknown | Halton Theatre | Charlotte | 1,020 |
| 1927 | Kenan Memorial Stadium | Chapel Hill | 50,500 |
| 1986 | Dean Smith Center | Chapel Hill | 21,750 |
| unknown | Cabarrus Arena | Concord | 5,000 |
| November 20, 2008 | Durham Performing Arts Center | Durham | 2,712 |
| unknown | Page Auditorium | Durham | 1,170 |
| 1922;remodeled 1997 | Weaver Auditorium | Durham | 1,200 |
| February 2, 1926 | Carolina Theatre | Durham | 1,048 |
| 2018 | Schar Center | Elon | 5,100 |
| June 12, 1997 | Crown Coliseum | Fayetteville | 10,880 |
| 1960s | Crown Arena | Fayetteville | 4,500 |
| 1960s | Crown Auditorium | Fayetteville | 2,400 |
| 1995 | Felton J. Capel Arena | Fayetteville | 4,000 |
| 1954 | Seabrook Auditorium | Fayetteville | 1,176 |
| October 29, 1959 | First Horizon Coliseum | Greensboro | 22,000 (Arena); 7,509 (Theater) |
| 1993 | Greensboro Special Events Center | Greensboro | 5,000 |
| June 5, 2011 | White Oak Amphitheatre | Greensboro | 7,600 |
| September 9, 2019 | Piedmont Hall | Greensboro | 2,300 |
| September 2021 | Steven Tanger Center | Greensboro | 3,023 |
| 1927; renovated 2008 | UNCG Auditorium | Greensboro | 1,642 |
| January 27, 1968 | Williams Arena at Minges Coliseum | Greenville | 8,050 |
| September 21, 1963 | Dowdy–Ficklen Stadium | Greenville | 50,000 |
| Unknown | Wright Auditorium | Greenville | 1,500 |
| | Tarlton Complex Arena | Hickory | 2,800 |
| | Monroe Auditorium | Hickory | 1,300 |
| unknown | Duplin County Events Center | Kenansville | 4,200 |
| 2018 | Mooresville Performing Arts Center | Mooresville | 1,660 |
| 1986 | Morganton Municipal Auditorium | Morganton | 1,058 |
| December 14, 1966 | Carter–Finley Stadium | Raleigh | 57,583 |
| July 4, 1991 | Coastal Credit Union Music Park | Raleigh | 20,601 |
| October 29, 1999 | Lenovo Center | Raleigh | 19,772 (full house); 10,000 (Moonlight Theatre-large); 4,000 (Moonlight Theatre) |
| June 4, 2010 | Red Hat Amphitheater | Raleigh | 5,990 |
| 1952 | Dorton Arena | Raleigh | 7,500 |
| 1932 | Raleigh Memorial Auditorium | Raleigh | 2,354 |
| 2001 | Meymandi Concert Hall | Raleigh | 1,587 |
| November 11, 2005 | Weldon Mills Theatre | Roanoke Rapids | 1,450 |
| 2006 (restored in 2025) | Carolina Crossroads Amphitheater | Roanoke Rapids | 30,000 |
| 2018 | Rocky Mount Event Center | Rocky Mount | 4,035 |
| 1996 | The Dunn Center | Rocky Mount | 1,185 (Minges Auditorium) |
| unknown | Astemo Auditorium | Tarboro | 1,080 |
| 1974 | Lee Auditorium | Southern Pines | 1,310 |
| 1913 | Stuart Auditorium | Lake Junaluska | 2,000 |
| November 26, 1977 | Trask Coliseum | Wilmington | 6,100 |
| July 4, 2021 | Live Oak Bank Pavilion | Wilmington | 7,200 |
| unknown | Greenfield Lake Amphitheater | Wilmington | 1,200 |
| October 2015 | Wilson Center | Wilmington | 1,559 |
| August 19, 1989 | Lawrence Joel Coliseum | Winston-Salem | 14,665 |
| 1989 | Winston-Salem Fairgrounds Arena | Winston-Salem | 4,000 |
| September 14, 1968 | Allegacy Federal Credit Union Stadium | Winston-Salem | 31,500 |
| unknown | Williams Auditorium | Winston-Salem | 1,655 |

=== North Dakota ===
| Opened | Venue | City | Capacity |
|---|---|---|---|
| 1969 | Bismarck Event Center | Bismarck | 10,100 |
| 1990s | Dakota Knights Pavilion | Mandan | 2,190 |
| February 10, 2001 | Alerus Center | Grand Forks | 22,000 (Arena); 4,600 (Theater); 1,958 (Ballroom) |
| October 5, 2001 | Ralph Engelstad Arena | Grand Forks | 11,640 |
| 1967 | Chester Fritz Auditorium | Grand Forks | 2,387 |
| 1987 | All Seasons Arena | Minot | 5,300 |
| 1981 | MSU Dome | Minot | 11,000 |
| 1954 | Minot Municipal Auditorium | Minot | 5,000 |
| December 12, 1992 | Fargodome | Fargo | 25,000 (Full house); 12,000 (Half house); 7,500 (North end); 3,500 (Gate City Bank Theatre) |
| unknown | Fargo Civic Center | Fargo | 3,000 |
| October 30, 2008 | Scheels Arena | Fargo | 6,000 |
| October 1970 | Scheels Center | Fargo | 6,325 |

=== Ohio ===
| Opened | Venue | City | Capacity |
|---|---|---|---|
| September 12, 2009 | Infocision Stadium | Akron | 30,000 |
| April 20, 1929 | Akron Civic Theatre | Akron | 3,000 |
| 1920 | Goodyear Hall | Akron | 1,468 (Goodyear Theatre); 3,500 (Rubber City Sports Gymnasium) |
| December 3, 1983 | James A. Rhodes Arena | Akron | 6,450 |
| April 1997 | 7 17 Credit Union Park | Akron | 11,000 |
| October 1973 | E.J. Thomas Hall | Akron | 2,955 |
| 1950 | MAC Center | Kent | 7,287 |
| 1926 (reopened 1980) | Palace Theatre | Canton | 1,488 |
| 1951 | Canton Memorial Civic Center | Canton | 5,250 |
| 2021 | Jackson Township Amphitheatre | Massillon | 3,500 |
| 2015 | Archer Auditorium | Ashland | 1,002 |
| 1969 | Convocation Center | Athens | 15,000 |
| 1928 | Memorial Auditorium | Athens | 2,000 |
| 1929 | Peden Stadium | Athens | 34,000+ |
| September 9, 1975 | Heritage Bank Center | Cincinnati | 17,556 |
| July 4, 1984 | Riverbend Music Center | Cincinnati | 20,500 |
| May 24, 2008 | PNC Pavilion | Cincinnati | 4,100 |
| March 31, 2003 | Great American Ball Park | Cincinnati | 42,059 |
| August 19, 2000 | Paycor Stadium | Cincinnati | 65,515 |
| 1878 | Cincinnati Music Hall | Cincinnati | 2,500 |
| 1915 | Nippert Stadium | Cincinnati | 38,088 |
| 1989 | Fifth Third Arena | Cincinnati | 12,975 |
| 1982 | Timberwolf Amphitheatre | Cincinnati | 10,000 |
| 2021 | Andrew J. Brady Music Center | Cincinnati | 8,000 (Amphitheater); 4,500 (Theater GA); 2,304 (Theater reserved) |
| 1928 | Taft Theatre | Cincinnati | 2,500 |
| 1995 | Procter & Gamble Hall | Cincinnati | 2,719 |
| May 16, 2021 | TQL Stadium | Cincinnati | 34,000 |
| December 2, 1968 | Millett Hall | Oxford | 9,200 |
| 2014 | Matthews Auditorium | Sharonville | 1,012 |
| 2004 | House of Blues | Cleveland | 1,200 |
| March 31, 1913 | Agora Ballroom | Cleveland | 2,000 |
| November 1, 1991 | Wolstein Center | Cleveland | 13,610 |
| October 17, 1994 | Rocket Arena | Cleveland | 20,562 |
| September 12, 1999 | Huntington Bank Field | Cleveland | 67,431 |
| 1987 | Jacobs Pavilion | Cleveland | 5,000 |
| 1917 | Phantasy Theater | Cleveland | Unknown |
| 1922 | Public Auditorium | Cleveland | 10,000 (Arena); 2,800 (Music Hall) |
| 1922 | Connor Palace Theatre | Cleveland | 2,800 |
| 1921 | KeyBank State Theatre | Cleveland | 3,200 |
| 1921 | Cleveland Masonic Temple | Cleveland | 2,500 |
| April 2, 1994 | Progressive Field | Cleveland | 40,000+ |
| 1931 | Severance Hall | Cleveland | 2,000 |
| 2022 | Avon Performing Arts Center | Avon | 1,600 |
| 1954 | Lakewood Civic Auditorium | Lakewood | 2,000 |
| 1928 | Lorain Palace Theatre | Lorain | 1,477 |
| 1973 | Medina Performing Arts Center | Medina | 1,125 |
| 1929 | Hoover Auditorium | Lakeside | 3,750 |
| November 3, 1998 | Value City Arena | Columbus | 20,000 (Full arena); 7,000 (Lower bowl); 3,000 (Theater) |
| September 9, 2000 | Nationwide Arena | Columbus | 20,000 (Full Arena); 8,000 (Lower bowl); 2,500 (Theater) |
| October 7, 1922 | Ohio Stadium | Columbus | 102,780 |
| October 2, 2001 | KEMBA Live! | Columbus | 5,200 (Amphitheatre); 2,200 (Theater) |
| 1980 | Battelle Grand | Columbus | 6,454 |
| 1926 | Palace Theatre | Columbus | 2,695 |
| 1992 | Celeste Center | Columbus | 10,200 |
| March 17, 1928 | Ohio Theatre | Columbus | 2,791 |
| 1957 | Mershon Auditorium | Columbus | 2,477 |
| 1929 | West Auditorium | Columbus | 1,383 |
| July 3, 2021 | ScottsMiracle-Gro Field | Columbus | 25,000+ |
| 1895 | Davis Auditorium | Lancaster | 1,500 |
| 2024 | Tower Event and Conference Center | Marietta | 1,500 |
| December 20, 1928 (Restored 2000) | Midland Theatre | Newark | 1,262 |
| 1981 | Blossom Music Center | Cuyahoga Falls | 23,000 |
| 2003 | Mead Theatre | Dayton | 2,300 |
| December 6, 1969 | University of Dayton Arena | Dayton | 13,435 |
| April 1, 1928 | Dayton Masonic Center | Dayton | 1,700 |
| 1866 | Victoria Theatre | Dayton | 1,165 |
| 1950 | Hobart Arena | Troy | 5,332 |
| December 1, 1990 | Nutter Center | Fairborn | 11,200 |
| May 2, 2015 | Rose Music Center | Huber Heights | 4,200 |
| 1991 | Fraze Pavilion | Kettering | 4,300 |
| October 2005 | Trent Arena | Kettering | 4,400 |
| 1993 | Kuss Auditorium | Springfield | 1,500 |
| 2001 | Champions Center | Springfield | 4,760 |
| 1982 | Pam Evans Smith Arena | Springfield | 4,000 (Full house); 2,482 (Half-house) |
| unknown | BMI Event Center | Versailles | 2,500 |
| 1984 | Crouse Performance Hall | Lima | 1,774 |
| unknown | Schmidthorst Pavilion | Lima | 2,000 |
| May 2023 | Pangle Pavilion at Greater Lima Park and Amphitheatre | Lima | 3,600 |
| unknown | The Cube | Findlay | 4,000 |
| January 18, 1928 | Renaissance Theater | Mansfield | 1,402 |
| 1949 | Veterans Memorial Coliseum | Marion | 5,500 |
| 1928 | Palace Theatre | Marion | 1,400 |
| December 18, 2013 | MGM Northfield Park | Northfield | 1,900 |
| 1995 | Smith Theater | Portsmouth | 1,137 |
| May 2012 | Heminger Center | Tiffin | 4,000 |
| 1928 | Ritz Theater | Tiffin | 1,260 |
| October 3, 2009 | Huntington Center | Toledo | 9,341 (Center stage); 7,286 (End stage); 4,784 (Half-house) |
| 1969 | Stranahan Theater | Toledo | 2,424 |
| 1936 | Toledo Zoo Amphitheater | Toledo | 4,500 |
| 1938 | Glass Bowl | Toledo | 26,248 |
| 1976 | Savage Arena | Toledo | 7,800 (Center stage); 5,500 (End stage); 3,000 (Half-house) |
| March 27, 1987 | Glass City Center | Toledo | 5,900 |
| April 2002 | Fifth Third Field | Toledo | 13,000 |
| June 2023 | Glass City MetroPark | Toledo | 4,000 |
| September 1958 | Whitmer High School | Toledo | 4,500 (Gymnasium); 1,500 (Auditorium) |
| unknown | Thompson Student Center Auditorium | Toledo | 1,500 |
| August 13, 2011 | Stroh Center | Bowling Green | 5,287 |
| unknown | Centennial Terrace | Sylvania | 3,506 |
| December 5, 1926 | Stambaugh Auditorium | Youngstown | 2,553 |
| October 19, 2005 | Covelli Centre | Youngstown | 5,900 |
| May 14, 1931 | Powers Auditorium | Youngstown | 2,303 |
| June 14, 2019 | Youngstown Foundation Amphitheatre | Youngstown | 4,800 |
| December 2, 1972 | Beeghly Center | Youngstown | 7,250 |
| September 4, 1982 | Stambaugh Stadium | Youngstown | 29,000 |
| unknown | Garwood Arena | Columbiana | 5,120 |
| October 15, 1955 | Packard Music Hall | Warren | 2,418 (including obstructed stage view) |
| 1951 | Fritsche Theatre | Westerville | 1,047 |
| 1937 | Secrest Auditorium | Zanesville | 1,776 |

=== Oklahoma ===
| Opened | Venue | City | Capacity |
|---|---|---|---|
| 2009 | Broken Arrow Performing Arts Center | Broken Arrow | 1,500 (Chenoweth Theater) |
| September 2026 | Regent Bank Amphitheatre | Broken Arrow | 12,500 |
| Unknown | Choctaw Grand Theater | Durant | 3,000 |
| Unknown | Baugh Auditorium | Edmond | 1,176 |
| Unknown | Chisholm Trail Expo Center | Enid | 9,000 |
| 2011 | Stride Bank Center | Enid | 3,887 (full arena); 2,500 (Half-house) |
| November 7, 2023 | Lucas Oil Live | Thackerville | 6,500 |
| Unknown | Great Plains Coliseum | Lawton | 3,900 |
| 1955 | McMahon Memorial Auditorium | Lawton | 1,455 |
| February 2017 | Apache Casino Hotel Showroom | Lawton | 1,200 |
| 1967 | Muskogee Civic Center | Muskogee | 3,710 |
| August 30, 2008 | BOK Center | Tulsa | 19,199 |
| September 2003 | Union Multipurpose Activity Center | Tulsa | 5,662 |
| 1924 | Cain's Ballroom | Tulsa | 1,800 |
| October 22, 1914 | Tulsa Theater | Tulsa | 2,800 |
| March 19, 1977 | Chapman Music Hall | Tulsa | 2,365 |
| December 19, 1998 | Reynolds Center | Tulsa | 9,315 |
| 1972 | Mabee Center | Tulsa | 11,300 (Arena); 4,200 (Johnston Theatre) |
| 2019 | Skyline Event Center | Tulsa | 2,000 |
| unknown | Claremore Expo Center | Claremore | 6,693 |
| June 8, 2002 | Paycom Center | Oklahoma City | 18,203 (full house); 3,613 (Theater) |
| July 2025 | OG&E Coliseum | Oklahoma City | 8,000 |
| 1937 | Tower Theater | Oklahoma City | 1,027 |
| 1936 | Zoo Amphitheatre | Oklahoma City | 8,500 |
| October 4, 1937 | Gaylord Performing Arts Theater | Oklahoma City | 2,477 |
| 2016 | The Criterion | Oklahoma City | 3,000 (General Admission); 1,200 (Reserved) |
| unknown | Hudiburg Chevrolet Center | Oklahoma City | 1,420 |
| unknown | Kirkpatrick Auditorium | Oklahoma City | 1,100 |
| unknown | Visual and Performing Arts Center | Oklahoma City | 1,049 |
| October 27, 1975 | Lloyd Noble Center | Norman | 11,528 |
| 2006 | Showplace Theatre | Norman | 1,500 |
| 1954 | Clinton Theatre | Norman | 1,200 |
| remodeled 2024 | Benson Auditorium | Norman | 1,400 |
| September 1925 (Expanded 1929, 1947, 1954, 1980, 2003 and 2016) | Gaylord Family Oklahoma Memorial Stadium | Norman | 80,126 |
| unknown | FireLake Arena | Shawnee | 5,000 |
| 2010s | McKnight Center for the Performing Arts | Stillwater | 1,035 |

=== Oregon ===
| Opened | Venue | City | Capacity |
|---|---|---|---|
| 2002 | Hayden Homes Amphitheater | Bend | 8,000 |
| 1982 | Silva Concert Hall | Eugene | 2,448 |
| January 13, 2011 | Matthew Knight Arena | Eugene | 12,364 |
| unknown | Lane Events Center | Eugene | 5,285 (Exhibit Hall GA); 4,000 (Exhibit Hall Reserved); 3,140 (Performance Hall GA); 1,700 (Performance Hall Reserved) |
| 1982 | McDonald Theatre | Eugene | 1,010 |
| Unknown | Cuthbert Amphitheatre | Eugene | 5,000 |
| Unknown | First Interstate Bank Center | Redmond | 7,800 |
| 1939 | Marshfield Auditorium | Coos Bay | 1,092 |
| Unknown | Benton County Indoor Arena | Corvallis | 3,600 |
| Unknown | Austin Auditorium | Corvallis | 1,191 |
| October 24, 1953 | Reser Stadium | Corvallis | 45,674 |
| 1949 | Gill Coliseum | Corvallis | 10,261 |
| 1953 | Josephine County Fairgrounds Indoor Arena | Grants Pass | 2,500 |
| Unknown | Douglas County Fair and Expo Center | Roseburg | 2,500 (Douglas and Exhibit Halls) |
| Unknown | Jacoby Auditorium | Roseburg | 1,010 |
| Unknown | Swanson Amphitheatre | Roseburg | 5,000 |
| August 29, 1930 | Holly Theatre | Medford | 1,008 |
| Unknown | Jackson County Fairground and Expo Park | Central Point | 5,216 (Seven Feathers Event Center); 6,000 (Bi-Mart Amphitheatre) |
| Unknown | John Hancock Arena | Klamath Falls | 9,728 (General admission); 4,480 (Reserved) |
| Unknown | Pendleton Round-Up Stadium | Pendleton | 25,000 |
| Unknown | Happy Canyon Arena | Pendleton | 3,800 |
| Unknown | Pendleton Convention Center | Pendleton | 3,430 |
| October 12, 1995 | Moda Center | Portland | 19,980 (Arena); 6,500 (Theater of the Clouds) |
| 1960 | Veterans Memorial Coliseum | Portland | 12,888 |
| 1917 | Keller Auditorium | Portland | 3,034 |
| 1928 | Arlene Schnitzer Concert Hall | Portland | 2,776 |
| 1982 | Roseland Theater | Portland | 1,400 |
| 1926 | Providence Park | Portland | 32,000 |
| Unknown | Calapooia Arena | Albany | 4,556 |
| unknown | Bauman Auditorium | Newberg | 1,119 |
| 1911 | Mcmenamins Edgewood Lawn | Troutdale | 7,000 |
| 2004 | Oregon State Fair Pavilion | Salem | 7,000 |
| 1960s | Salem Armory Auditorium | Salem | 3,400 |
| May 28, 1926 | Elsinore Theatre | Salem | 1,290 |
| unknown | L. B. Day Amphitheatre | Salem | 8,900 |

=== Pennsylvania ===
| Opened | Venue | City | Capacity |
|---|---|---|---|
| 1908 | Theatre of Living Arts | Philadelphia | 1,000 |
| September 21, 2011 | Union Transfer | Philadelphia | 1,200 |
| 1968; restored 1995 | Franklin Music Hall | Philadelphia | 3,000 |
| November 11, 1997 | Liacouras Center | Philadelphia | 10,206 (Arena); 5,000(Esther Boyer Theatre) |
| April 3, 2004 | Citizens Bank Park | Philadelphia | 43,647 |
| 1935 | TD Pavilion | Philadelphia | 13,000 |
| August 13, 1996 | Xfinity Mobile Arena | Philadelphia | 19,500 |
| April 20, 1895 | Franklin Field | Philadelphia | 52,593 |
| August 3, 2003 | Lincoln Financial Field | Philadelphia | 67,594 |
| December 16, 2001 | Marian Anderson Hall | Philadelphia | 2,500 |
| 1857 | Academy of Music | Philadelphia | 2,509 |
| 1908 (restored and reopened December 3, 2018) | The Met Philadelphia | Philadelphia | 3,800 |
| January 1, 1927 | The Palestra | Philadelphia | 8,722 |
| late 2015 | The Fillmore | Philadelphia | 2,500 |
| 1932 | Irvine Auditorium | Philadelphia | 1,276 |
| 2012 | Highmark Skyline Stage | Philadelphia | 7,500 |
| 1929 | Dell Music Center | Philadelphia | 5,944 |
| 1928; restored 1988 | Keswick Theatre | Glenside | 1,300 |
| 1927 | Tower Theater | Upper Darby | 2,852 |
| 1927 | Asplundh Concert Hall | West Chester | 1,202 |
| September 10, 2014 | PPL Center | Allentown | 10,500 (Center stage); 8,750 (End stage); 6,500 (3/4 stage); 4,000 (Half-house); 3,000 (Theater) |
| 1852 | Allentown Fairgrounds | Allentown | 124,172 |
| April 2008 | Coca-Cola Park | Allentown | 15,000 |
| 1998 | Penn's Peak | Jim Thorpe | 2,000 |
| 1928; restored 2004 | Sherman Theater | Stroudsburg | 1,800(General Admission); 1,250(Reserved) |
| September 30, 1929 | Jaffa Shrine Center | Altoona | 4,000 |
| unknown | Mansion Park | Altoona | 10,400 |
| unknown | Adler Arena | Altoona | 2,500 |
| May 1, 2001 | Blair County Convention Center Ballroom | Altoona | 1,800 |
| 1926 | Sargent's Stadium | Johnstown | 11,000 |
| 1950 | 1st Summit Arena | Johnstown | 4,182 |
| 2011 | Peoples’ Natural Gas Park | Johnstown | 4,000 (including lawn area) |
| unknown (Renovated 1981 and 2007) | Mitrani Hall | Bloomsburg | 1,855 |
| 1997 | American Music Theatre | Lancaster | 1,607 |
| unknown | Freedom Hall | Lancaster | 6,500 |
| 1966 | New Holland Arena | Harrisburg | 7,600 |
| 1930 | Zembo Shrine Auditorium | Harrisburg | 2,437 |
| September 1931 | Forum Auditorium | Harrisburg | 1,610 |
| January 2006 | Luhrs Performing Arts Center | Shippensburg | 1,500 (Grove Theatre) |
| March 2011 | Ed Fry Arena | Indiana | 4,704 |
| 1939 | Fisher Auditorium | Indiana | 1,460 |
| May 1974 | Eisenhower Auditorium | University Park | 2,500 |
| January 11, 1996 | Bryce Jordan Center | University Park | 15,451 (Arena); 4,121 (Bryce Theater) |
| September 17, 1960 | Beaver Stadium | University Park | 106,572 |
| 1929 | Roxian Theatre | McKees Rocks | 1,400 |
| 1926 | Scottish Rite Cathedral | New Castle | 2,790 |
| unknown | Orr Auditorium | New Wilmington | 1,772 |
| August 18, 2010 | PPG Paints Arena | Pittsburgh | 19,758 |
| March 31, 2001 | PNC Park | Pittsburgh | 38,496 |
| August 18, 2001 | Acrisure Stadium | Pittsburgh | 68,400 |
| April 27, 2002 | Petersen Events Center | Pittsburgh | 13,592 |
| December 2010 | Stage AE | Pittsburgh | 5,500 (Amphitheater); 2,400 (Music Hall) |
| 1927 | Benedum Center | Pittsburgh | 2,800 |
| 1926; remodeled 1971 and 2015 | Heinz Hall | Pittsburgh | 2,661 |
| 1910 | Soldiers and Sailors Memorial Hall | Pittsburgh | 2,355 |
| 1895 | Carnegie Music Hall | Pittsburgh | 1,900 |
| May 2019 | UPMC Cooper Fieldhouse | Pittsburgh | 4,950 |
| December 3, 2011 | Pennwest California Convocation Center | California | 6,000 |
| 1965 | Rostraver Ice Garden | Belle Vernon | 6,000 |
| 1926 | Palace Theatre | Greensburg | 1,327 |
| 1922 (reopened 2021) | State Theatre Center for the Arts | Uniontown | 1,400 |
| 2014 | Wind Creek Event Center | Bethlehem | 3,700 (General Admission); 2,550 (Reserved) |
| 1979 | Stabler Arena | Bethlehem | 6,200 |
| 1997 | Baker Hall | Bethlehem | 1,017 |
| October 1, 1988 | Goodman Stadium | Bethlehem | 24,000 |
| 1986 | Wind Creek Steel Stage at PNC Plaza | Bethlehem | 6,500 |
| September 2001 | Santander Arena | Reading | 8,800 |
| 1922 | Santander Performing Arts Center | Reading | 1,700 |
| 1971 | Keystone Hall | Kutztown | 4,350 |
| June 24, 2000 | The Pavilion | Scranton | 16,000 |
| September 1923 (renovated 1996) | Peoples Security Bank Theater | Scranton | 1,052 |
| 1930 | Weinberg Theatre | Scranton | 1,866 |
| 1926; restored 2011 | Wiltsie Center | Hazleton | 1,140 |
| 1998 | Pikes Peak | Jim Thorpe | 1,800 |
| 1989 | PNC Field | Moosic | 15,000 |
| November 13, 1999 | Mohegan Arena at Casey Plaza | Wilkes-Barre | 10,000 (Full arena); 6,283 (Extended half house); 3,985 (Theater) |
| August 18, 1938; restored 1986 | F. M. Kirby Center | Wilkes-Barre | 1,832 |
| unknown | Poconos Park Amphitheater | Bushkill | 10,000 |
| 1928; restored 1993 | Martin Theatre | Williamsport | 2,100 |
| September 2003 | UPMC Arena | York | 5,500 |
| 1925 | Strand Theatre | York | 1,262 |
| August 25, 2005 | Pullo Center for the Performing Arts | York | 1,016 |
| September 1933 | Hershey Theatre | Hershey | 1,904 |
| October 15, 2002 | Giant Center | Hershey | 10,500 |
| 1936 | Hersheypark Arena | Hershey | 7,286 |
| May 18, 1939 | Hersheypark Stadium | Hershey | 30,000 |
| May 18, 1939 | Star Pavilion | Hershey | 8,000 |
| April 10, 1931 | Warner Theatre | Erie | 2,250 |
| 1924 | Erie Veterans Memorial Stadium | Erie | 15,000 |
| 1983 | Erie Insurance Arena | Erie | 8,445 |
| unknown | Highmark Amphitheatre | Erie | 5,000 |
| 1949 | Highmark Events Center | Erie | 3,750 |
| June 17, 1990 | The Pavilion at Star Lake | Burgettstown | 23,000 |

=== Rhode Island ===
| Opened | Venue | City | Capacity |
|---|---|---|---|
| September 1925 | Brown Stadium | Providence | 20,000 |
| January 27, 1950 | Veterans Memorial Auditorium | Providence | 1,931 |
| June 12, 1915 | Strand Ballroom & Theatre | Providence | 1,980 |
| 1928 | Providence Performing Arts Center | Providence | 3,100 |
| November 3, 1972 | Amica Mutual Pavilion | Providence | 12,400 |
| June 20, 2002 | Ryan Center | South Kingstown | 8,400 |
| 1926 | Stadium Theatre Performing Arts Centre & Conservatory | Woonsocket | 1,088 |

=== South Carolina ===
| Opened | Venue | City | Capacity |
|---|---|---|---|
| April 2007 | USC Aiken Convocation Center | Aiken | 4,100 |
| 1999 | Floyd Amphitheater | Anderson | 12,000 |
| November 14, 2008 | TD Arena | Charleston | 5,100 |
| 1939 | McAlister Field House | Charleston | 6,960 |
| July 1968; rebuilt 2015 | Rivers Performance Hall | Charleston | 1,800 |
| 2001 | Credit One Stadium | Charleston | 10,200 |
| September 19, 1942 | Memorial Stadium (Clemson) | Clemson | 81,500 |
| November 21, 2002 | Colonial Life Arena | Columbia | 18,000 |
| 1988 | Gonzales Hall | Columbia | 2,256 |
| 1930 | Township Auditorium | Columbia | 3,072 (reserved); 3,383 (general admission) |
| June 2018 | The Senate | Columbia | 1,200 |
| 1934 | Williams–Brice Stadium | Columbia | 77,559 |
| unknown | Lower Richland Auditorium | Hopkins | 1,050 |
| August 2012 | HTC Center | Conway | 4,250 |
| September 2003 (Expanded 2010 and 2017-19) | Brooks Stadium | Conway | 29,000 (20,000 permanent seats) |
| 1993 | Florence Center | Florence | 10,000 |
| March 7, 1996 | Bon Secours Wellness Arena | Greenville | 15,500 (Full arena); 3,710 (Theater) |
| November 10, 1990 | Peace Center | Greenville | 2,112 |
| August 1996 | Timmons Arena | Greenville | 6,000 |
| March 2, 2018 | The Firmament | Greenville | N/A |
| Unknown | Rodehaver Auditorium | Greenville | 2,600 |
| Unknown | McAlister Auditorium | Greenville | 1,850 |
| 1981 | Paladin Stadium | Greenville | 20,000+ |
| unknown | Omar Shrine Auditorium | Mount Pleasant | 2,000 |
| 1967 | Myrtle Beach Convention Center | Myrtle Beach | 3,570 |
| 1993 | Calvin Gilmore Theatre | Myrtle Beach | 1,800 |
| 1990 | Music and Arts Center | Myrtle Beach | 1,900 |
| January 29, 1993 | North Charleston Coliseum | North Charleston | 13,295 |
| unknown | Amphitheatre at the Point | North Charleston | 15,000 |
| 1999 | North Charleston Performing Arts Center | North Charleston | 2,300 |
| 1997 | House of Blues | North Myrtle Beach | 2,100 |
| 1993 | Alabama Theatre | North Myrtle Beach | 1,993 |
| February 8, 1968 | SMH Memorial Center | Orangeburg | 4,000 |
| 2005 | CCNB Amphitheatre | Simpsonville | 15,000 |
| 1951 | Spartanburg Memorial Auditorium | Spartanburg | 3,244 |
| 2017 | Jerry Richardson Indoor Stadium | Spartanburg | 4,500 |
| 1899 | Twitchell Auditorium | Spartanburg | 1,472 |
| unknown | Summers Corner Performing Arts Center | Summerville | 1,018 |
| 1939; renovated 2025 | Byrnes Auditorium | Rock Hill | 3,000 |
| October 1982 | Winthrop Coliseum | Rock Hill | 7,050 |
| 1950s | Scott Center Auditorium | Rock Hill | 1,100 |

=== South Dakota ===
| Opened | Venue | City | Capacity |
|---|---|---|---|
| June 21, 1977 | The Monument | Rapid City | 5,157 (Arena); 1,690 (Theatre) |
| June 21, 1977 | Don Barnett Arena | Rapid City | 10,436 |
| September 19, 2014 | Denny Sanford Premier Center | Sioux Falls | 13,000 |
| 1961 | Sioux Falls Arena | Sioux Falls | 8,000 |
| 2017 | Levitt at the Falls | Sioux Falls | 5,000 |
| 1909 | Husby Performing Arts Center | Sioux Falls | 1,900 |
| 1981 | Buffalo Chip Campground | Sturgis | 100,000 |

=== Tennessee ===
| Opened | Venue | City | Capacity |
|---|---|---|---|
| November 11, 1922 | Soldiers and Sailors Memorial Auditorium | Chattanooga | 3,866 |
| October 8, 1982 | McKenzie Arena | Chattanooga | 11,904 |
| September 1997 | Finley Stadium | Chattanooga | 29,000 |
| 1921 | Tivoli Theatre | Chattanooga | 1,780 |
| 1889 (restored 1998) | First Horizon Pavilion | Chattanooga | 5,000 |
| unknown | The Signal | Chattanooga | 2,000 |
| October 2023 | F&M Bank Arena | Clarksville | 6,000 |
| unknown | Wilma Rudolph Amphitheater | Clarksville | 5,000 |
| unknown | Conn Center | Cleveland | 1,541 |
| 1967 | Oman Arena | Jackson | 5,600 |
| April 1998 | The Ballpark at Jackson | Jackson | 9,000 |
| 1973 | Carl Perkins Civic Center | Jackson | 2,200 |
| unknown | Casey Jones Village Amphitheater | Jackson | 3,200 (700 seats, 2,500 lawn) |
| September 6, 2004 | FedExForum | Memphis | 18,119 |
| March 2, 2017 | Graceland Soundstage | Memphis | 2,500 (General Admission); 1,500 (Reserved) |
| March 1, 2022 | Memphis Music Room | Memphis | 1,000 |
| September 16, 1965 | Simmons Bank Liberty Stadium | Memphis | 62,380 |
| 1983 | New Daisy Theatre | Memphis | 1,083 |
| unknown | Minglewood Hall | Memphis | 1,600 |
| unknown | Mud Island Amphitheater | Memphis | 5,000 |
| 1928 | Orpheum Theatre | Memphis | 2,300 |
| August 4, 1986 | ShowPlace Arena | Memphis | 7,625 |
| 2003 | Cannon Center for the Performing Arts | Memphis | 2,072 |
| 2011 | Marathon Music Works | Nashville | 1,500 |
| 1892 | Ryman Auditorium | Nashville | 2,362 |
| March 16, 1974 | Grand Ole Opry House | Nashville | 4,400 |
| October 1, 2026 | The Truth | Nashville | 4,400 |
| March 2025 | The Pinnacle | Nashville | 4,500 |
| 1922 (reopened in 1981) | Vanderbilt Stadium | Nashville | 39,790 |
| December 18, 1996 | Bridgestone Arena | Nashville | 20,000 |
| May 3, 1997 | Nissan Stadium | Nashville | 69,143 |
| July 30, 2015 | Ascend Amphitheater | Nashville | 6,800 |
| 1925 | War Memorial Auditorium | Nashville | 2,044 |
| September 9, 2006 | Laura Turner Concert Hall | Nashville | 1,844 |
| January 2003 | Cannery Ballroom | Nashville | 1,000 |
| 1952 | Memorial Gymnasium | Nashville | 15,275 |
| 1962 | Nashville Municipal Auditorium | Nashville | 9,654 |
| 2012 | Carl Black Chevy Woods Amphitheatre | Nashville | 4,500 |
| 2001 | Allen Arena | Nashville | 5,028 |
| September 8, 2003 | Curb Event Center | Nashville | 5,500 |
| 1980 | Tennessee Performing Arts Center | Nashville | 2,472 (Jackson Hall); 1,075 (Polk Theatre); 264 (Johnson Theater) |
| unknown | Fisher Center | Nashville | 1,727 |
| May 1, 2022 | Geodis Park | Nashville | 40,000 |
| 2021 | FirstBank Amphitheater | Franklin | 7,500 |
| unknown | Farm Bureau Expo Center | Lebanon | 6,600 |
| December 3, 1987 | Thompson–Boling Arena | Knoxville | 21,678 |
| 1982 | Tennessee Amphitheater | Knoxville | 7,500 |
| 1961 | Knoxville Civic Auditorium and Coliseum | Knoxville | 6,500 (Coliseum); 2,500 (Auditorium) |
| unknown | Chilhowee Park Amphitheater | Knoxville | 4,500 |
| October 1, 1928 | Tennessee Theatre | Knoxville | 1,645 |
| 1969 | Bearden Auditorium | Knoxville | 1,185 |
| unknown | Nutt Theatre | Maryville | 1,068 |
| 1971 | Melton Lake Park | Oak Ridge | 4,000 (North Side Pavilion); 1,500 (South Side Pavilion) |
| 2010 | LeConte Center | Pigeon Forge | 12,000 |
| Unknown | Great Smoky Mountains Expo Center | White Pine | 8,700 |
| 1974 | Freedom Hall Civic Center | Johnson City | 8,500 |
| November 2020 | Martin Center for the Arts | Johnson City | 1,200 |
| 1977 | Ballad Health Athletic Center | Johnson City | 12,000 |
| 2012 | Memorial Park Amphitheater | Johnson City | 3,000 |
| unknown | Reid Employee Center Auditorium | Kingsport | 1,710 |
| December 12, 1972 | Murphy Center | Murfreesboro | 11,520 |
| October 14, 1933 | Floyd Stadium | Murfreesboro | 40,000 |
| unknown | Miller Coliseum | Murfreesboro | 9,100 |
| 1946 | Celebration Stadium | Shelbyville | 30,000 |
| unknown | Cooper Steel Arena | Shelbyville | 7,000 |

=== Texas ===
| Opened | Venue | City | Capacity |
|---|---|---|---|
| November 6, 2009 | Credit Union of Texas Event Center | Allen | 6,275 |
| 2011 | Allen Performing Arts Center | Allen | 1,500 |
| unknown | Taylor Telecom Arena | Abilene | 9,203 |
| 1959 | Shotwell Stadium | Abilene | 22,000 |
| 2017 | Anthony Field at Wildcat Stadium | Abilene | 18,000 |
| 1968 | Moody Coliseum | Abilene | 4,550 |
| 1930 | Paramount Theatre | Abilene | 1,187 |
| November 21, 1970 | Abilene Auditorium | Abilene | 2,181 |
| unknown | Lime Rock Amphitheater | Tuscola | 5,000 |
| unknown | Cal Farley Coliseum | Amarillo | 4,987 |
| August 31, 1968 | Amarillo Civic Auditorium | Amarillo | 2,310 |
| 2006 | Globe-News Center for the Performing Arts | Amarillo | 1,300 |
| 2000 | Amarillo National Center | Amarillo | 10,000 |
| unknown | Starlight Ranch | Amarillo | 2,500 |
| September 2002 | First United Bank Center | Canyon | 5,800 |
| unknown | Henderson Regional Fair Park Arena | Athens | 4,500 |
| 1915 | Paramount Theatre | Austin | 1,270 |
| 1992 | Emo's | Austin | 1,850 |
| 1986 | Stubb’s Waller Creek Amphitheater | Austin | 2,100 |
| 1959 | Michael & Susan Hall | Austin | 2,442 |
| February 2011 | Moody Theater | Austin | 2,750 (General admission); 2,100 (Reserved) |
| 2022 | Moody Center | Austin | 15,000 |
| November 17, 2012 | Germania Insurance Amphitheater | Austin | 14,000 |
| 1983 | Luedecke Arena | Austin | 9,400 |
| 2021 | Moody Amphitheater | Austin | 5,000 |
| June 2021 | Q2 Stadium | Austin | 28,000 |
| 1981 | Bass Concert Hall | Austin | 3,000 |
| 2003 | Delco Activity Center | Austin | 5,000 |
| May 27, 2009 | AT&T Stadium | Arlington | 80,000 |
| 2005 | MetroCenter | Arlington | 1,750 |
| March 23, 2020 | Globe Life Field | Arlington | 40,300 |
| April 1, 1994 | Choctaw Stadium | Arlington | 48,000 |
| 2012 | College Park Center | Arlington | 6,750 |
| 1965 | Texas Hall | Arlington | 2,625 |
| 2003 | Doggett Ford Park | Beaumont | 9,000(Arena); 2,300(Doggett Ford Theater); 14,300 (Amphitheater) |
| 1927 | Jefferson Theatre | Beaumont | 1,400 |
| 1928 | Julie Rogers Theater | Beaumont | 1,663 |
| November 24, 1984 | Montagne Center | Beaumont | 10,746 |
| 1964 | Provost Umphrey Stadium | Beaumont | 24,000 |
| 1987 | Garth Arena | Belton | 8,000 |
| Unknown | Jacob Brown Auditorium | Brownsville | 1,500 |
| Unknown | Brownsville Event Center | Brownsville | 1,200 (Palo Alto Grand Ballroom) |
| June 10, 2008 | H-E-B Center | Cedar Park | 8,000 (Center stage); 6,500 (End stage); 4,100 (Half-house) |
| November 22, 1998 | Reed Arena | College Station | 12,989 |
| September 24, 1927 | Kyle Field | College Station | 102,733 |
| Unknown | Wolf Pen Creek Amphitheater | College Station | 7,000 |
| Unknown | Rudder Auditorium | College Station | 2,500 |
| 2002 | Lone Star Expo Center | Conroe | 7,500 |
| October 2004 | Hilliard Center | Corpus Christi | 10,323 (Center stage); 9,714 (End stage); 5,200 (Half-house); 4,454 (Lower bowl) |
| 1979 | Selena Auditorium | Corpus Christi | 2,500 |
| April 2005 | H-E-B Performance Hall | Corpus Christi | 1,350 |
| 2001 | Concrete Street Amphitheater | Corpus Christi | 10,000 (Amphitheater); 3,000 (Old Market Pavilion) |
| 2006 | Berry Center of Northwest Houston | Cypress | 9,500 |
| July 17, 2001 | American Airlines Center | Dallas | 20,000 |
| 1993 | The Bomb Factory | Dallas | 4,300 |
| June 1971 | South Side Ballroom | Dallas | 4,000 |
| 1930 | Cotton Bowl | Dallas | 92,100 |
| 2007 | House of Blues | Dallas | 1,750 |
| 1921 | Majestic Theatre | Dallas | 1,704 |
| 1988 | Dos Equis Pavilion | Dallas | 20,000 |
| October 12, 2009 | Margot and Bill Winspear Opera House | Dallas | 2,300 |
| 1926 | McFarlin Memorial Auditorium | Dallas | 2,386 |
| 1955 | Fair Park Coliseum | Dallas | 9,552 |
| 1925 | Music Hall at Fair Park | Dallas | 3,420 |
| 1957 | Kay Bailey Hutchison Convention Center | Dallas | 9,810 |
| 1973 | Bruton Center for the Performing Arts | Dallas | 1,730 |
| unknown | Davis Fieldhouse | Dallas | 7,500 |
| 1973 | UNT Coliseum | Denton | 9,797 |
| August 27, 2018 | Bert Ogden Arena | Edinburg | 9,324 |
| March 22, 2017; expanded 2024 | Vackar Stadium | Edinburg | 12,000 |
| February 3, 1977 | Don Haskins Center | El Paso | 11,892 (General); 4,462 (Theater) |
| May 22, 1942 | El Paso County Coliseum | El Paso | 5,250 |
| September 21, 1963 | Sun Bowl Stadium | El Paso | 51,500 |
| 1930; reopened 2006 | Plaza Theatre | El Paso | 2,050 |
| 1973 | Abraham Chavez Theatre | El Paso | 2,500 |
| unknown | Magoffin Auditorium | El Paso | 1,152 |
| 2012 | The Lowbrow Palace | El Paso | 1,500 |
| 2017 | 11:11 | El Paso | 1,200 |
| 2023 | Keith Bell Opportunity Central | Forney | 7,500 |
| September 30, 1968 | Fort Worth Convention Center | Fort Worth | 14,000 |
| November 8, 2019 | Dickies Arena | Fort Worth | 14,000 |
| 1981 | Billy Bob's | Fort Worth | 6,000 |
| unknown | Landreth Auditorium | Fort Worth | 1,200 |
| 1936 | Will Rogers Memorial Center | Fort Worth | 5,856 (Coliseum); 2,856 (Auditorium) |
| unknown | North Crowley Auditorium | Fort Worth | 1,273 |
| 1895 | Grand 1894 Opera House | Galveston | 1,040 |
| 1987 | Moody Gardens Expo Hall | Galveston | 7,000 |
| August 2005 | Curtis Culwell Center | Garland | 8,500 |
| February 2002 | Texas Trust CU Theatre | Grand Prairie | 6,350 |
| 1939 | Greenville Municipal Auditorium | Greenville | 1,400 |
| October 23, 2003 | Payne Arena | Hidalgo | 7,000 |
| May 12, 2012 | BBVA Stadium | Houston | 22,309 |
| 2008 | House of Blues | Houston | 1,500 |
| February 2006 | Warehouse Live | Houston | 1,500 |
| 2007 | The Linda & Archie Dunham Theater | Houston | 1,200 |
| October 6, 2003 | Toyota Center | Houston | 18,300 |
| March 30, 2000 | Daikin Park | Houston | 40,950 |
| September 30, 1950 | Rice Stadium (Rice University) | Houston | 47,000 |
| August 24, 2002 | Reliant Stadium | Houston | 72,220 |
| February 14, 1974 | Reliant Arena | Houston | 8,000 |
| November 14, 1997 | Bayou Music Center | Houston | 3,464 |
| August 29, 2014 | TDECU Stadium | Houston | 40,000 |
| September 26, 1987 | George R. Brown Convention Center | Houston | 7,500 (Exhibit Hall B3); 3,600(General Assembly Theater) |
| 2002 | Hobby Center for the Performing Arts | Houston | 2,650 |
| 1967; renovated 2018 | Fertitta Center | Houston | 8,050 |
| 2021 | 713 Music Hall | Houston | 5,000 (General Admission); 1,950 (Reserved) |
| 1989 | Health and Physical Education Arena | Houston | 8,100 |
| 1976 | Bernard Johnson Coliseum | Huntsville | 6,110 |
| September 1986 | Bowers Stadium | Huntsville | 20,000 (14,000 permanent seats) |
| September 2017 | Toyota Music Factory | Irving | 8,000 (Amphitheater); 4,000 (Concert Hall); 2,500 (Theater) |
| 2004 | Killeen Civic and Convention Center | Killeen | 2,000 (Ballroom); 7,000 (Rodeo Arena) |
| September 21, 2002 | Sames Auto Arena | Laredo | 9,622 (Full house); 6,780 (3/4 house); 4,144 (1/2 house) |
| March 26, 1997 | United Supermarkets Arena | Lubbock | 15,000 |
| Unknown | Lone Star Event Center | Lubbock | 8,000 (Amphitheater); 2,500 (Pavilion) |
| January 6, 2021 | Jones Theater | Lubbock | 2,290 |
| 1977 | Lubbock Memorial Civic Center | Lubbock | 3,861 (Exhibit Hall); 1,377 (Theater) |
| 1983 | Henderson Exposition Center | Lufkin | 10,000 |
| 2007 | Belcher Center | Longview | 2,011 |
| unknown | Maude Cobb Convention Center | Longview | 2,500 |
| 2012 | Vaszauskas Center for the Performing Arts | Mansfield | 5,500 |
| 1977 | Marshall Convention Center Theatre | Marshall | 1,608 |
| 2018 | McAllen Performing Arts Center | McAllen | 1,800 |
| 2007 | McAllen Convention Center | McAllen | 5,600 |
| late 1970s | Payne Auto Group Arena | Mercedes | 8,195 |
| 1986 | Mesquite Arena | Mesquite | 7,000 |
| August 12, 2011 | Wagner Noël Performing Arts Center | Midland | 1,819 |
| 2006 | The Horseshoe Arena | Midland | 4,500 |
| 2016 | The Horseshoe Amphitheater | Midland | 4,300 |
| 1978 | Langford Chaparral Center | Midland | 5,500 |
| 2002 | Astound Broadband Stadium | Midland | 18,000 |
| unknown | La Hacienda Event Center | Midland | 4,500 |
| September 8, 1973 | Homer Bryce Stadium | Nacogdoches | 25,000 |
| unknown | Nacogdoches County Expo Center | Nacogdoches | 7,600 |
| 1954 | Ector County Coliseum | Odessa | 8,000 |
| September 1982 | Ratliff Stadium | Odessa | 19,302 |
| unknown | James Bonham Auditorium | Odessa | 1,296 |
| 1980 | Lutcher Theater | Orange | 1,460 |
| unknown | Bowers Civic Center | Port Arthur | 2,818 |
| August 2023 | Fort Bend County Epicenter | Rosenberg | 10,000 |
| unknown | Hatfield Performing Arts Center | Round Rock | 1,500 |
| unknown | Aylor Memorial River Stage | San Angelo | 8,900 |
| August 29, 1958 | Foster Communications Coliseum | San Angelo | 7,000 |
| 2002 | Stephens Arena | San Angelo | 5,530 |
| 1956 | San Angelo Stadium | San Angelo | 17,500 |
| 1928 | Murphey Performance Hall | San Angelo | 1,370 |
| October 18, 2002 | Frost Bank Center | San Antonio | 18,581 |
| May 15, 1993 | Alamodome | San Antonio | 71,296 |
| June 4, 1926 | Aztec Theatre | San Antonio | 1,477 |
| June 14, 1929; reopened 1989 | Majestic Theatre | San Antonio | 2,264 |
| October 19, 1949 | Freeman Coliseum | San Antonio | 11,700 |
| 2011 | Alamodome Theater | San Antonio | 13,158 |
| 1994 | Laurie Auditorium | San Antonio | 2,709 |
| 1926 (Remodeled 2014) | Tobin Center for the Performing Arts | San Antonio | 1,738 (H-E-B Performance Hall Reserved); 2,100 (H-E-B Performance Hall GA) |
| 1968 | Lila Cockrell Theatre | San Antonio | 2,319 |
| 1937 | Sunken Garden Theatre | San Antonio | 4,800 |
| unknown | Summit Event Center | San Antonio | 2,375 |
| May 2, 2022 | Boeing Center | San Antonio | 3,200 |
| 2000 | Greehey Arena | San Antonio | 4,750 |
| 2001; remodeled 2019 | Real Life Amphitheater | Selma | 20,000 |
| 1982 | Strahan Coliseum | San Marcos | 10,000 |
| 1981 | UFCU Stadium | San Marcos | 36,000 |
| 1930s | Kidd-Key Auditorium | Sherman | 1,300 |
| unknown | Pecan Grove Park West | Sherman | 2,000 |
| 2004 | Stafford Centre | Stafford | 1,155 |
| January 14, 2017 | Smart Financial Centre | Sugar Land | 6,400 (Full house); 3,000 (Half-house) |
| 1924 | Perot Theatre | Texarkana | 1,400 |
| 1985 | Four States Arena | Texarkana | 6,500 |
| April 1990 | Cynthia Woods Mitchell Pavilion | The Woodlands | 16,500 |
| 1983 | The Oil Palace | Tyler | 9,000 |
| unknown | UT Tyler Cowan Center | Tyler | 2,000 |
| unknown | Caldwell Auditorium | Tyler | 1,792 |
| unknown | Patriot Plaza | Tyler | 4,000 (General admission); 2,500 (reserved) |
| 1956 | Moody Coliseum | University Park | 7,950 |
| September 2000 | Gerald R. Ford Stadium | University Park | 32,000 |
| Unknown | Victoria Fine Arts Center | Victoria | 1,481 |
| September 2014 | McLane Stadium | Waco | 45,140 |
| January 2, 2024 | Foster Pavilion | Waco | 7,500 |
| April 11, 1953 | Extraco Coliseum | Waco | 9,000 |
| 2022 | The BASE at Extraco Events Center | Waco | 3,000 |
| May 27, 1930 | Waco Hall | Waco | 2,200 |
| January 3, 2003 | Kay Yeager Coliseum | Wichita Falls | 10,000 |
| 1927 | Wichita Falls Memorial Auditorium | Wichita Falls | 2,700 |
| 1969 | D.L. Ligon Coliseum | Wichita Falls | 4,525 |

=== Utah ===
| Opened | Venue | City | Capacity |
|---|---|---|---|
| October 4, 1991 | Delta Center | Salt Lake City | 20,000 |
| 1927 (reopened 1998) | Rice-Eccles Stadium | Salt Lake City | 51,444 |
| 1969 | Huntsman Center | Salt Lake City | 15,000 |
| 1979 | Abravanel Hall | Salt Lake City | 2,768 |
| 2016 | Delta Performance Hall | Salt Lake City | 2,468 |
| 1930 | Kingsbury Hall | Salt Lake City | 1,992 |
| 2006 | The Depot | Salt Lake City | 1,200 |
| 2010 | The Complex | Salt Lake City | 2,500 |
| unknown | Union Event Center | Salt Lake City | 3,000 |
| February 2004 | Delta Theater | Salt Lake City | 4,500 |
| March 22, 1996 | Maverik Center | West Valley City | 12,600 (Arena); 3,700 (Theater) |
| 2003 | Utah First Credit Union Amphitheatre | West Valley City | 20,000 |
| unknown | Salt Lake County Equestrian Center | Sandy | 7,800 |
| unknown | Alta Auditorium | Sandy | 1,500 |
| 1999 | Sandy Amphitheater | Sandy | 2,700 |
| October 9, 2008 | America First Field | Sandy | 25,000 |
| 1960 | Clearfield Auditorium | Clearfield | 1,700 |
| unknown | Legacy Events Center | Farmington | 6,040 |
| 2018 | Farmington Auditorium | Farmington | 1,221 |
| unknown | Golden Spike Arena | Harrisville | 7,869 |
| September 2019 | Mountain Ridge Auditorium | Herriman | 1,275 |
| 2004 | Davis Auditorium | Kaysville | 1,188 |
| 1992 | Northridge Auditorium | Layton | 1,527 |
| 1962 | Hillcrest Auditorium | Midvale | 1,800 |
| Unknown | Syracuse Auditorium | Syracuse | 1,141 |
| 1995 | Copper Hills Auditorium | West Jordan | 1,250 |
| Unknown | WXHS Auditorium | Woods Cross | 1,530 |
| December 1, 1970 | Dee Glen Smith Spectrum | Logan | 11,250 |
| 1967; | Daines Concert Hall | Logan | 1,700 |
| March 29, 1923 | Ellen Eccles Theatre | Logan | 1,100 |
| 1950s | Stewart Stadium | Ogden | 25,000 |
| November 1, 1977 | Dee Events Center | Ogden | 12,950 |
| unknown | Austad Auditorium | Ogden | 1,407 |
| unknown | Ogden Amphitheater | Ogden | 7,573 |
| October 2, 1964 | LaVell Edwards Stadium | Provo | 63,470 |
| 1998 | Dixie Center | St. George | 6,785 |
| 1986 | Burns Arena | St. George | 5,776 |
| unknown | Cox Performing Arts Center | St. George | 1,189 |
| 1985 | Greater Zion Stadium | St. George | 17,000 |
| unknown | Legacy Park | Hurricane | 4,500 |
| 1971 | Marriott Center | Provo | 19,000 |
| 1996 | UCCU Center | Orem | 8,500 |
| 1985 | America First Credit Union Event Center | Cedar City | 5,300 |
| April 1995 | Tuacahn Center | Ivins | 1,920 |
| 1981 | The Great Saltair | Magna | 4,600 |
| unknown | Deseret Peak Complex | Tooele | 4,816 (Indoor arena); 4,500(Outdoor Arena) |

=== Vermont ===
| Opened | Venue | City | Capacity |
|---|---|---|---|
| 1963 | Patrick Gym | Burlington | 4,188 |
| 1930; restored 2010 | Flynn Center for the Performing Arts | Burlington | 1,411 |
| unknown | Waterfront Park | Burlington | 5,000 |
| 1939 | Barre Auditorium | Barre | 1,650 |
| 2000 | Champlain Valley Expo Grandstand | Essex Junction | 10,000 |
| 1973 | Ross Sports Center | Colchester | 3,000 |
| 1998 | Kreitzberg Arena | Northfield | 5,000 |

=== Virginia ===
| Opened | Venue | City | Capacity |
|---|---|---|---|
| November 14, 2024 | Hard Rock Live Bristol | Bristol | 2,000 |
| 2006 | John Paul Jones Arena | Charlottesville | 14,593 (Arena); 2,500 (Theater) |
| 2010s | Ting Pavilion | Charlottesville | 3,500 |
| 1984 | Martin Luther King Jr. Performing Arts Center | Charlottesville | 1,276 |
| August 2021 | Carrington Pavilion | Danville | 5,100 |
| 1998 | Grant Center | Danville | 3,450 |
| unknown | Danville City Auditorium | Danville | 1,499 |
| late 2024 | Caesars Virginia Event Center | Danville | 2,500 |
| unknown | Olde Dominion Agricultural Complex Arena | Chatham | 3,000 |
| October 4, 1985 | EagleBank Arena | Fairfax | 10,000 |
| unknown | Hylton Performing Arts Center | Fairfax | 1,128 |
| unknown | Fredericksburg Expo and Conference Center | Fredericksburg | 3,400 |
| 1940 (Remodeled 2005) | Dodd Auditorium | Fredericksburg | 1,237 |
| 2009 | Anderson Center | Fredericksburg | 3,000 |
| unknown | Patriot Park Amphitheater | Fredericksburg | 2,000 |
| November 25, 2020 | Atlantic Union Bank Center | Harrisonburg | 9,450 |
| 1975; expanded 1981 and 2011 | Bridgeforth Stadium | Harrisonburg | 24,877 |
| May 13, 1931 | Woodrow Wilson Hall | Harrisonburg | 1,233 |
| 2023 | Henrico Sports & Events Center | Henrico | 3,500 |
| 2019 | ION International Training Center | Leesburg | 5,500 |
| unknown | Glass Civic Auditorium | Lynchburg | 2,044 |
| September 1989 | Williams Stadium | Lynchburg | 34,500 |
| 1990 | Vines Center | Lynchburg | 9,200 |
| unknown (Renovated 2024-26) | Riverfront Park Amphitheater | Lynchburg | 3,500 (Reserved); 5,000 (General Admission) |
| unknown | School of Music Performance Hall | Lynchburg | 1,283 |
| 2005 | Ferguson Center for the Arts | Newport News | 1,725 (Diamonstein Concert Hall) |
| 2001 | Atlantic Union Bank Pavilion | Portsmouth | 6,500 |
| June 1995 | Jiffy Lube Live | Bristow | 25,262 |
| 1970 | Hampton Coliseum | Hampton | 9,777 |
| 1992 | Hampton Convocation Center | Hampton | 8,200 |
| November 12, 1971 | Norfolk Scope | Norfolk | 12,600 (Arena); 4,000 (Prism Theatre) |
| 1972 | Chrysler Hall | Norfolk | 2,500 |
| 1917 | The NorVa | Norfolk | 1,500 |
| October 25, 2002 | Chartway Arena | Norfolk | 9,100 (Full arena); 4,134 (Half-house); 2,755 (Theater) |
| September 1997 | Dick Price Stadium | Norfolk | 39,000 |
| April 1993 | Harbor Park | Norfolk | 15,000 |
| 1943; remodeled 1993 | Harrison Opera House | Norfolk | 1,632 |
| 1996 | Wilder Performing Arts Center | Norfolk | 1,500 |
| 1971 | Kaplan Arena | Williamsburg | 11,300 |
| 1923 | National Theater | Richmond | 1,500 |
| August 21, 1971 | Richmond Coliseum | Richmond | 11,992 |
| 1927 | Altria Theater | Richmond | 3,565 |
| 1991 | Virginia Credit Union Live! | Richmond | 6,000 |
| 1972 | Robins Center | Richmond | 8,161 |
| May 1, 1999 | Siegel Center | Richmond | 7,500 |
| 1928 (restored 2009) | Carpenter Theatre | Richmond | 1,800 |
| 2025 | Allianz Amphitheater | Richmond | 7,500 |
| 1971 | Berglund Center | Roanoke | 10,600 (Coliseum); 4,276 (Eclipse); 2,151 (Performing Arts Center) |
| 2014 | Elmwood Park Amphitheater | Roanoke | 4,000 |
| October 1967 | Salem Civic Center | Salem | 7,000 |
| 1936 | Burruss Auditorium | Blacksburg | 3,003 |
| 1981 | Dedmon Center | Radford | 4,150 (3,200 permanent and retractable seats) |
| unknown | Ken Bondurant Auditorium | Radford | 1,500 |
| unknown | Augusta Expo Event Center | Fishersville | 1,600 |
| 2021 | Capital One Hall | Tysons | 1,600 |
| July 1, 1971 | Filene Center | Vienna | 7,024 |
| 1996 | Veterans United Home Loans Amphitheater | Virginia Beach | 20,000 |
| 1957; restored 2025 | The Dome | Virginia Beach | 2,407 (Reserved); 3,500 (General Admission); 5,000 (Amphitheater) |
| January 3, 2007 | Sandler Center for the Performing Arts | Virginia Beach | 1,308 |
| 2020 | Virginia Beach Sports Center | Virginia Beach | 5,000 |
| January 2018 | Wilkins Athletic Center | Winchester | 4,972 |
| 2011 | David J. Prior Convocation Center | Wise | 3,600 |

=== Washington ===
| Opened | Venue | City | Capacity |
|---|---|---|---|
| 1982 | Grays Harbor Fair and Events Center Pavilion | Elma | 3,750 |
| 1938 | Olympic Stadium | Hoquiam | up to 10,000 (7,500 permanent seats) |
| April 29, 1927 | Mount Baker Theatre | Bellingham | 1,509 |
| April 21, 1983 | Tacoma Dome | Tacoma | 23,000 |
| January 1918 | Pantages Theater | Tacoma | 1,170 |
| unknown | Grant County Fairgrounds | Moses Lake | 5,000 (Rodeo Arena); 3,336 (Ardell Pavilion) |
| 1986 | The Gorge Amphitheatre | George | 27,500 |
| 2007 | Kitsap Sun Pavilion | Bremerton | 8,676 (General Admission); 4,384 (Reserved) |
| 1988 | Bremerton Performing Arts Center | Bremerton | 1,200 |
| January 2, 2009 | Accesso ShoWare Center | Kent | 6,500 |
| July 28, 2002 | Lumen Field | Seattle | 68,740 |
| July 15, 1999 | T-Mobile Park | Seattle | 47,116 |
| April 21, 1962 | Climate Pledge Arena | Seattle | 17,459 |
| 2006 | WaMu Theater | Seattle | 7,200 (General Admission); 4,700 (Reserved) |
| 1928 | McCaw Hall | Seattle | 2,963 |
| March 1928 | Paramount Theatre | Seattle | 2,807 |
| September 1998 | Benaroya Hall | Seattle | 2,500 |
| September 24, 1926 | 5th Avenue Theatre | Seattle | 2,130 |
| 2007 | Showbox SoDo | Seattle | 1,500 |
| 1907 | Moore Theatre | Seattle | 1,400 |
| 1909 | Meany Hall for the Performing Arts | Seattle | 1,206 |
| July 24, 1939 | The Showbox | Seattle | 1,150 |
| unknown | Marymoor Park | Redmond | 5,000 |
| September 27, 2003 | Angel of the Winds Arena | Everett | 10,000 |
| unknown | Everett Civic Auditorium | Everett | 1,534 |
| June 14, 2003 | White River Amphitheatre | Auburn | 16,000 |
| November 19, 1988 | Toyota Center | Kennewick | 7,200 (End/Center stage); 4,039 (3/4 house); 3,281 (half-house); 2,081 (Retter and Co. Theater) |
| unknown | Art Fuller Auditorium | Kennewick | 1,100 |
| 1995 | The HAPO Center | Pasco | 5,000 (Arena) |
| 2003 | Cascades Amphitheater | Ridgefield | 18,000 |
| September 12, 2006 | Town Toyota Center | Wenatchee | 5,800 (Arena); 2,300 (Theater) |
| 1959 | Port Angeles Performing Arts Center | Port Angeles | 1,152 |
| February 8, 1971 | Beasley Coliseum | Pullman | 12,500 (Friel Court); 4,700 (Mini-Arena); 2,500 (Theater) |
| 2013 | Silver Reef Casino Event Center | Ferndale | 1,000 |
| March 5, 1993 | Numerica Veterans Arena | Spokane | 11,736 (Full Arena); 8,039 (3/4 House); 5,519 (Star Theatre) |
| November 19, 2004 | McCarthey Athletic Center | Spokane | 6,000 |
| May 1, 1974 | First Interstate Center for the Arts | Spokane | 2,700 |
| September 3, 1931 | Martin Woldson Theater at The Fox | Spokane | 1,715 |
| 2008 | Knitting Factory Spokane | Spokane | 1,500 |
| 1974 | Spokane Pavilion | Spokane | 5,000 |
| September 1963 | Ferris Auditorium | Spokane | 1,050 |
| 1990 | Yakima SunDome | Yakima | 7,886 (End stage); 7,184 (Center stage); 3,361 (Half-Dome/Theatre) |
| 1920 | Capitol Theatre | Yakima | 1,500 |
| 1962 | Eisenhower Gymnasium | Yakima | 3,500 |
| 2025 | Wine Country Amphitheater | Walla Walla | 5,000 |
| unknown | Cordiner Hall | Walla Walla | 1,378 |
| unknown | Walla Walla County Fair Expo Building | Walla Walla | 3,600 |
| 1991 | Constantino Recreation Center | Olympia | 2,950 |
| 1924 | Capitol Theater | Olympia | 1,500 |
| November 1967 | Marcus Pavilion | Lacey | 3,200 (End stage); 4,500 (Center stage) |
| unknown | Skookum Creek Event Center | Shelton | 1,800 |

=== West Virginia ===
| Opened | Venue | City | Capacity |
|---|---|---|---|
| 1928 | Capitol Theatre | Wheeling | 2,400 |
| April 19, 1977 | WesBanco Arena | Wheeling | 9,300 |
| 1980 | Charleston Coliseum | Charleston | 13,500 |
| 1939 | Charleston Municipal Auditorium | Charleston | 3,483 |
| July 12, 2003 | Clay Center | Charleston | 1,850 |
| 1979 | University of Charleston Stadium at Laidley Field | Charleston | 27,000 |
| 2009 | Clarksburg Amphitheatre | Clarksburg | 2,000 |
| May 7, 1928 | Keith-Albee Theatre | Huntington | 2,417 |
| 1977 | Mountain Health Arena | Huntington | 7,500 |
| December 1, 1970 | Hope Coliseum | Morgantown | 14,000 |
| unknown | Ruby Amphitheatre | Morgantown | 1,500 |
| September 6, 1980 | Milan Puskar Stadium | Morgantown | 60,000 |
| 1969 | Canady Creative Arts Center | Morgantown | 1,440 (Clay Concert Theatre) |
| May 20, 2006 | Mountain Lakes Amphitheater | Flatwoods | 1,700 |
| 1961 | King Coal Beckley Automall Arena | Beckley | 3,856 |
| 1988 | Raleigh County Public Schools Auditorium | Beckley | 1,101 |

=== Wisconsin ===
| Opened | Venue | City | Capacity |
|---|---|---|---|
| April 2001 | American Family Field | Milwaukee | 41,900 |
| September 4, 2018 | Fiserv Forum | Milwaukee | 17,500 |
| July 2, 1927 | Oriental Theatre | Milwaukee | 1,530 |
| 1987 | American Family Insurance Amphitheater | Milwaukee | 23,000 |
| 1950 | Milwaukee Panther Arena | Milwaukee | 12,700 |
| February 2026 | Landmark Credit Union Live | Milwaukee | 4,500 (General Admission); 2,273 (Reserved) |
| 1909 | Miller High Life Theatre | Milwaukee | 4,086 |
| July 26, 1969 | Marcus Performing Arts Center | Milwaukee | 2,125 (Uihlein Hall); 498 (Todd Wehr Theater) |
| 1928 | Riverside Theater | Milwaukee | 2,450 |
| 1927 | Eagles Ballroom | Milwaukee | 1,500 |
| 1895 | Pabst Theater | Milwaukee | 1,339 |
| unknown | Cooley Theatre | Milwaukee | 1,800 |
| unknown | BMO Pavilion | Milwaukee | 5,000 |
| unknown | Varsity Theater | Milwaukee | 1,075 |
| 1987 | Chippewa Valley Festival Grounds | Cadott | ~80,000 |
| 1970s | Festival Hall | Racine | 1,500 |
| unknown | Shattuck Auditorium | Waukesha | 1,152 |
| 1903 | Milwaukee Mile | West Allis | 34,489 |
| unknown | WBMI Pavilion | West Bend | 2,000 |
| unknown | Ziegler Family Expo Center | West Bend | 2,000 |
| 1977 | Alpine Valley Music Theatre | East Troy | 37,000 |
| 1980 | La Crosse Center | La Crosse | 7,500 |
| 2020 | Riverside Park | La Crosse | 2,000 |
| 1965 | Mitchell Hall | La Crosse | 3,500 |
| 1971 | Viterbo Fine Arts Center | La Crosse | 1,200 |
| January 17, 1998 | Kohl Center | Madison | 17,230 |
| 1967 | Alliant Energy Center | Madison | 10,230 (GA); 9,887 (Reserved); 5,500 (3/4 House); 4,267 (Theater); 3,121 (Floor shows) |
| 1927 | Orpheum Theater | Madison | 1,697 |
| September 17, 2004 | Overture Hall | Madison | 2,255 |
| 1928; restored 2005 | Capitol Theatre | Madison | 1,089 |
| unknown | Shannon Hall | Madison | 1,165 |
| September 1917 (Expanded 1951, 1966 and 2002; renovated 1994 and 2022) | Camp Randall Stadium | Madison | 76,051 |
| 2010 | Sun Prairie East Performing Arts Center | Sun Prairie | 1,044 |
| unknown | Verona Performing Arts Center | Verona | 1,013 |
| 1957 | Lambeau Field | Green Bay | 81,441 |
| 2002 | Resch Center | Green Bay | 10,500 (Arena); 5,000 (Theater) |
| February 14, 1930 | Meyer Theatre | Green Bay | 1,011 |
| 1993 | Weidner Center | Green Bay | 2,021 |
| 2021 | Resch Expo Center | Green Bay | 13,875 (full hall); 4,271 (Hall C General admission); 2,768 (Hall C reserved) |
| unknown | Epic Events Center | Green Bay | 2,100 |
| December 1, 2017 | Oshkosh Arena | Oshkosh | 4,200 |
| May 26, 2005 | Leach Amphitheater | Oshkosh | 7,500 |
| unknown | Sunnyview Exposition Center | Oshkosh | 30,000 (Sunnyview Stadium); 5,700 (Sunnyview Arena) |
| unknown | Alberta Kimball Auditorium | Oshkosh | 1,451 |
| November 25, 2002 | Fox Cities Performing Arts Center | Appleton | 2,100 (Thrivent Hall); 450 (Kimberly-Clark Theater) |
| June 16, 1921 | Capitol Civic Centre | Manitowoc | 1,003 |
| July 15, 2024 | Sonnentag Event Center | Eau Claire | 5,000 |
| September 22, 2018 | Pablo Center at the Confluence | Eau Claire | 1,200 |
| unknown | The Pines Music Park | Eau Claire | 5,000 |
| 1957 | Memorial Auditorium | Eau Claire | 1,475 |
| 1981; expanded 2011 | Somerset Amphitheater | Somerset | 40,000 (Amphitheater); 10,000(The Grove) |
| 1954 | Craig Auditorium | Janesville | 1,450 |
| 1954 | Craig Fieldhouse | Janesville | 3,350 |
| 1968 | Parker Fieldhouse | Janesville | 3,350 |
| 1971 | Quandt Fieldhouse | Stevens Point | 3,500 |
| unknown | Marathon Park Amphitheater | Wausau | 8,220 |
| 1927 | Grand Theater | Wausau | 1,200 |
| 1968 | Marshfield Fieldhouse | Marshfield | 3,400 |
| unknown | Young Auditorium | Whitewater | 1,300 |

=== Wyoming ===
| Opened | Venue | City | Capacity |
|---|---|---|---|
| 1982 | Ford Wyoming Center | Casper | 9,700 |
| 1991 | Cheyenne Frontier Days Arena | Cheyenne | 19,000 |
| 1981 | Cheyenne Civic Center | Cheyenne | 1,491 |
| 2019 | Laramie County Events Center | Cheyenne | 2,164 |
| unknown | LCCC Arena | Cheyenne | 3,000 |

== United States Territories ==
| Opened | Venue | City | Capacity |
Guam
| Unknown | Governor Joseph F. Flores Memorial Park | Tamuning | 15,000 |
Puerto Rico
| 1974 | Juan Ramón Loubriel Stadium | Bayamon | 38,000 |
| September 4, 2004 | Coliseo de Puerto Rico | San Juan | 18,000 |
| 1963 | Hiram Bithorn Stadium | San Juan | 40,000 |
| August 14, 2021 | Coca-Cola Music Hall | San Juan | 5,000 |
| February 2, 1973 | Roberto Clemente Coliseum | San Juan | 10,000 |
| April 9, 1981 | Luis A. Ferré Performing Arts Center | San Juan | 1,945 |
| | Anfiteatro Tito Puente | San Juan | 3,000 |
Virgin Islands
| Unknown | Lionel Roberts Stadium | Charlotte Amalie | 9,000 |
District of Columbia
| 1997 | Capital One Arena | Washington, D.C. | 20,356 |
| 2012 | Echostage | Washington, D.C. | 3,000 |
| 1950 | Carter Barron Amphitheatre | Washington, D.C. | 4,200 |
| 1929 | DAR Constitution Hall | Washington, D.C. | 3,702 |
| October 12, 2017 | The Anthem | Washington, D.C. | 6,000 (General Admission); 3,200 (Reserved) |
| 1924 | Warner Theatre | Washington, D.C. | 1,847 |
| 1923 | National Theatre | Washington, D.C. | 1,676 |
| 1922 | Lincoln Theatre | Washington, D.C. | 1,225 |
| 1980 | 9:30 Club | Washington, D.C. | 1,200 |
| 1910 | Howard Theatre | Washington, D.C. | 1,000 |
| January 23, 1988 | Bender Arena | Washington, D.C. | 6,000 |
| September 1971 | Kennedy Performing Arts Center | Washington, D.C. | 2,465 (Concert Hall); 2,347 (Opera House); 1,161 (Eisenhower Theatre) |
| 1946 | Lisner Auditorium | Washington, D.C. | 1,500 |
| 1941 | D.C. Armory | Washington, D.C. | 10,000 |
| 2008 | Nationals Park | Washington, D.C. | 41,888 |
| November 17, 1975 | Charles E. Smith Center | Washington, D.C. | 5,000 |
| 1917 | National Sylvan Theater | Washington, D.C. | 10,000 |
| 1959 | Cramton Auditorium | Washington, D.C. | 1,500 |

== Defunct ==
| Years active | Venue | City | Capacity |
California
| 1959-2016 | Los Angeles Memorial Sports Arena | Los Angeles | 16,740 |
| 1949-1981 | Swing Auditorium | San Bernardino | 10,000 |
| 1972-2013 | Universal Amphitheatre | Universal City | 6,189 |
Colorado
| 1979-1989 | Rainbow Music Hall | Denver | 1,485 |
Florida
| 1989-2010 | Amway Arena | Orlando | 17,283 |
| 1988-2008 | Miami Arena | Miami | 15,200 |
Indiana
| 1974-1999 | Market Square Arena | Indianapolis | 16,530 |
Michigan
| 1988-2017 | The Palace of Auburn Hills | Auburn Hills | 24,000 |
| 1979-2017 | Joe Louis Arena | Detroit | 21,000 |
Minnesota
| 1973-1998 | St. Paul Civic Center | St. Paul | 16,000 |
Missouri
| 1929-1994 | St. Louis Arena | St. Louis | 20,000 |
New Jersey
| 1981 | Izod Center | East Rutherford | 20,049 |
New Mexico
| 1957-1986 | Albuquerque Civic Auditorium | Albuquerque | 6,000 |
Ohio
| 1964-2016 | Hara Arena | Dayton | 7,000 |
| 1947-2007 | Toledo Sports Arena | Toledo | 6,500 (Full Arena); 4,400 (Half House) |
Pennsylvania
| 1926-1989 | John F. Kennedy Stadium | Philadelphia | 102,000 |
| 1971-2003 | Veterans Stadium | Philadelphia | 65,352 |
| 1967-2009 | Spectrum | Philadelphia | 19,456 |
| | Virginia | | |
| 1960s-1994 | Peppermint Beach Club | Virginia Beach | 1,000 |
Wisconsin
| 1958-2019 | Brown County Veterans Memorial Arena | Green Bay | 5,248 |

== Gallery ==
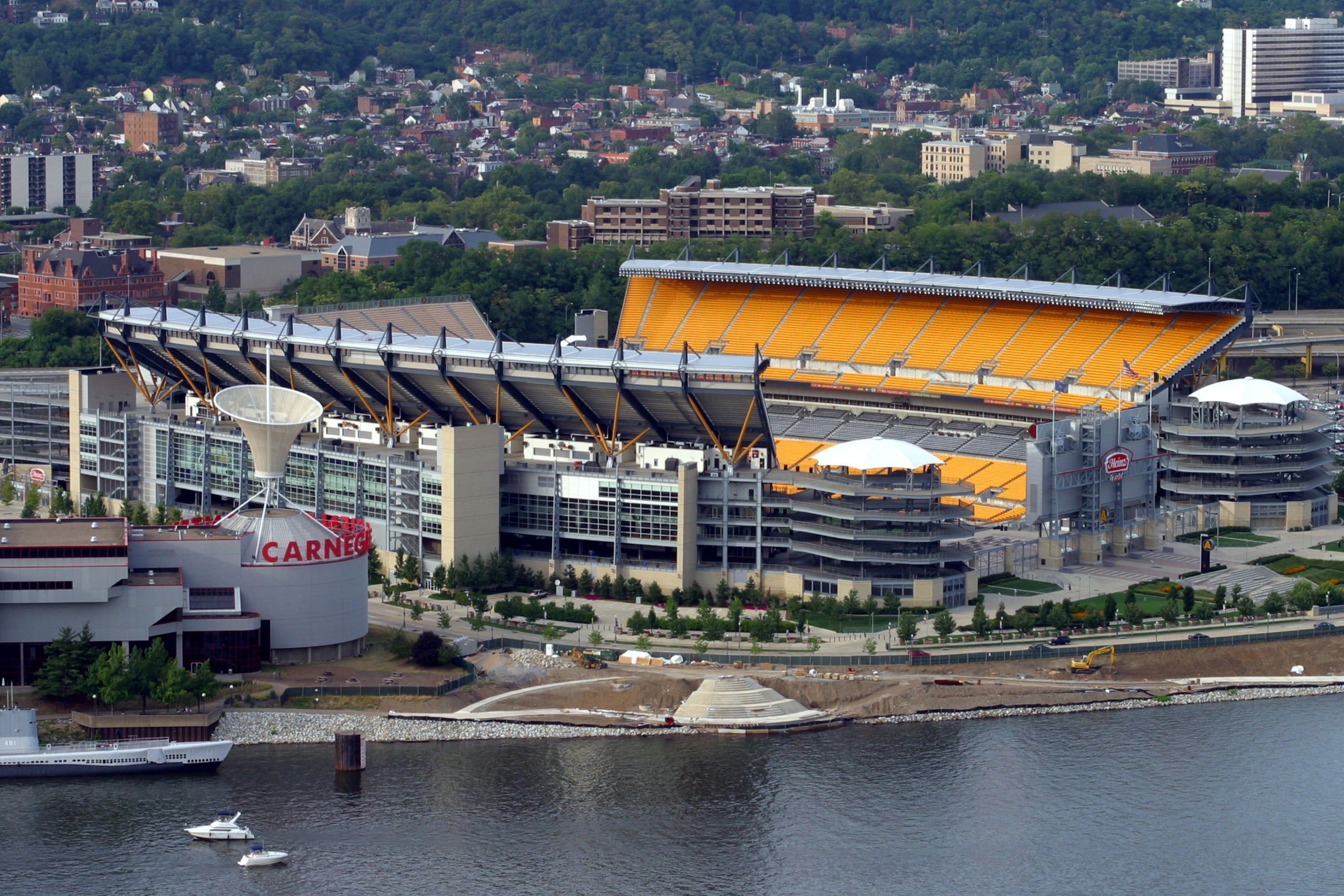
Acrisure Stadium

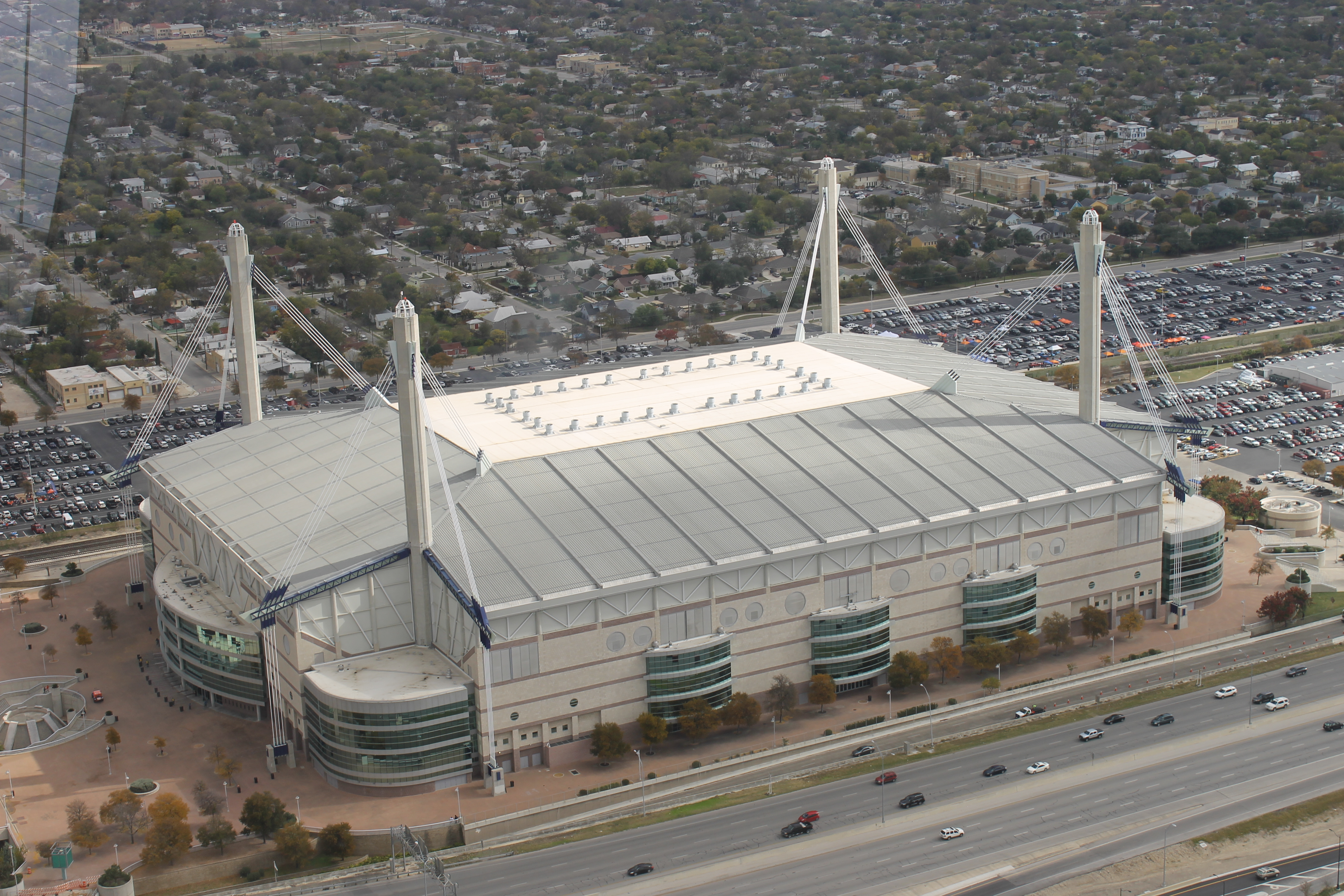
Alamodome

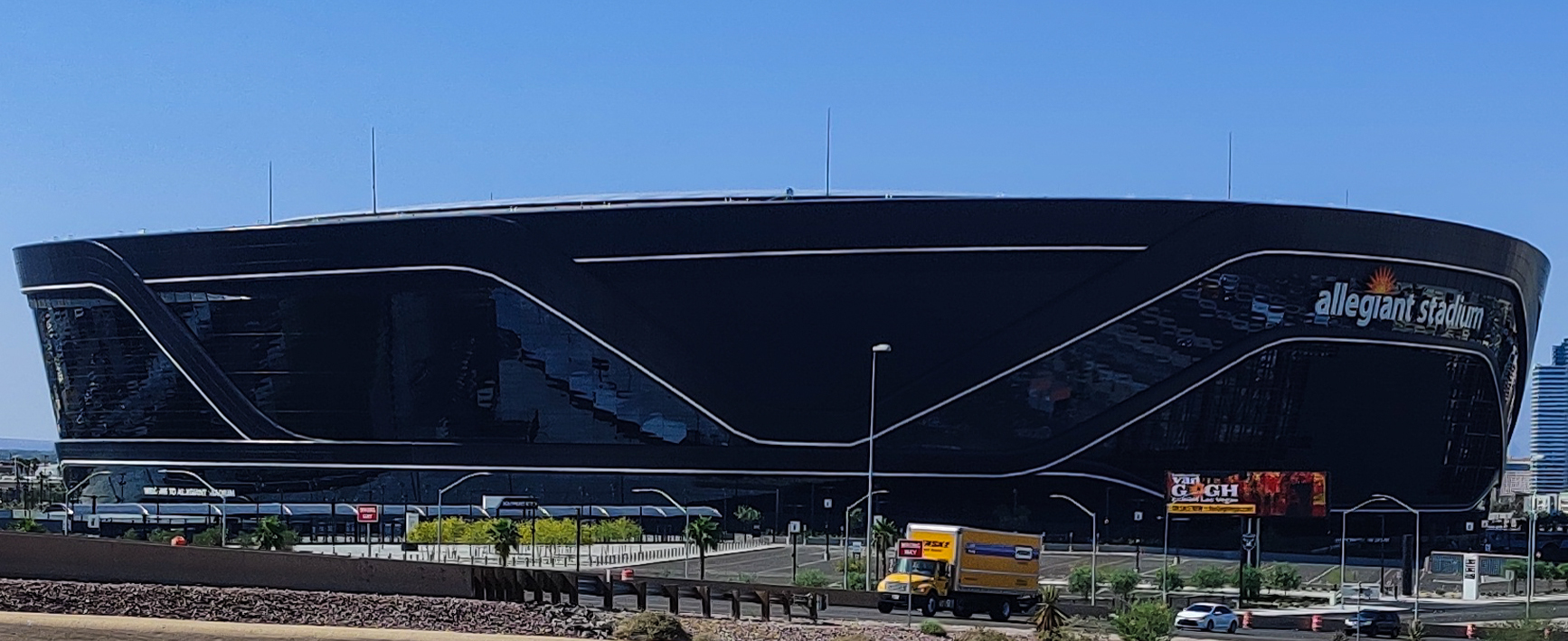
Allegiant Stadium

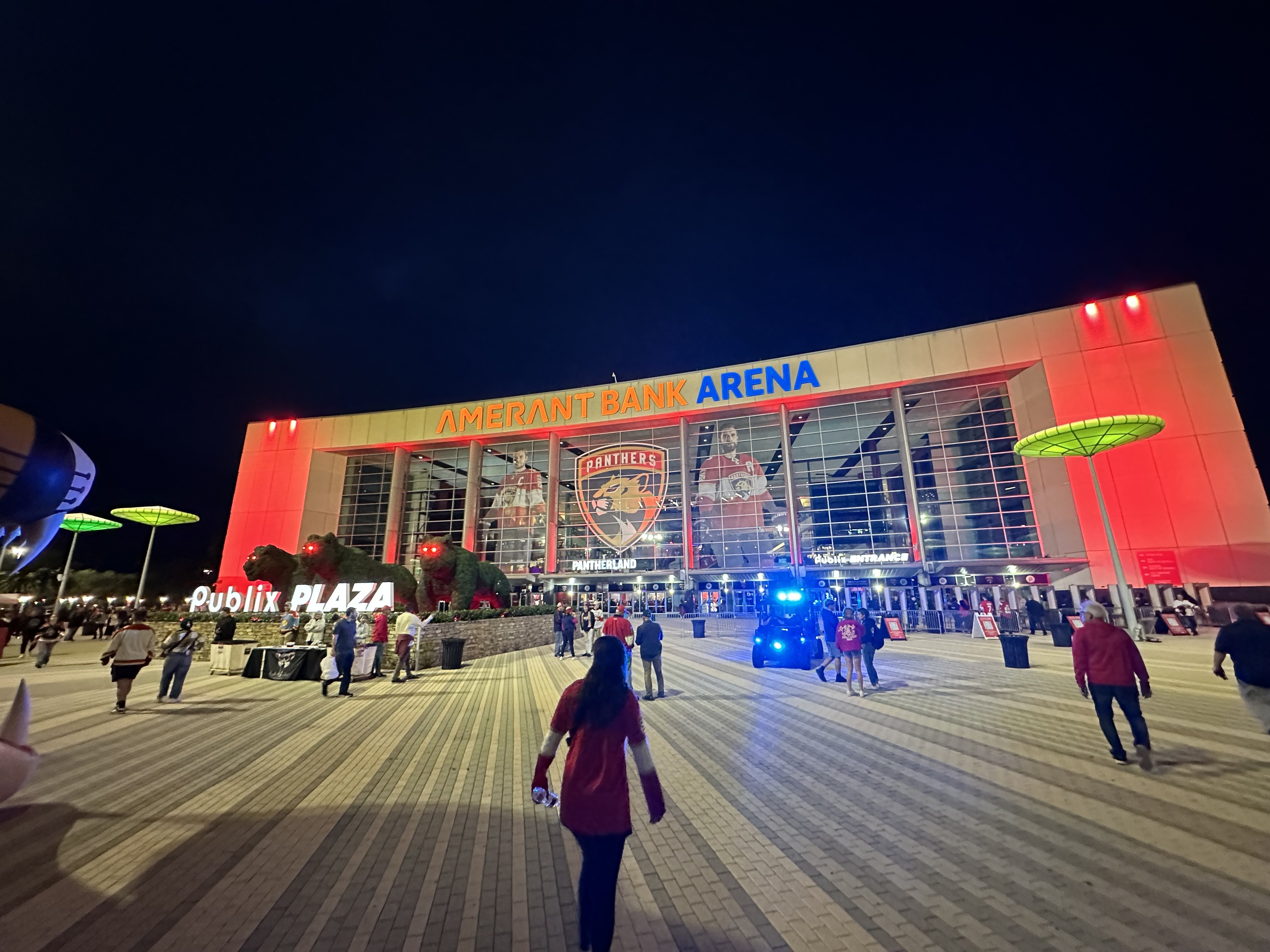
Amerant Bank Arena

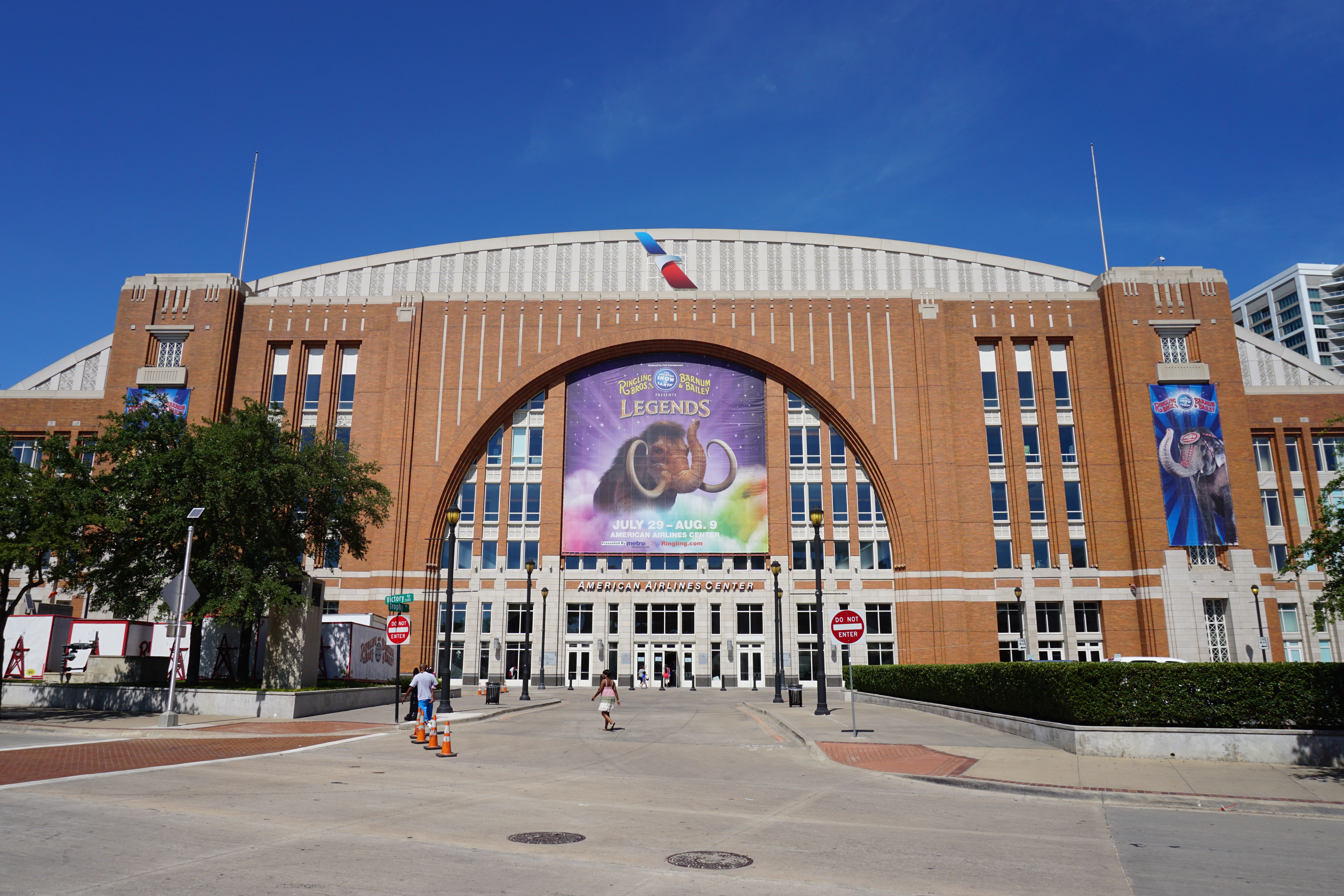
American Airlines Center

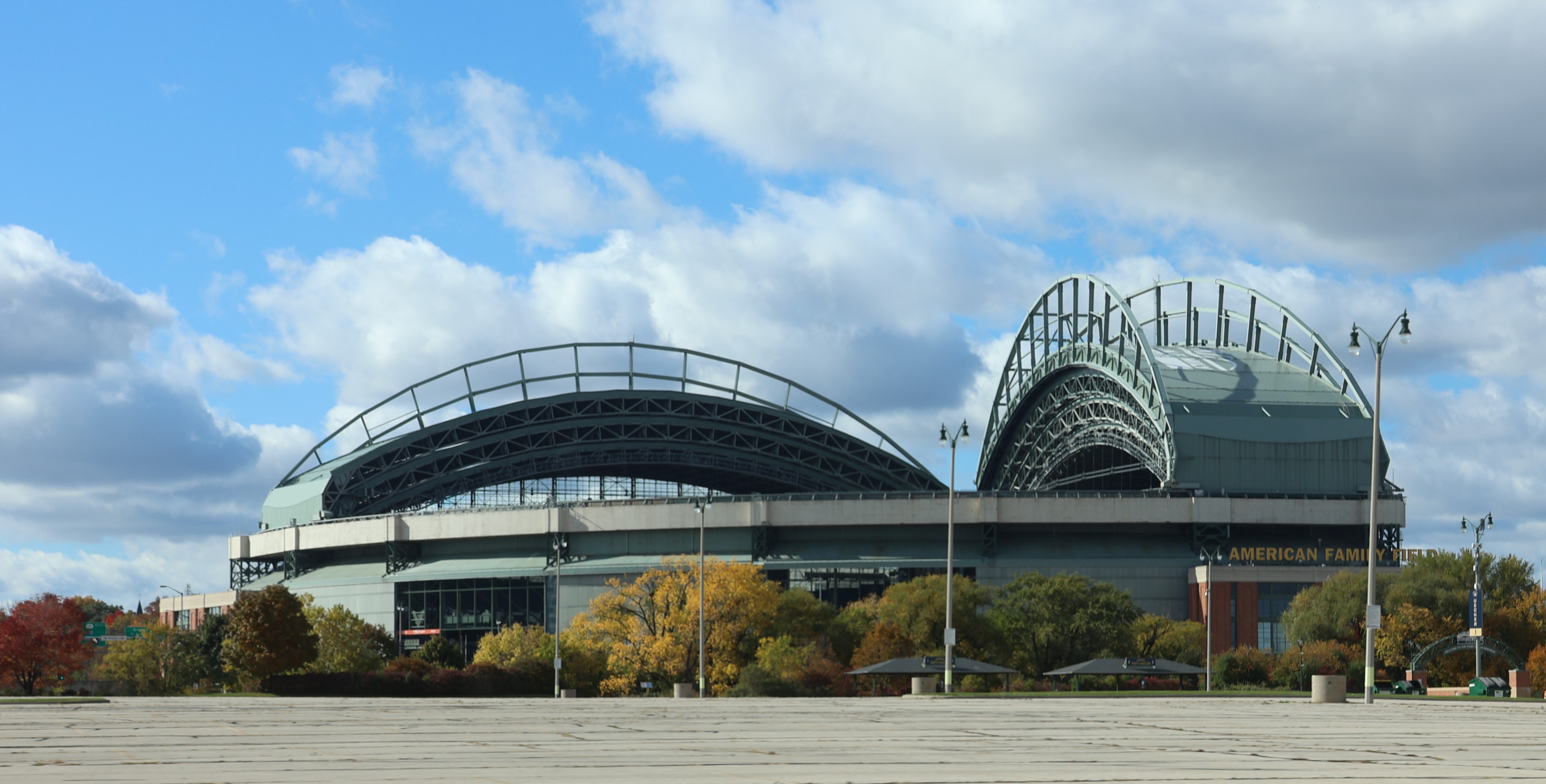
American Family Field

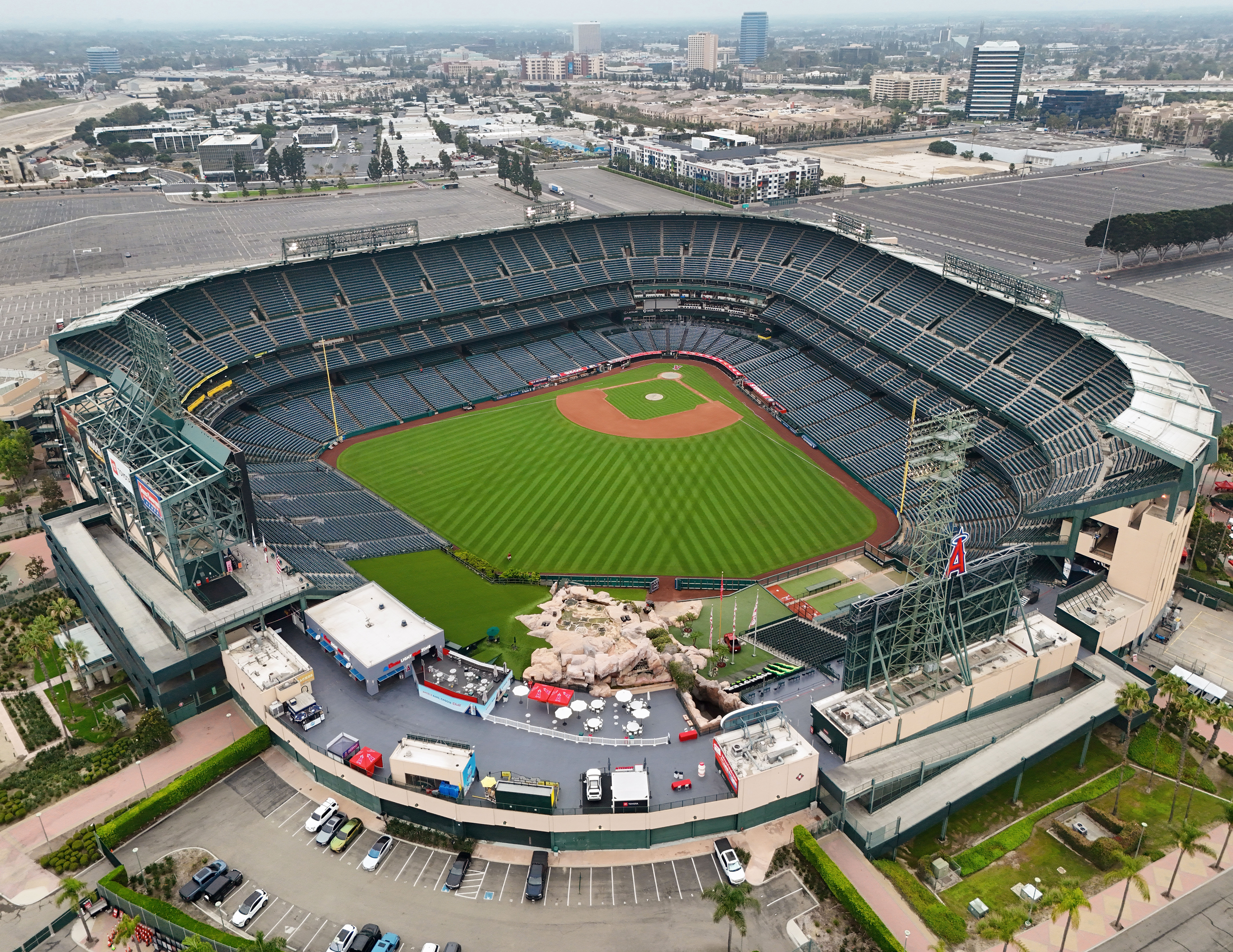
Angel Stadium

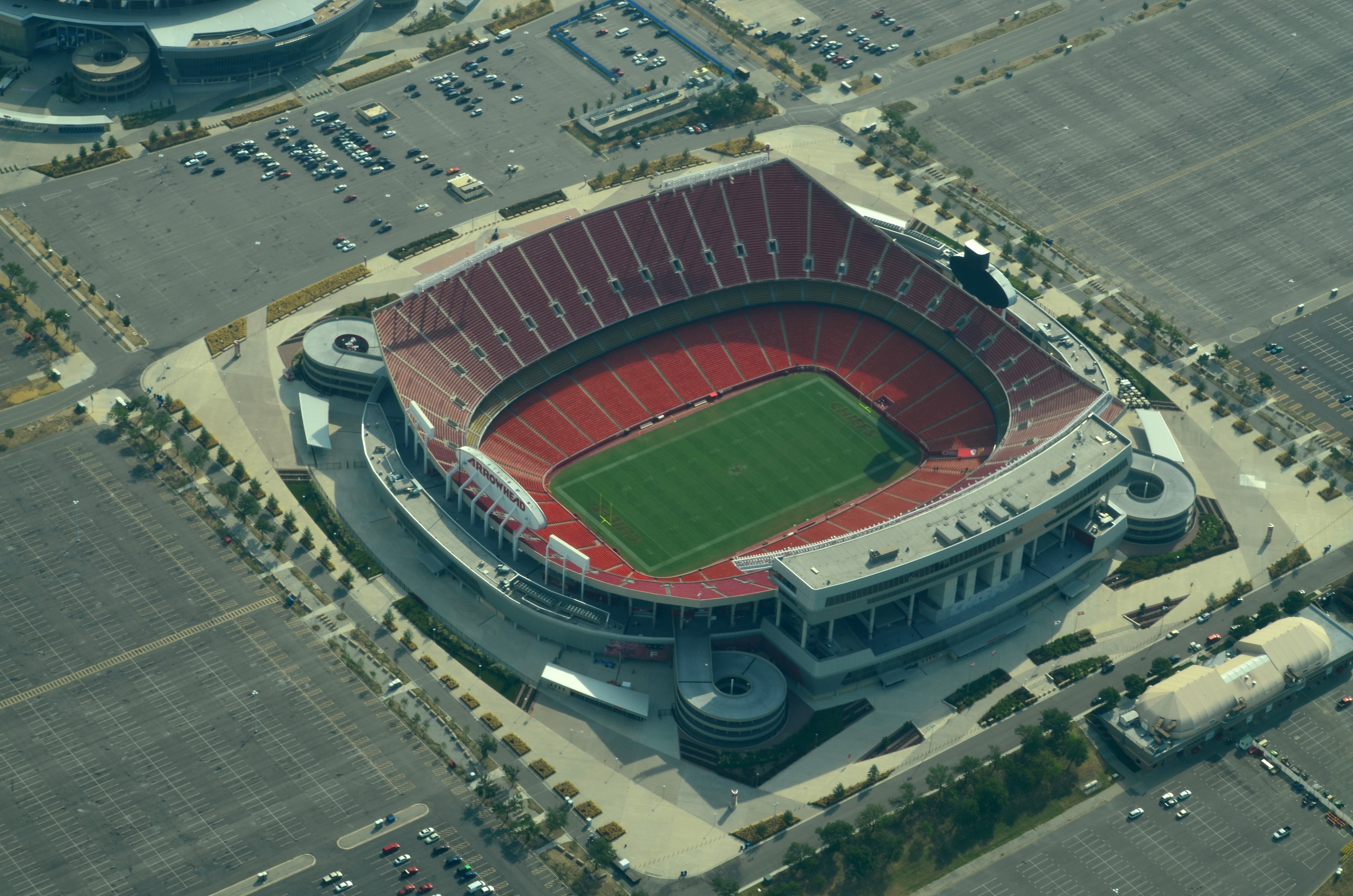
Arrowhead Stadium

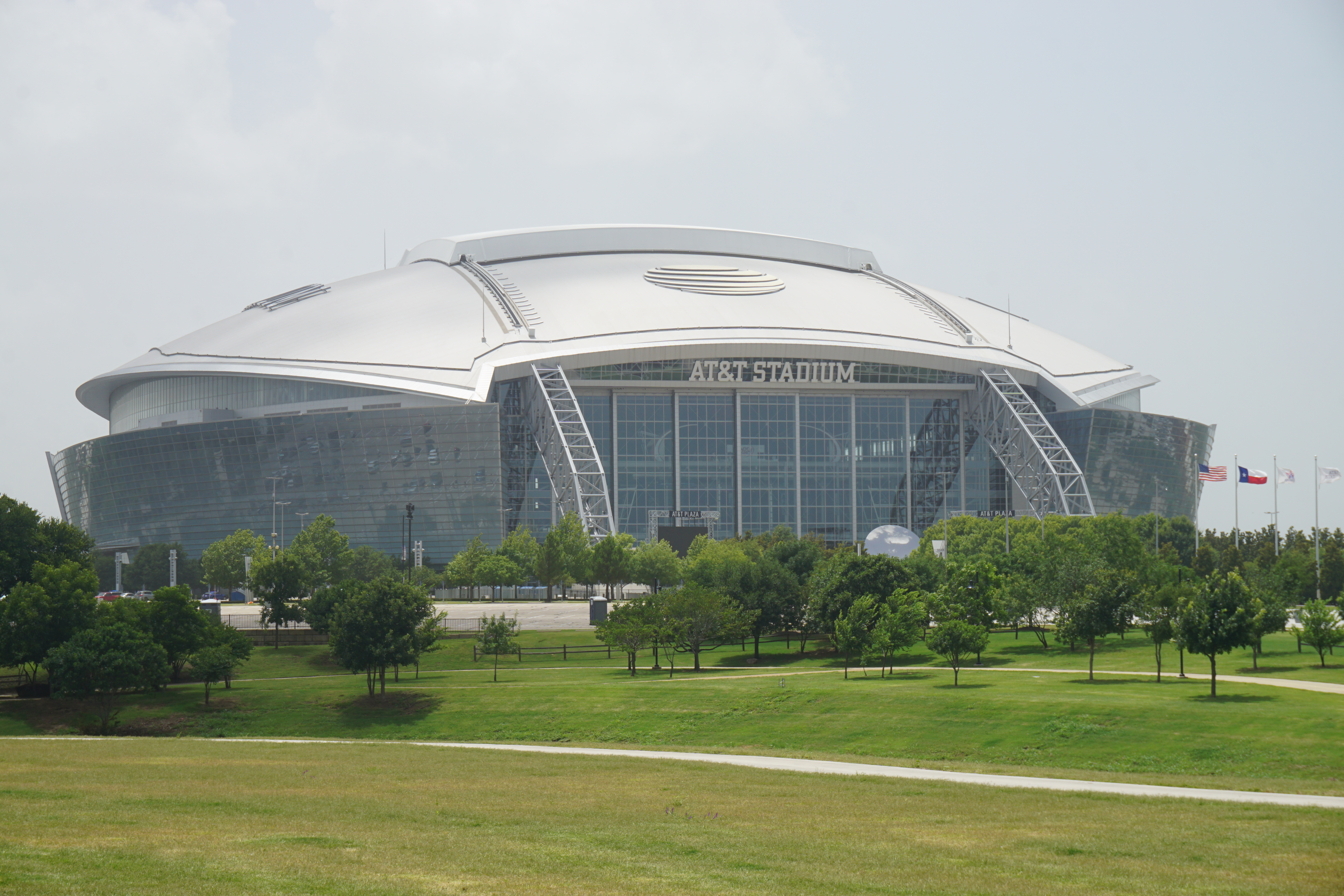
AT&T Stadium

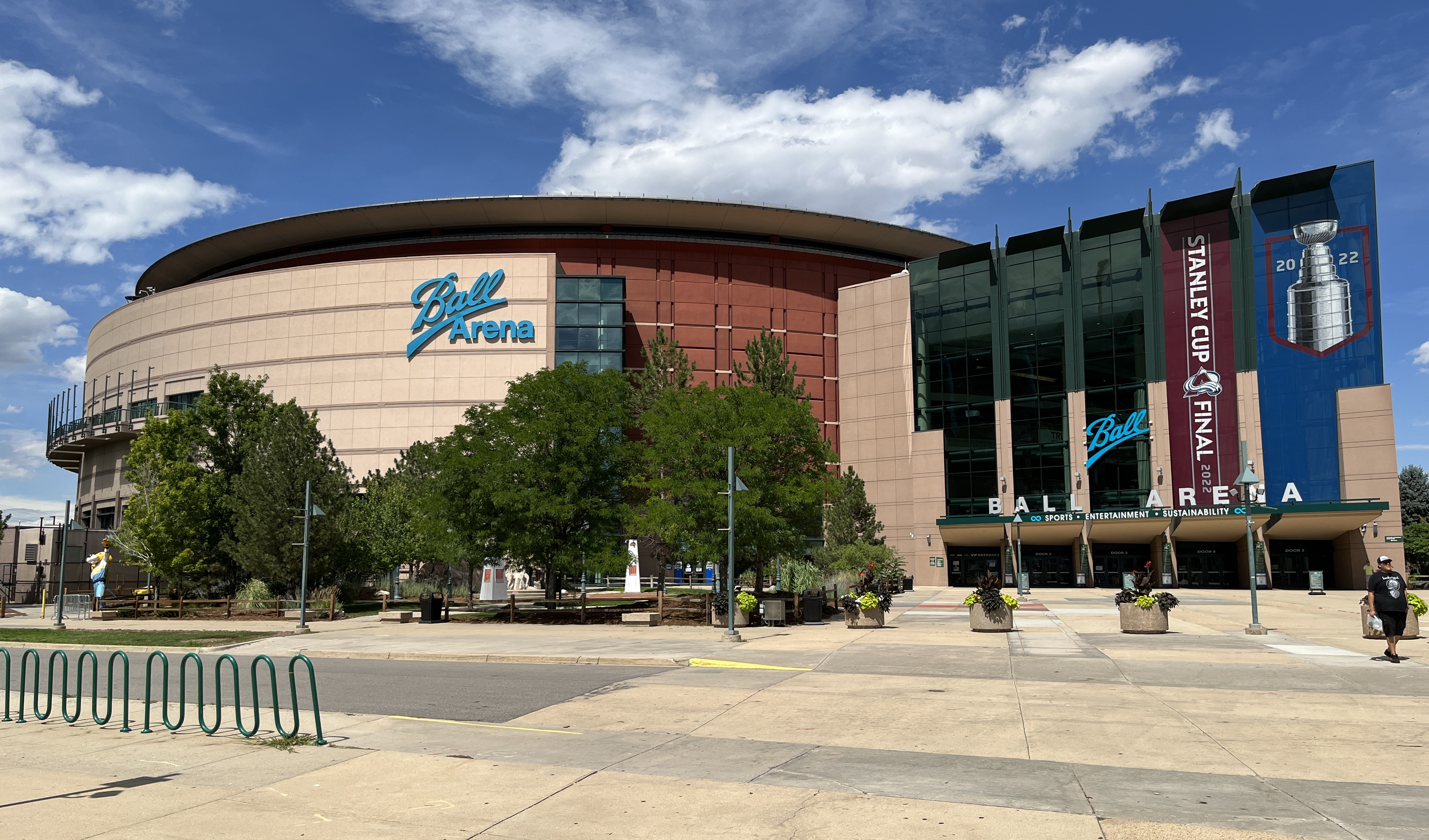
Ball Arena

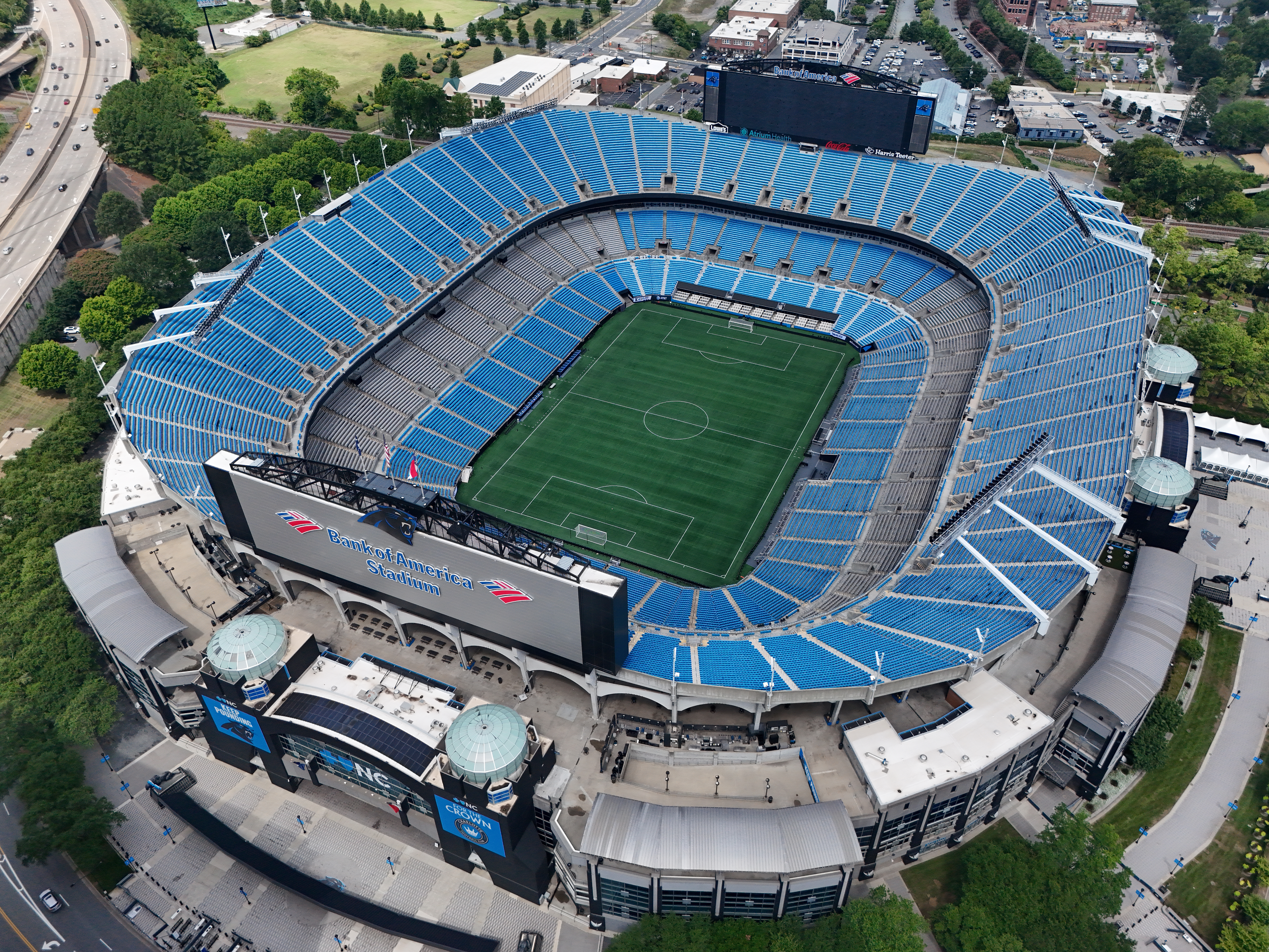
Bank of America Stadium

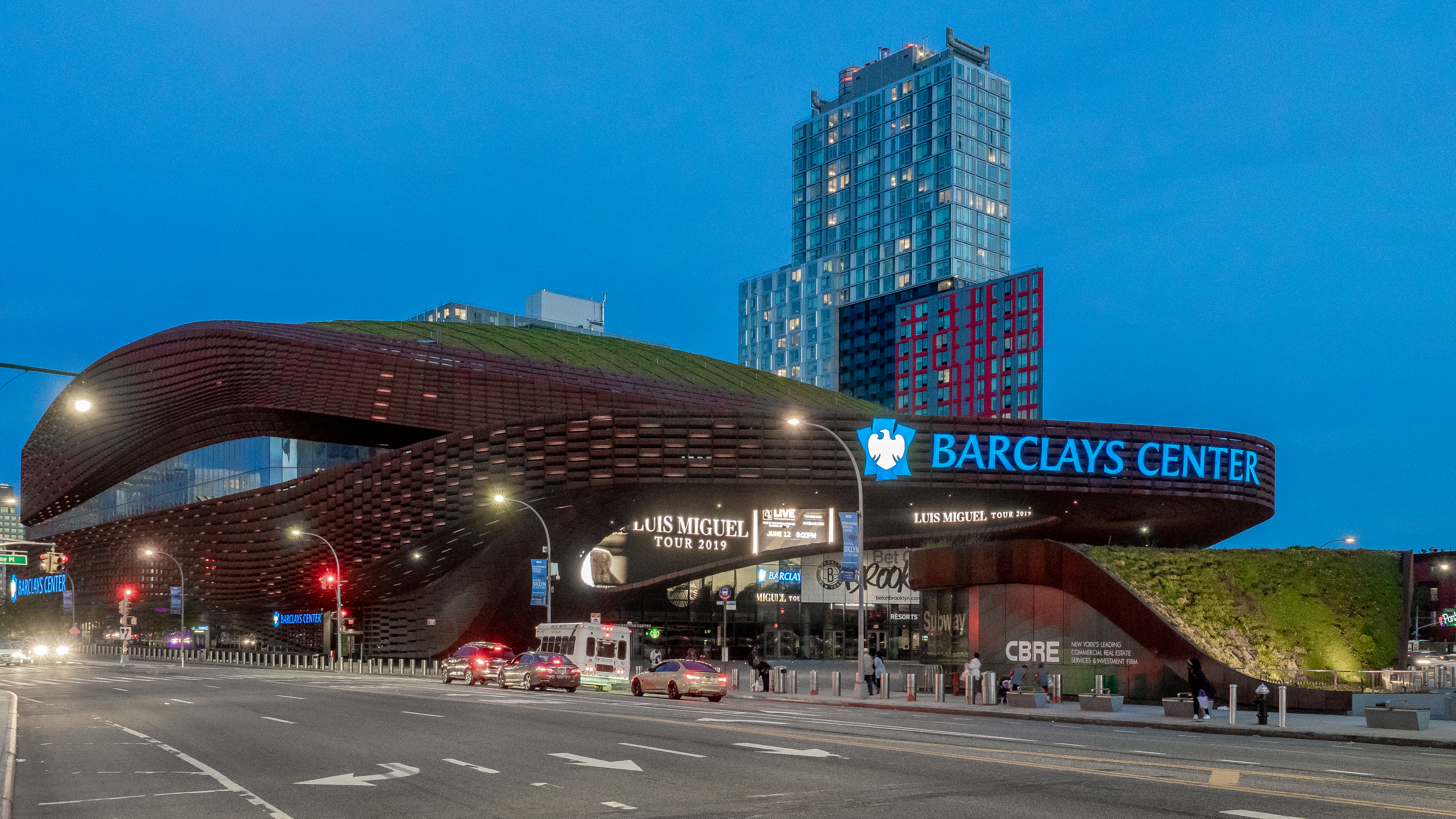
Barclays Center

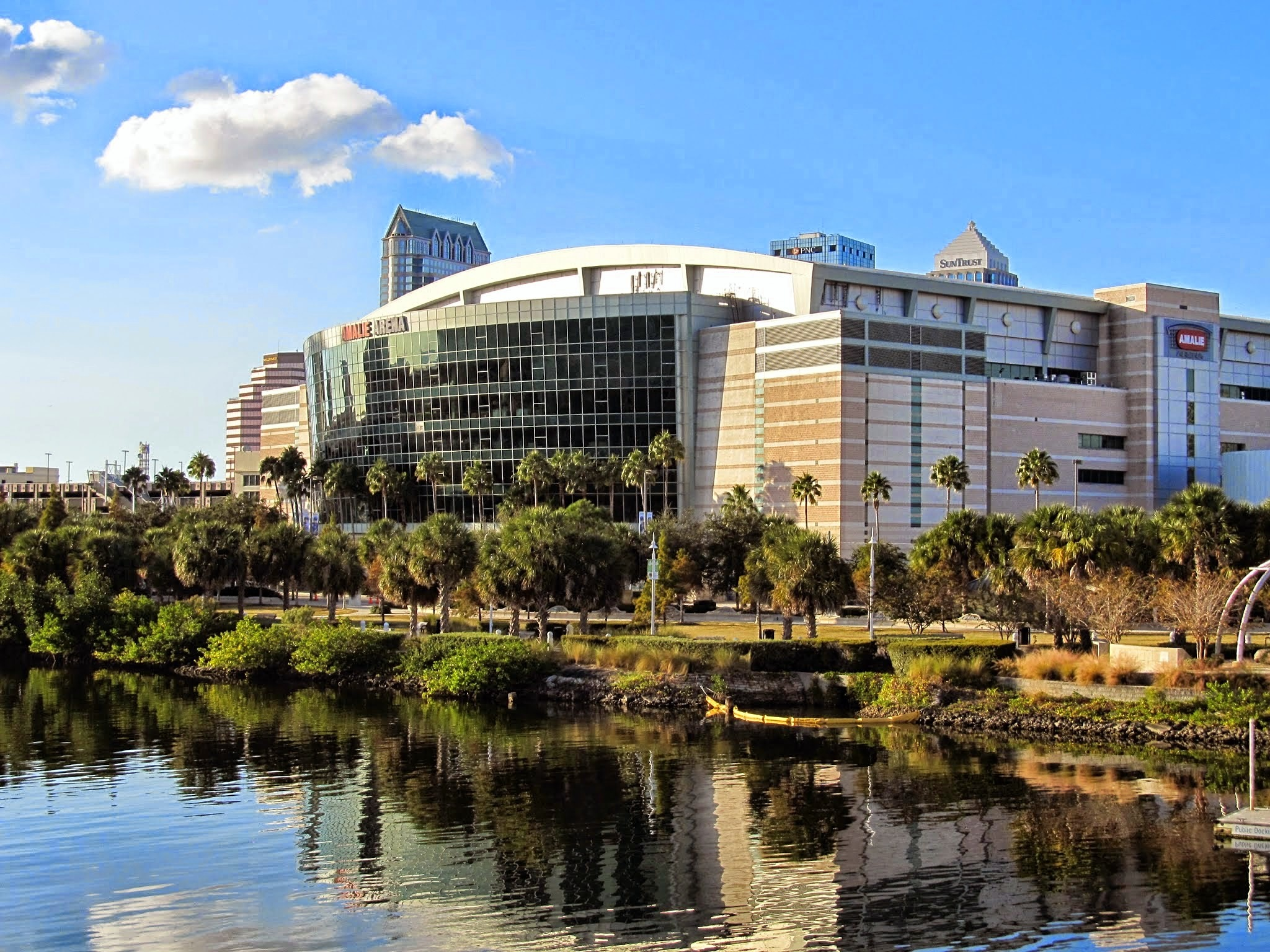
Benchmark International Arena

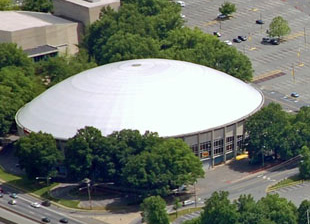
Bojangles Coliseum

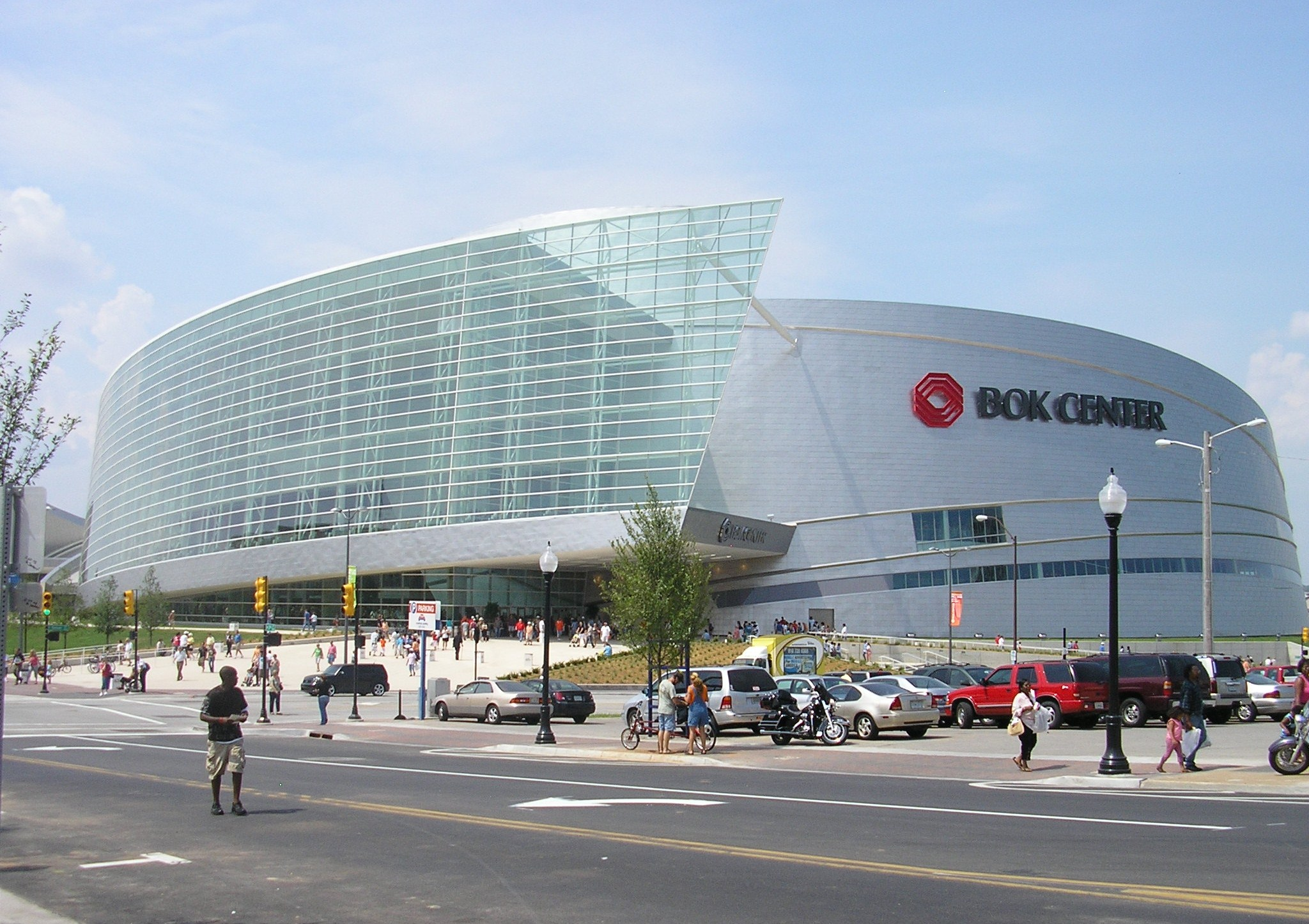
BOK Center

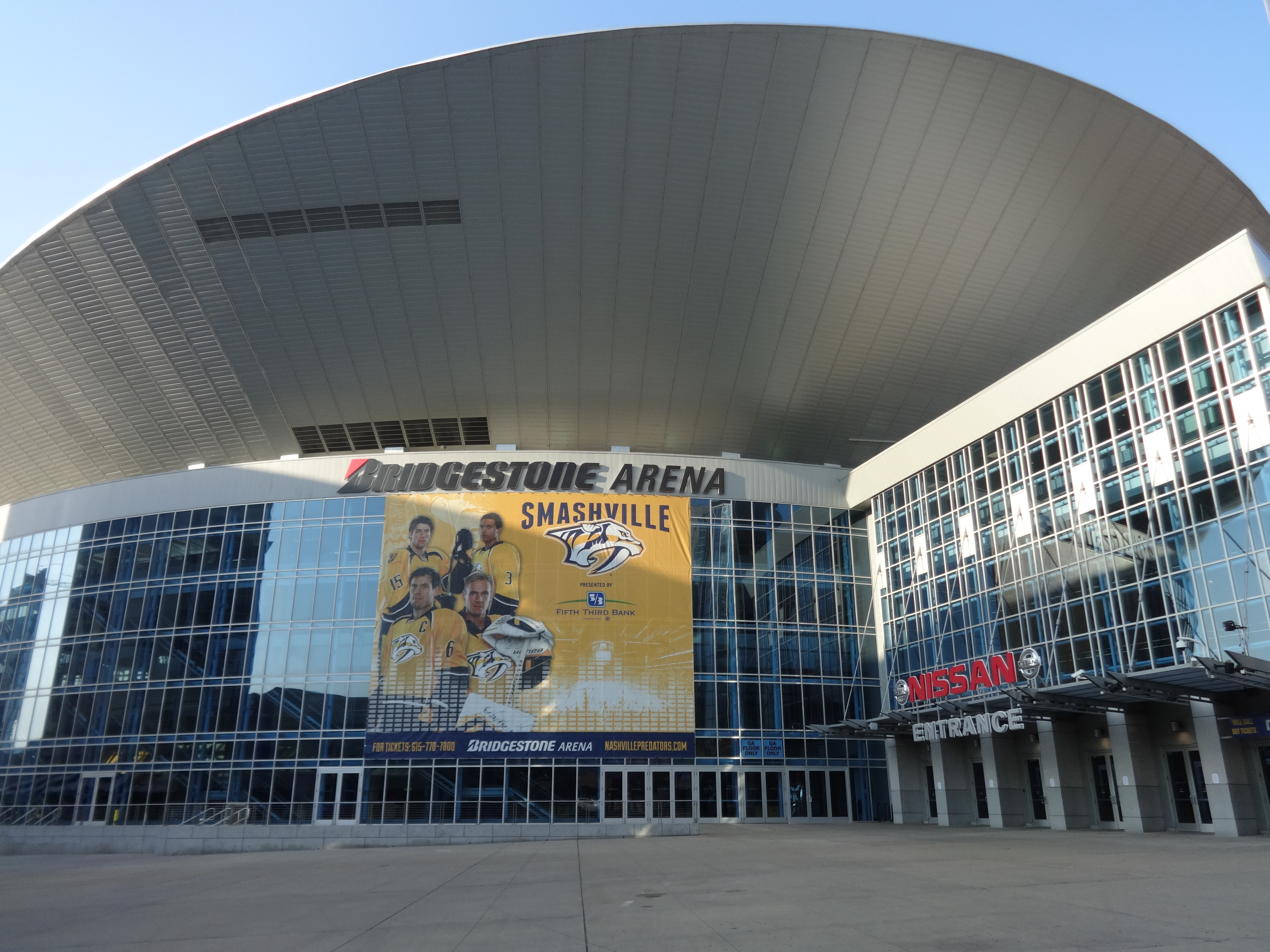
Bridgestone Arena

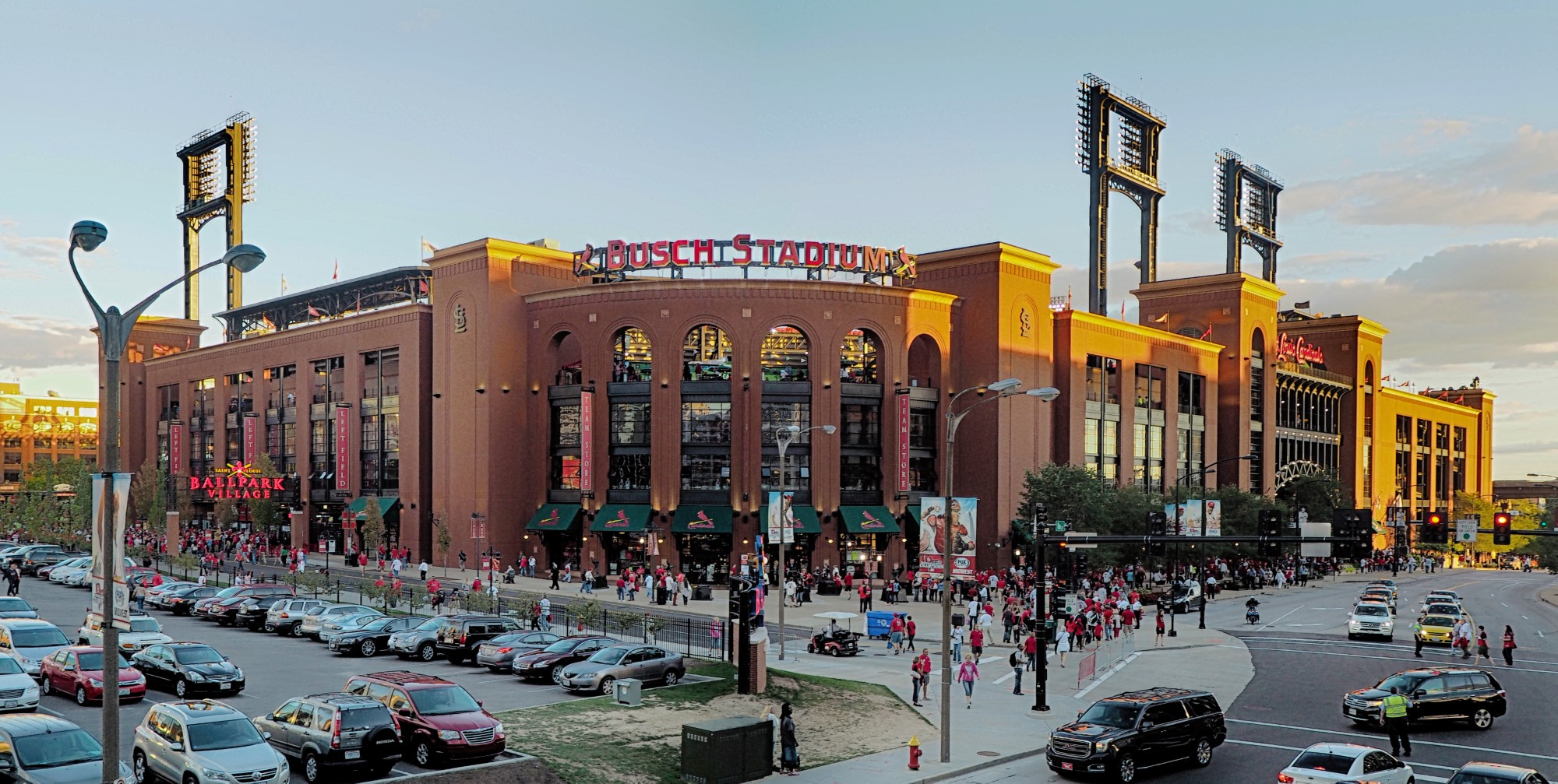
Busch Stadium

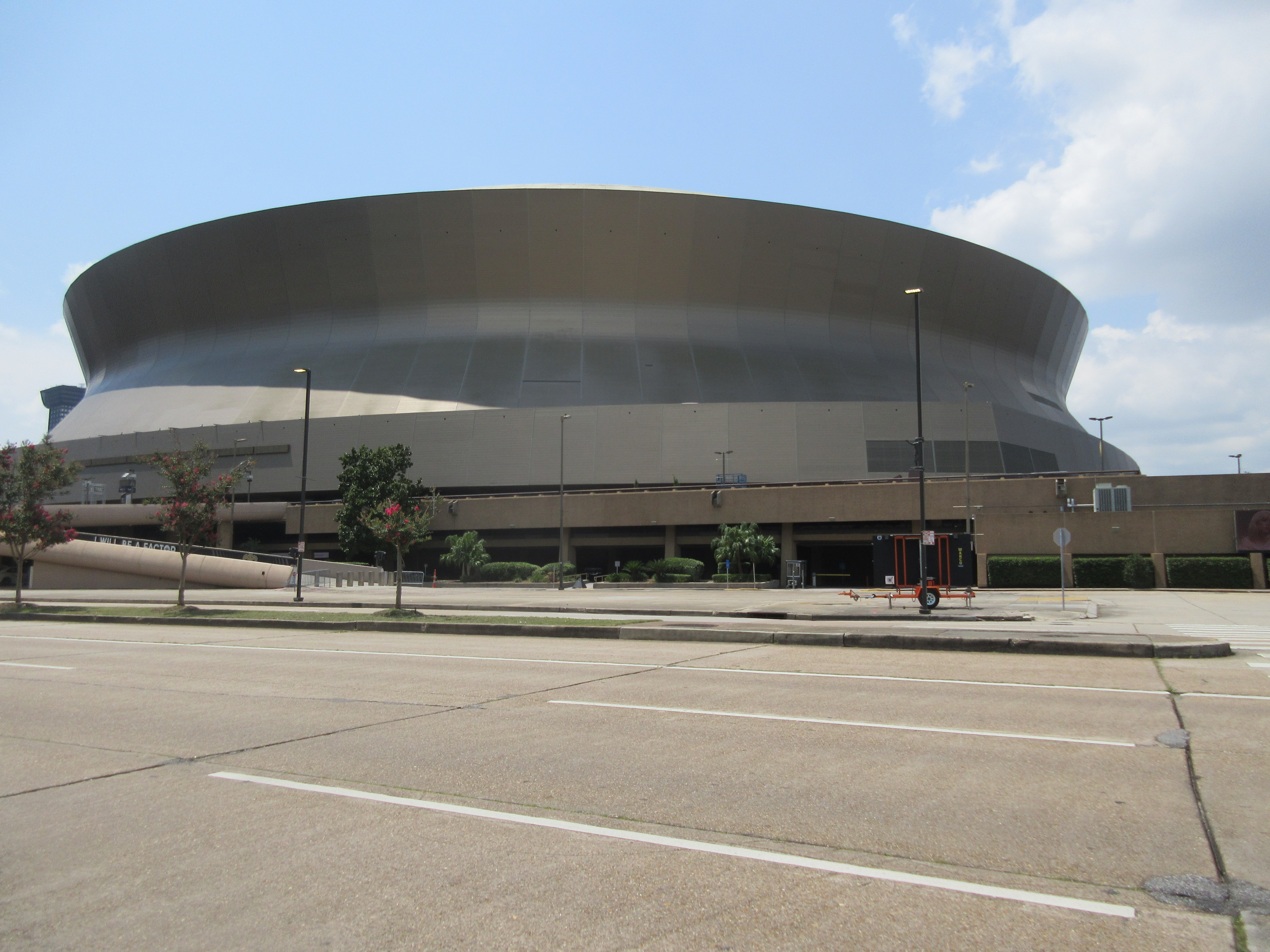
Caesars Superdome

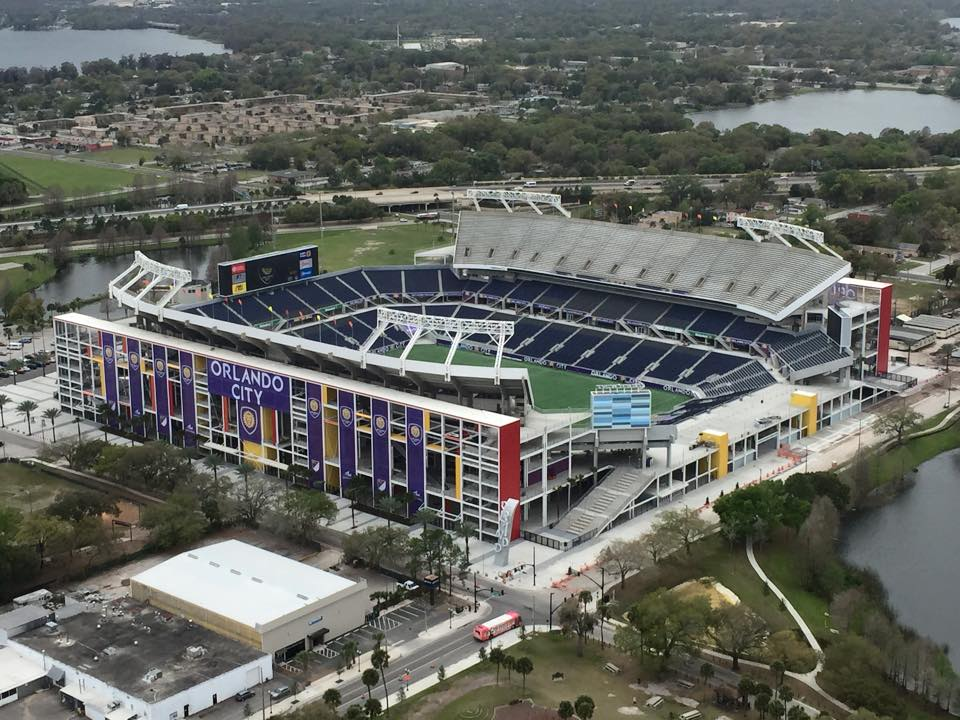
Camping World Stadium

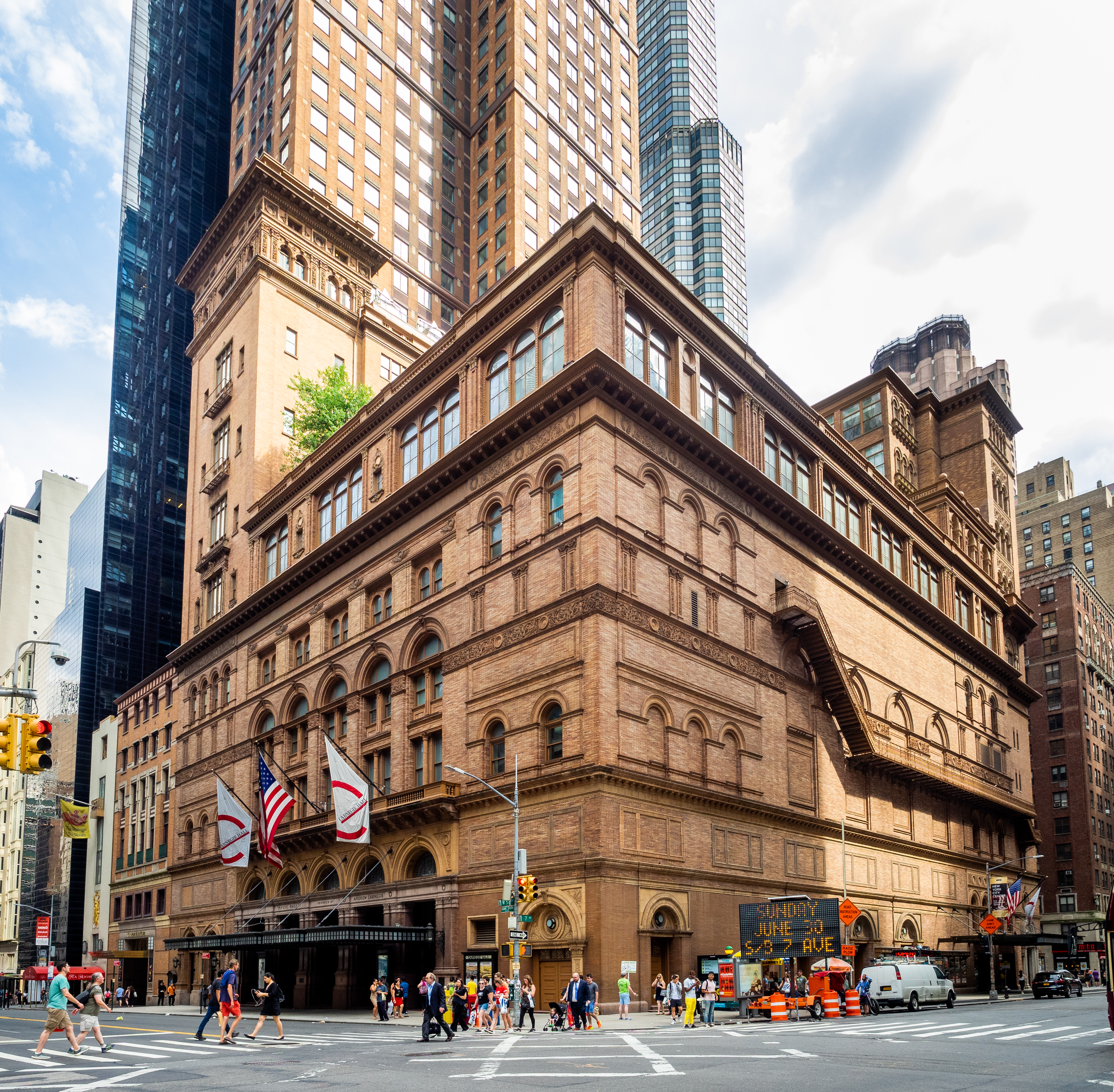
Carnegie Hall

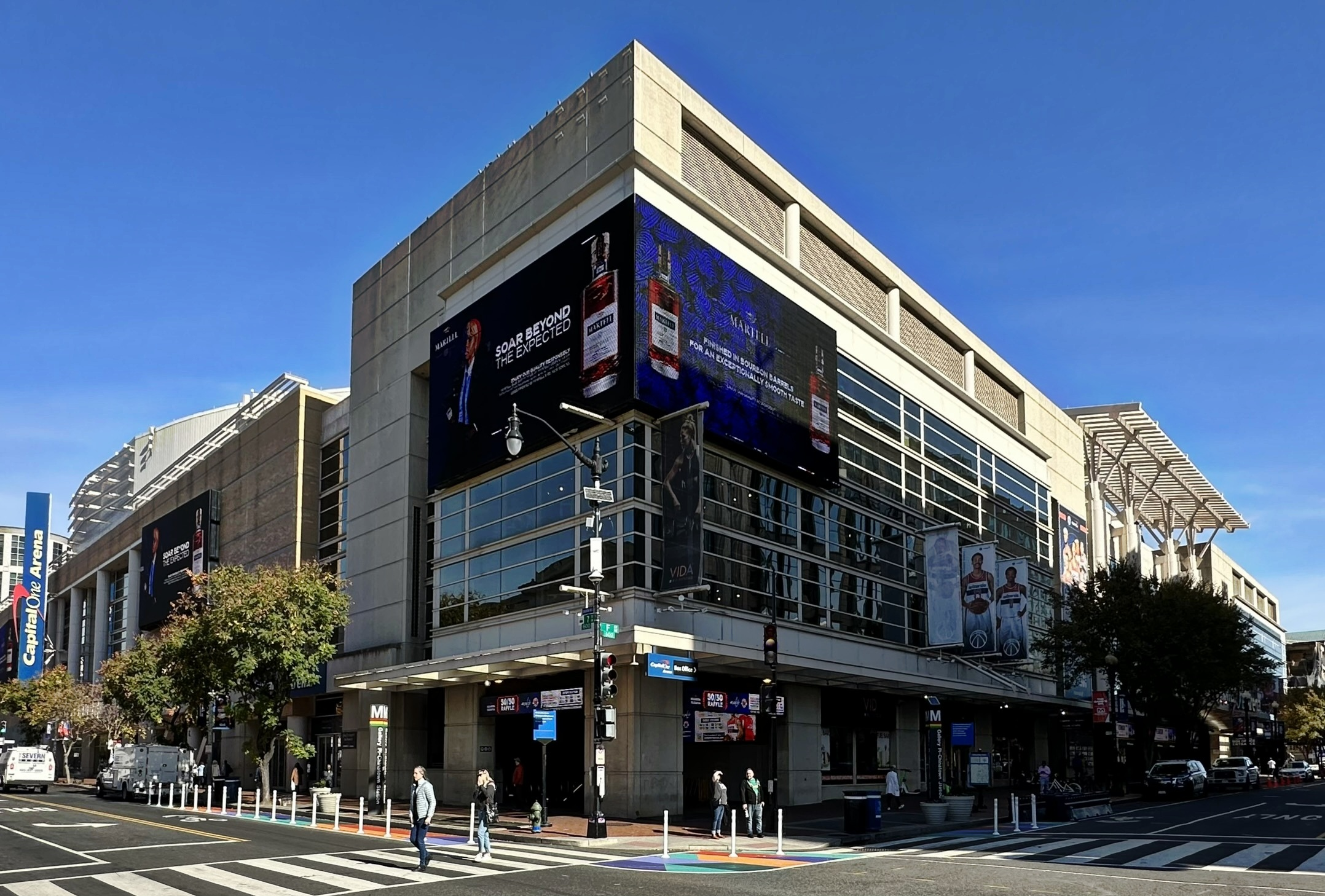
Capital One Arena

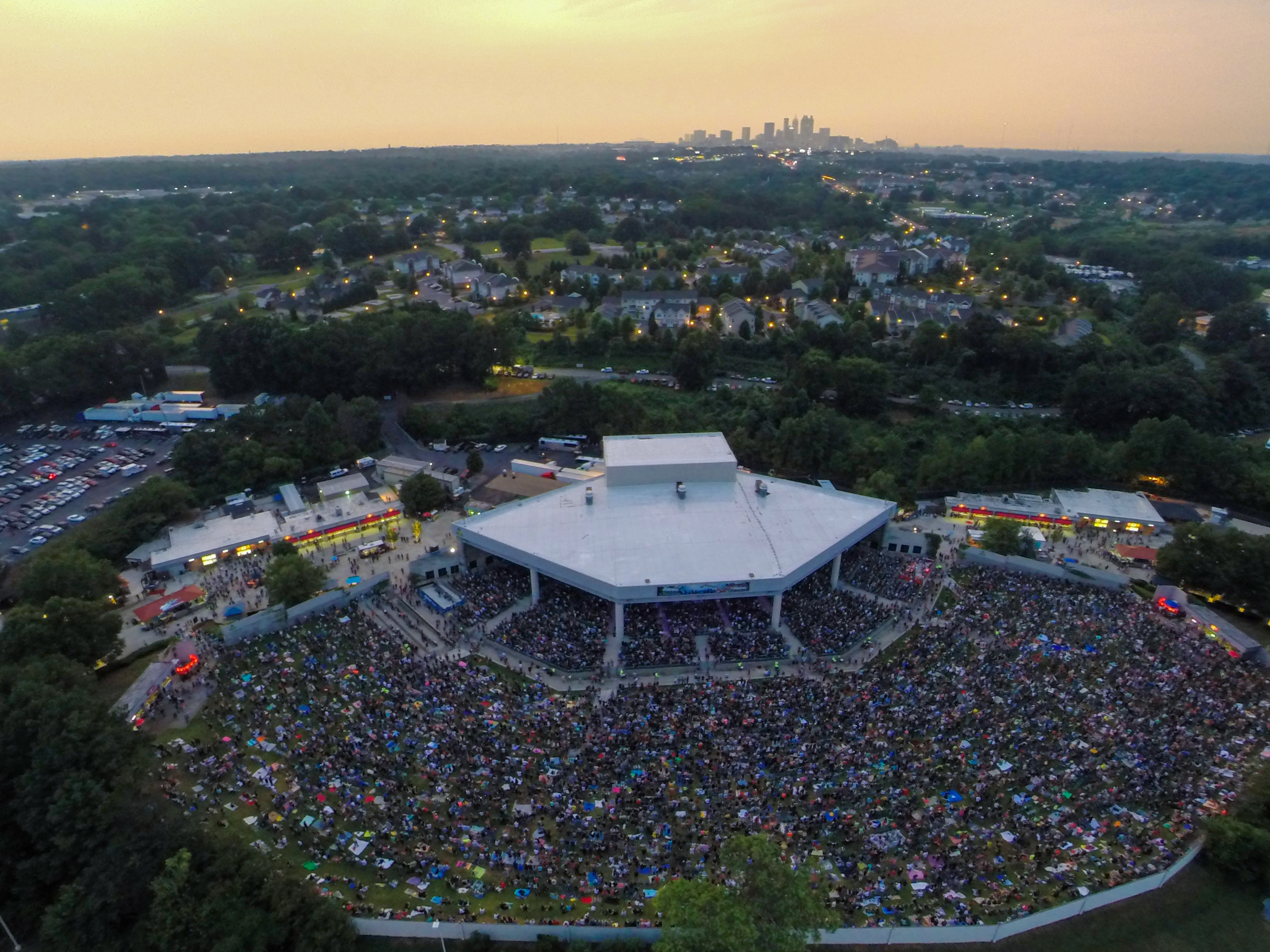
Cellairis Amphitheatre

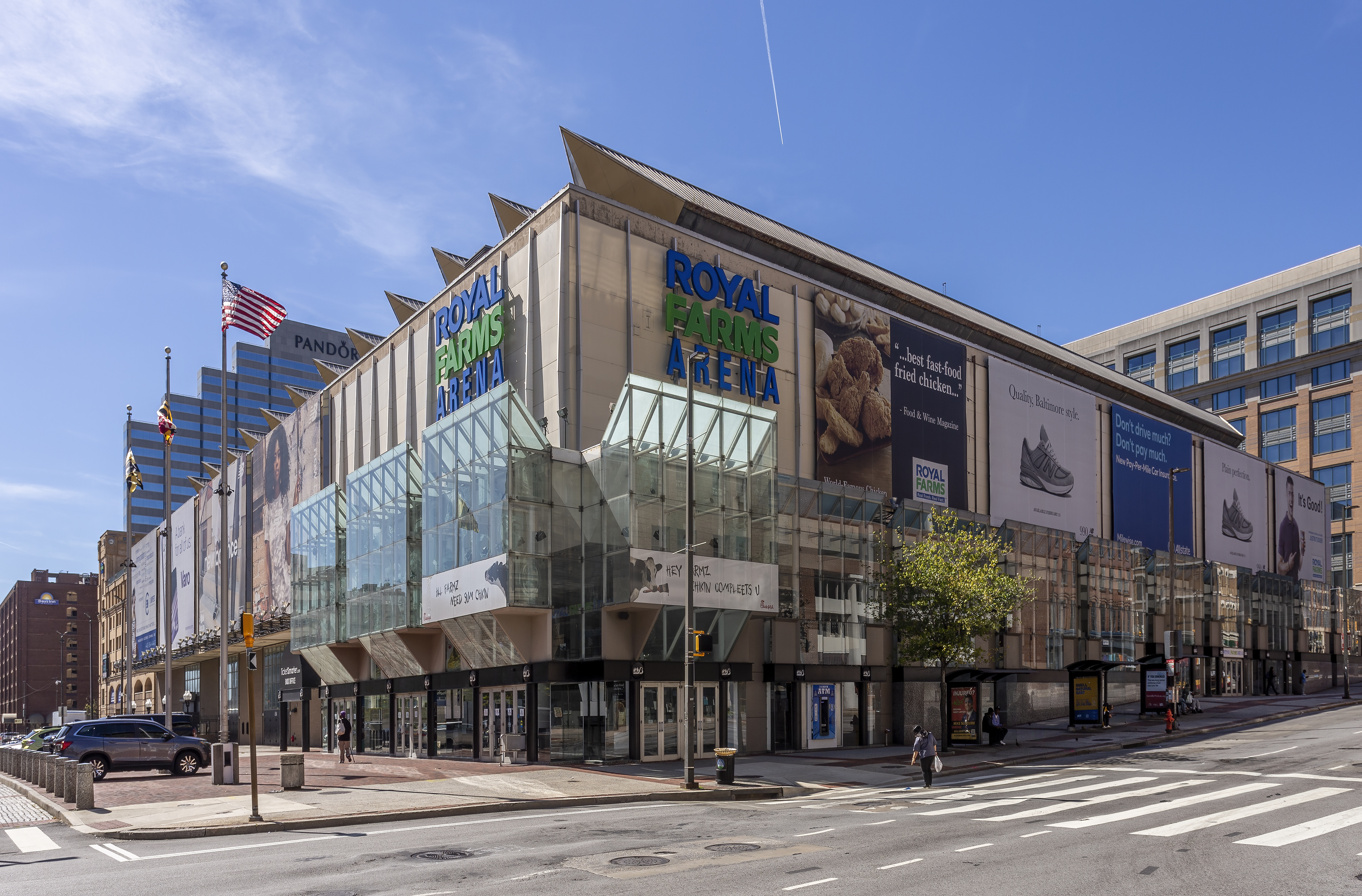
CFG Bank Arena

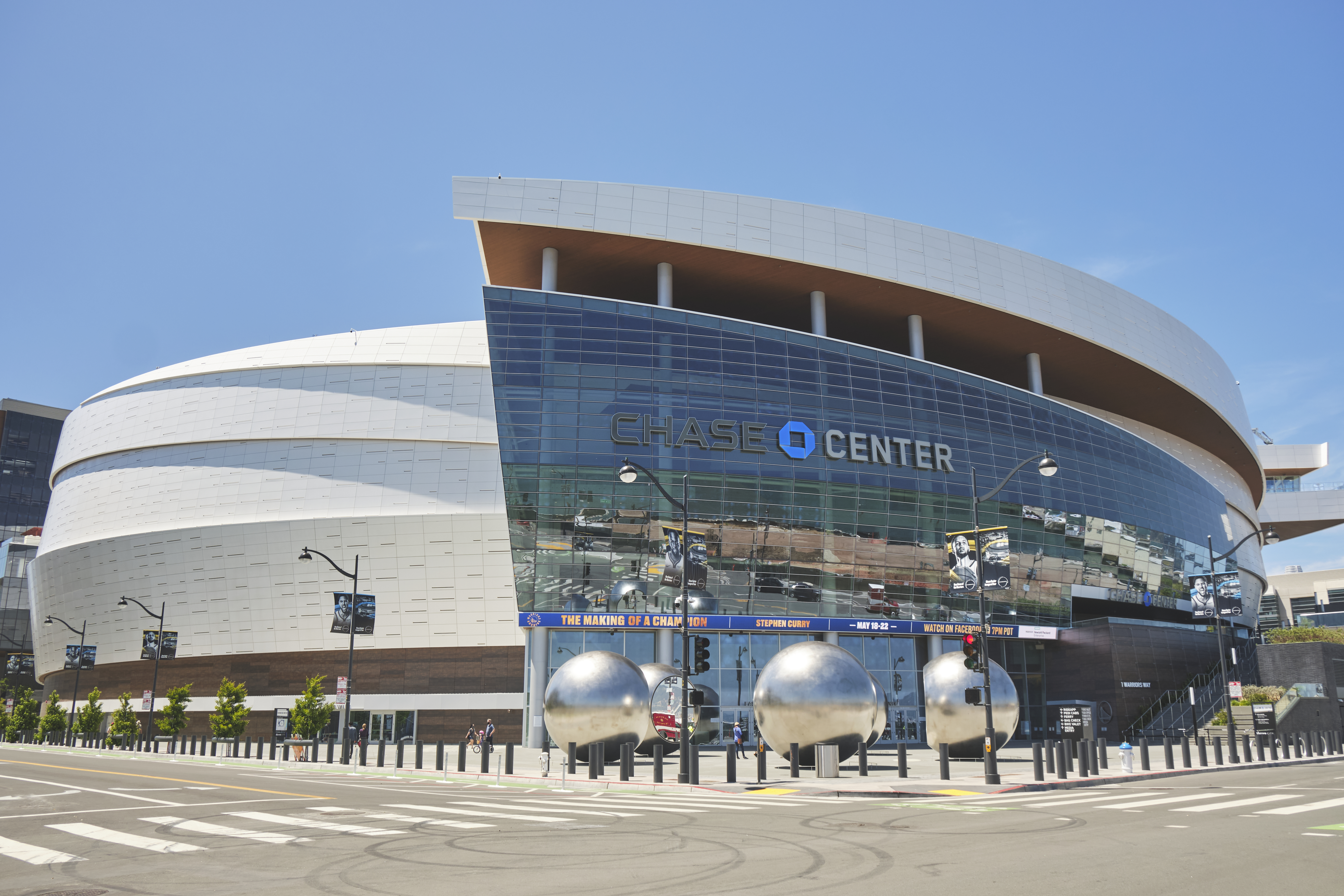
Chase Center

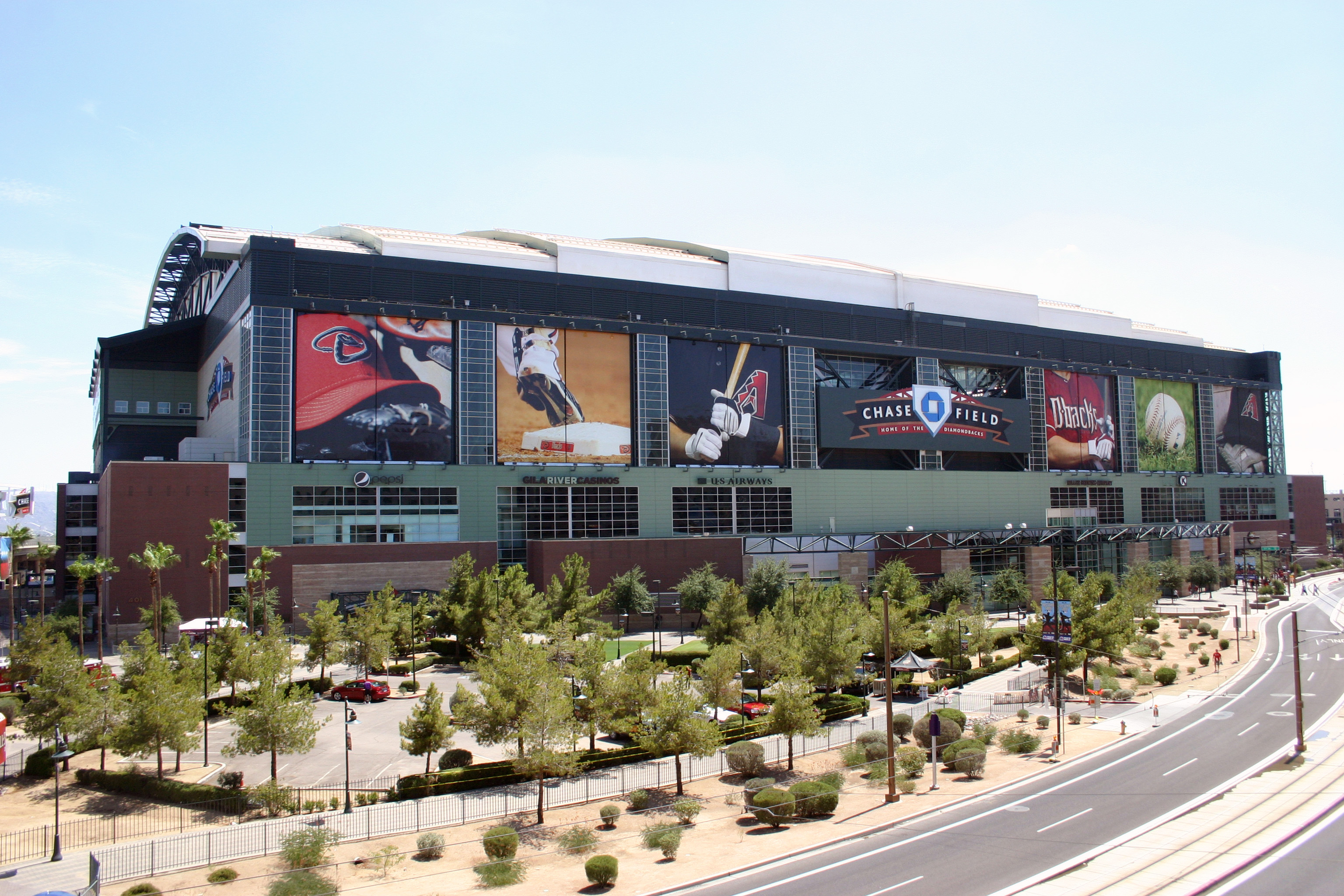
Chase Field

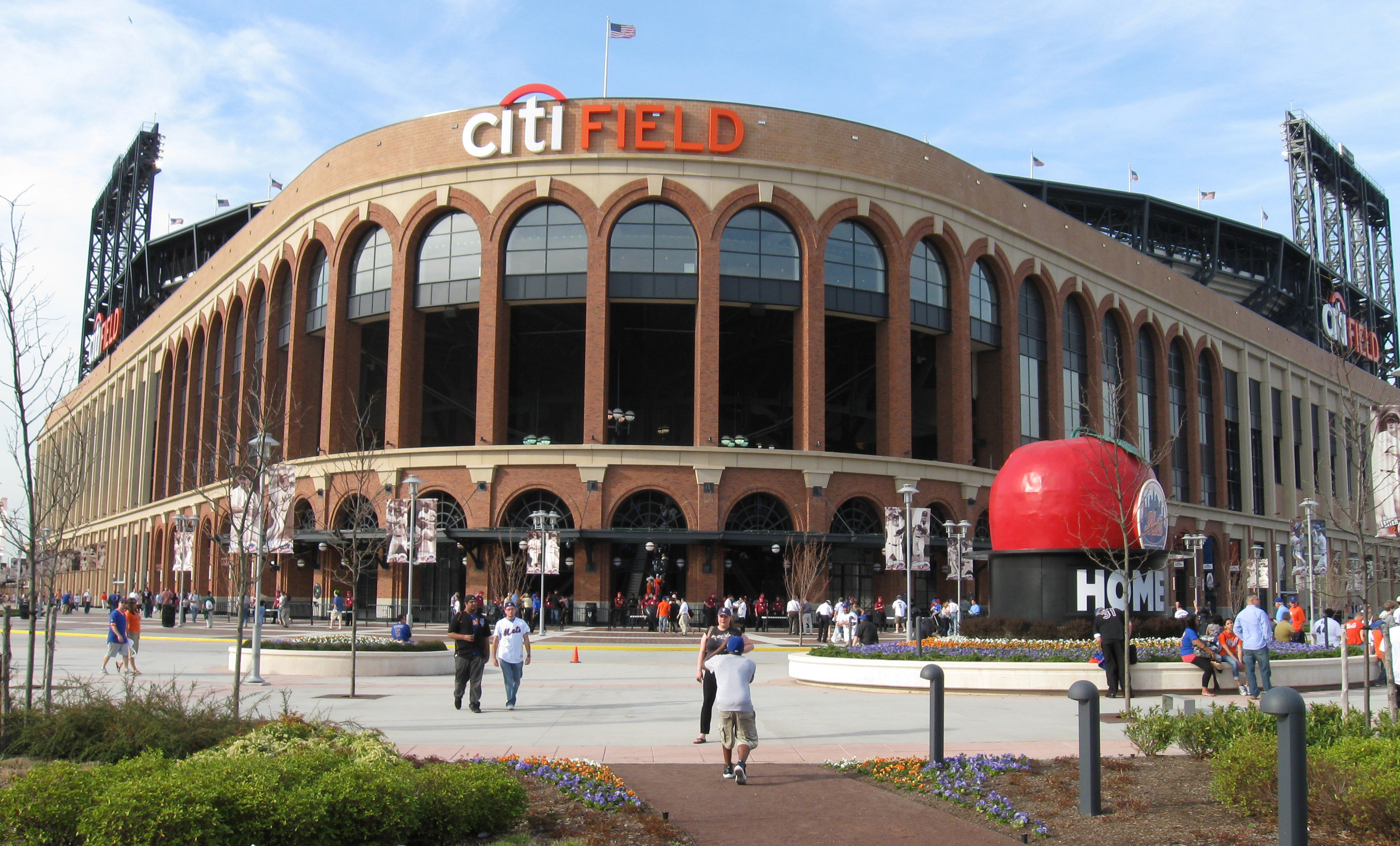
Citi Field

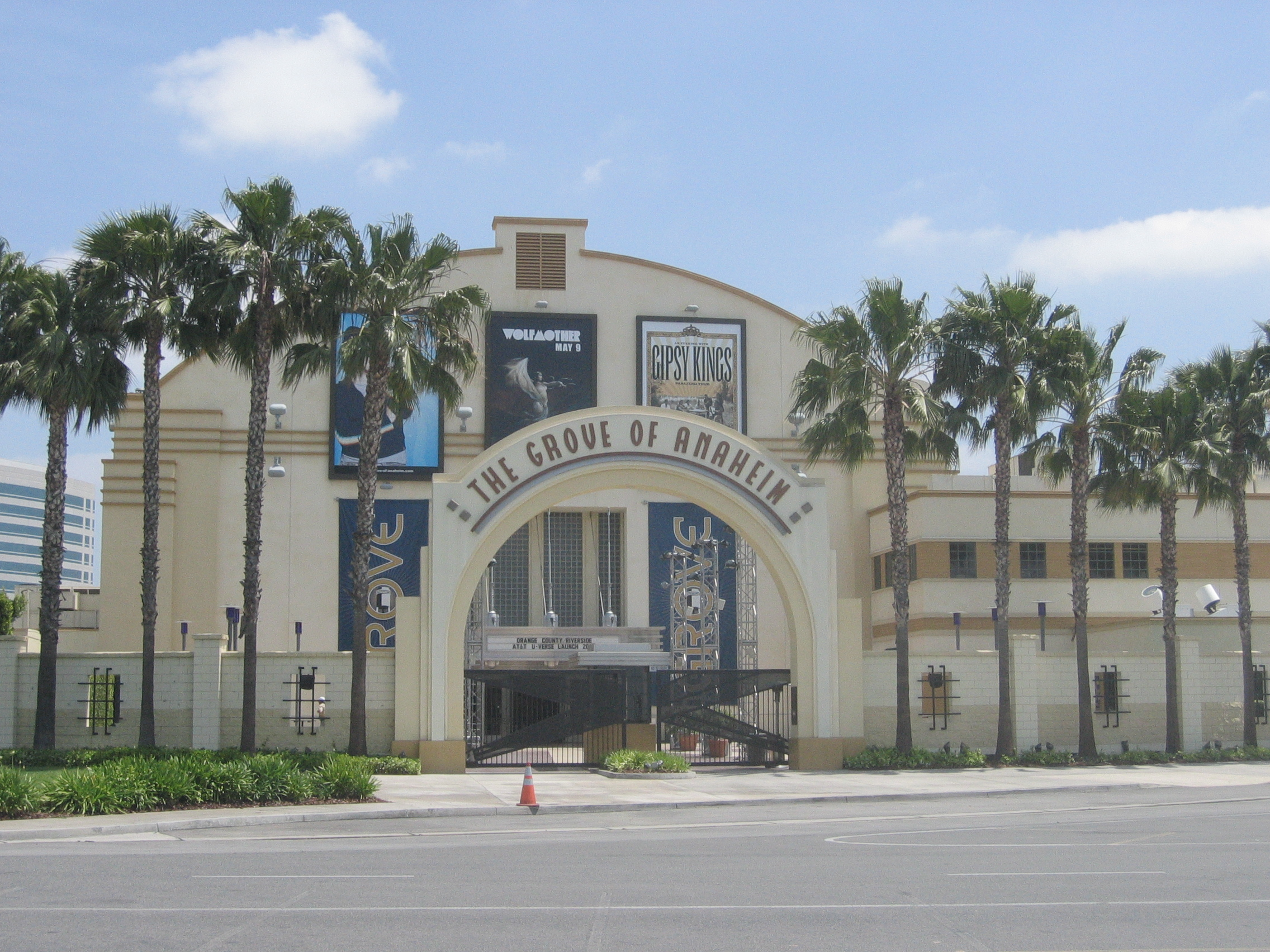
City National Grove of Anaheim

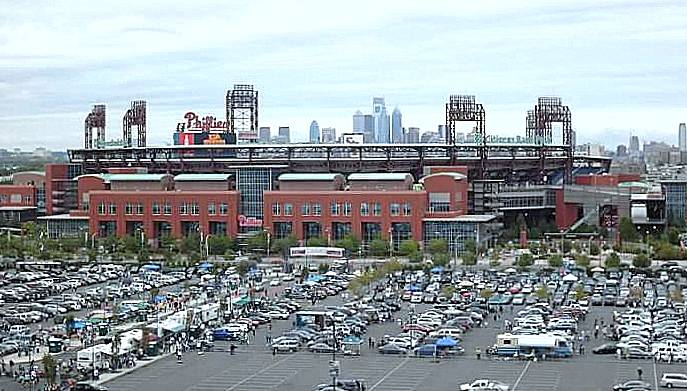
Citizens Bank Park

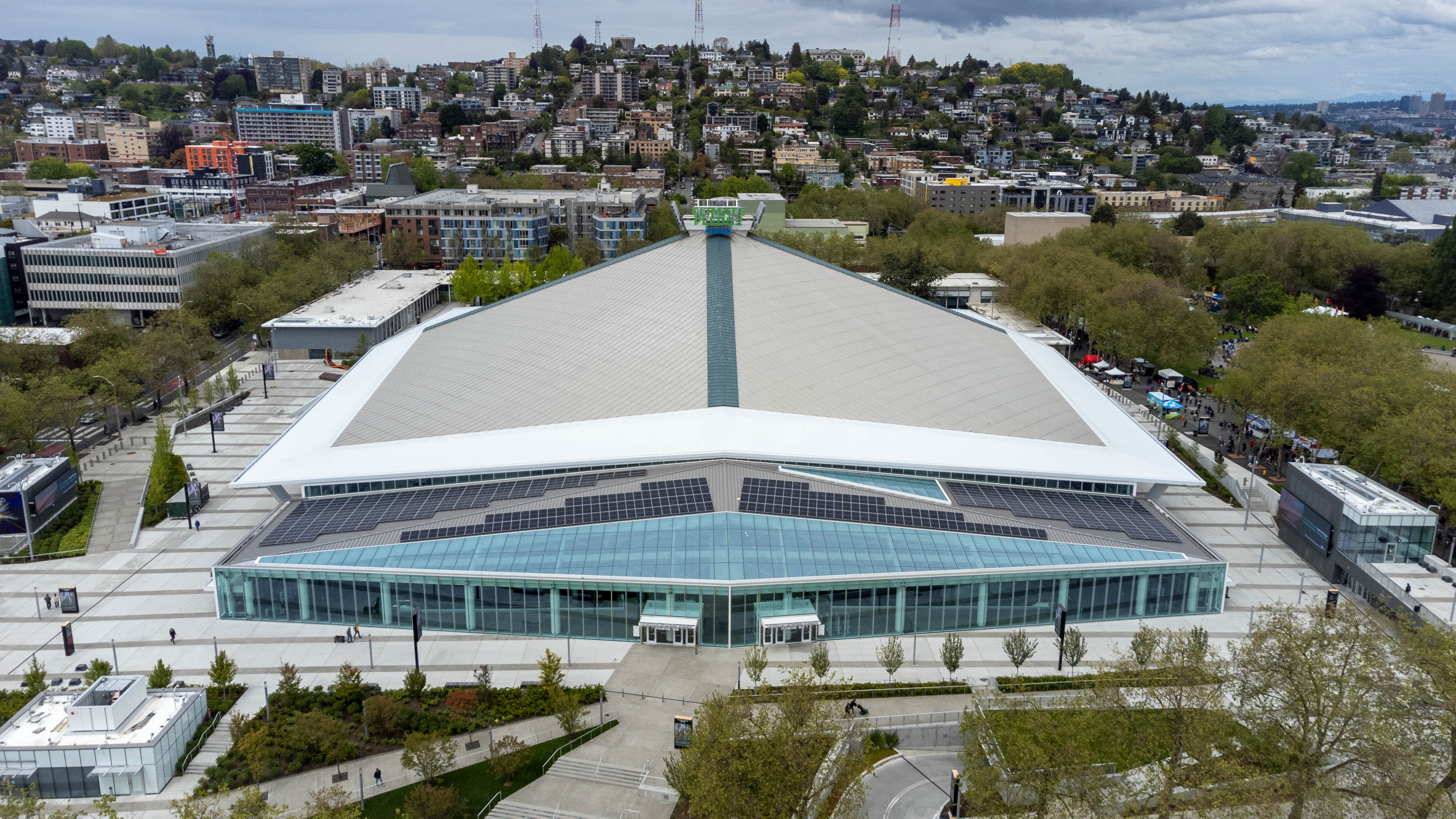
Climate Pledge Arena

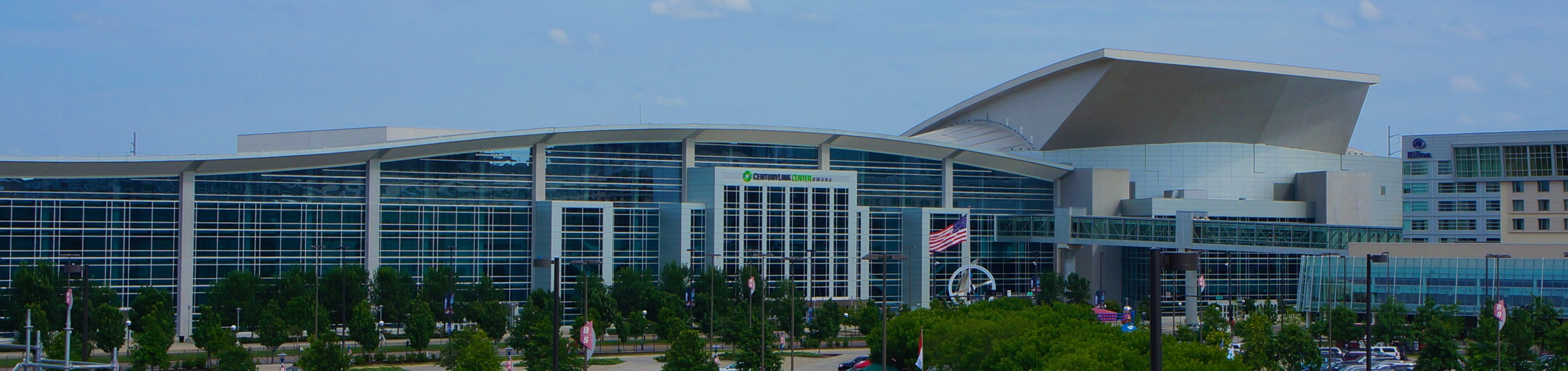
CHI Health Center

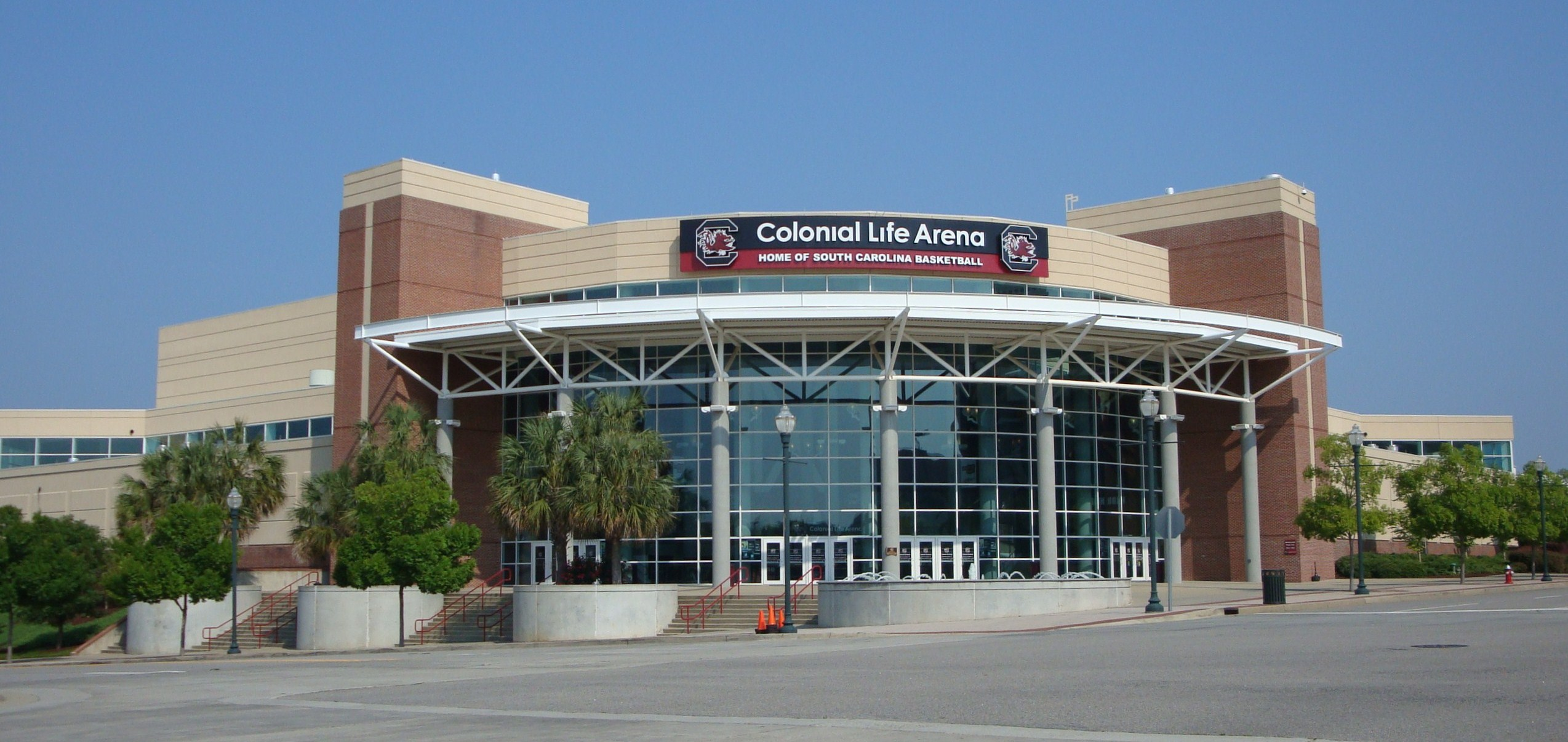
Colonial Life Arena

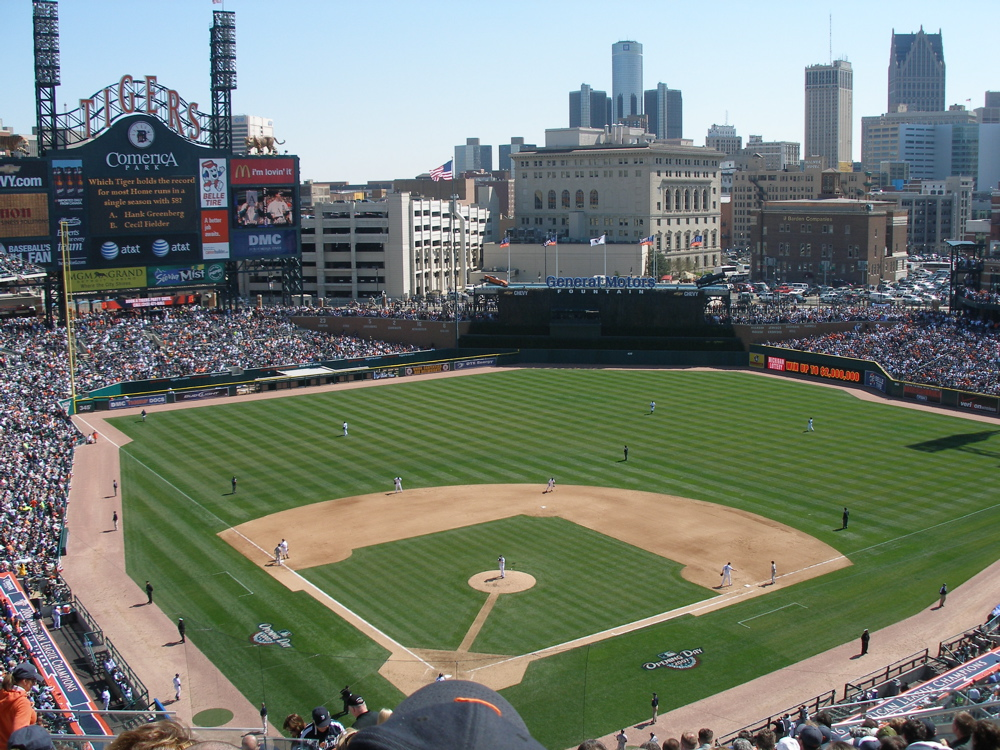
Comerica Park

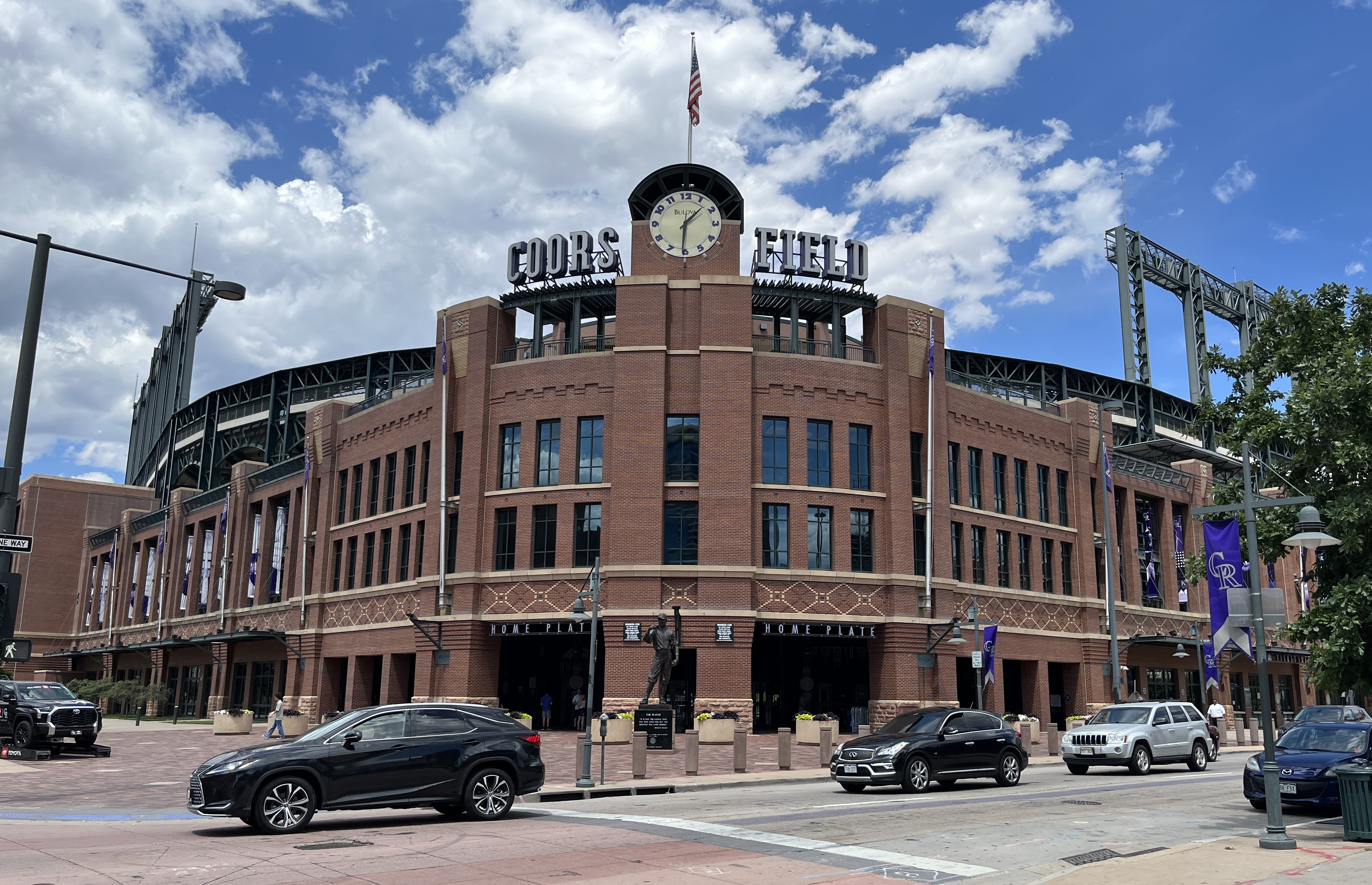
Coors Field

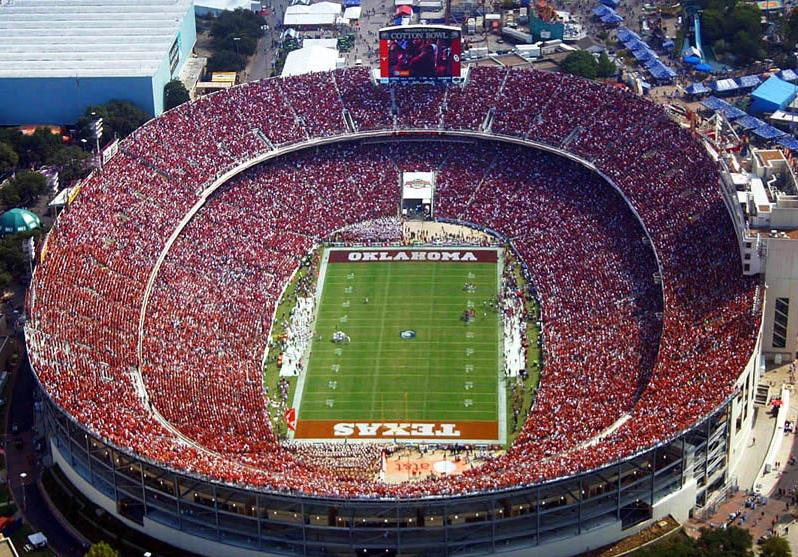
Cotton Bowl

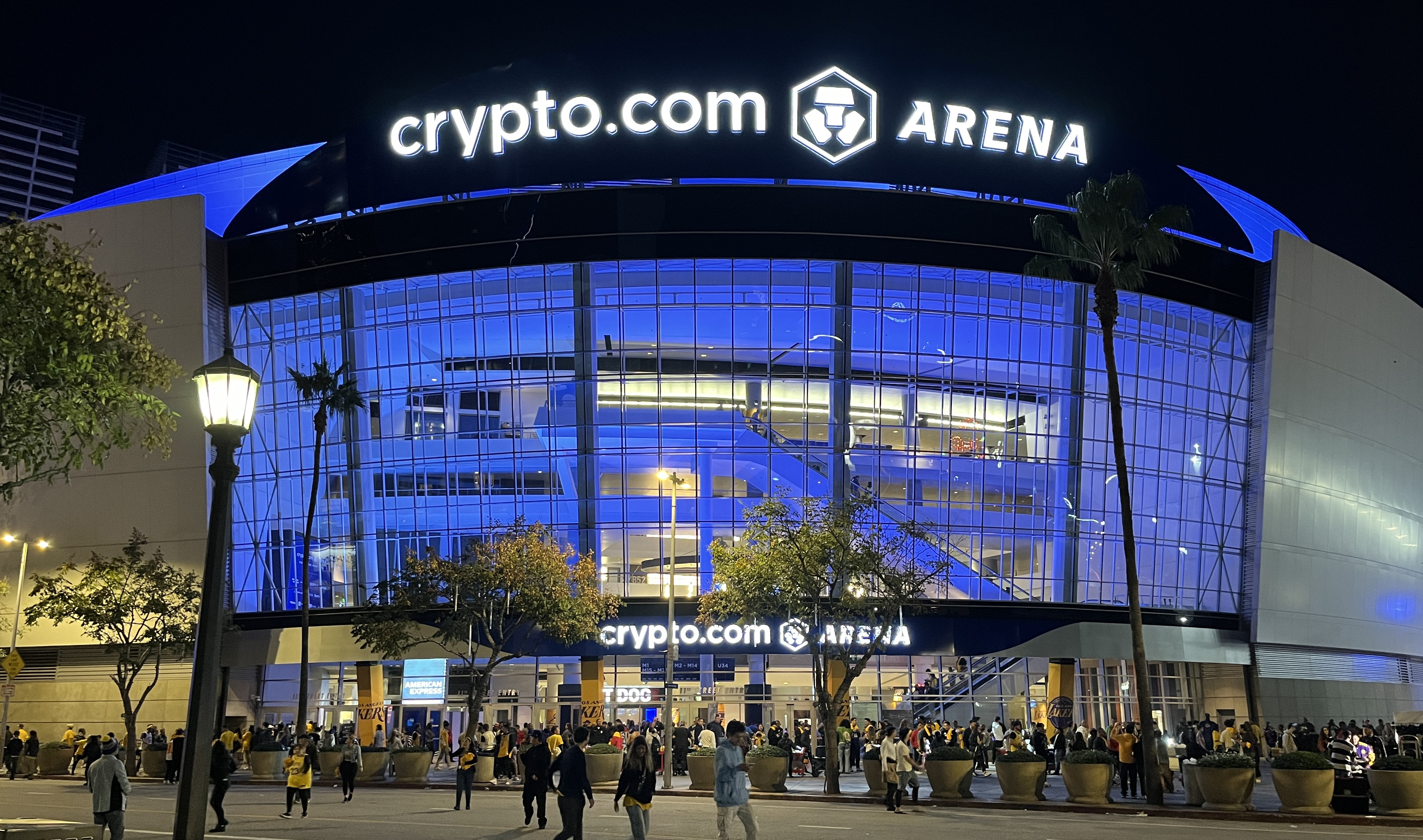
Crypto.com Arena

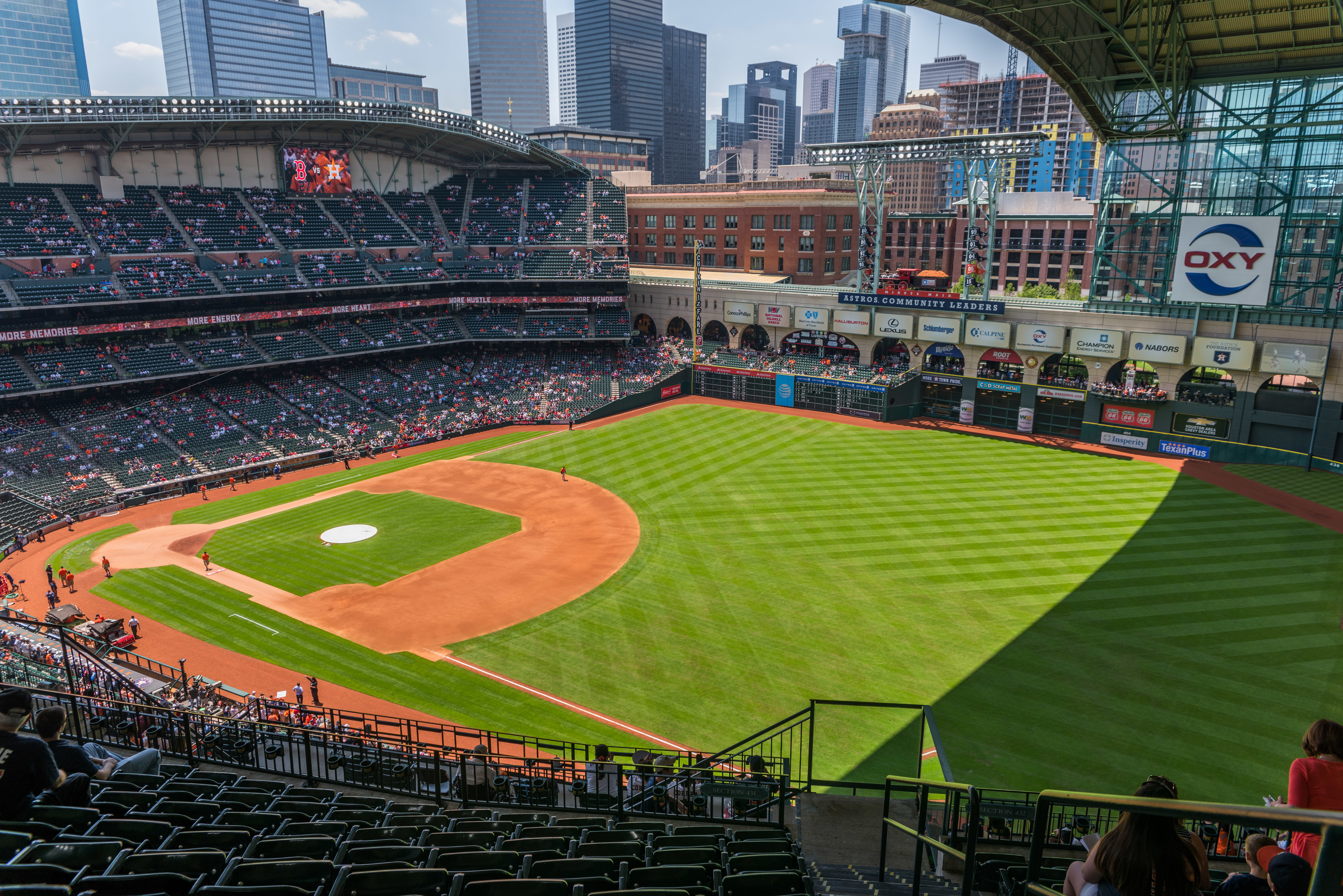
Daikin Park

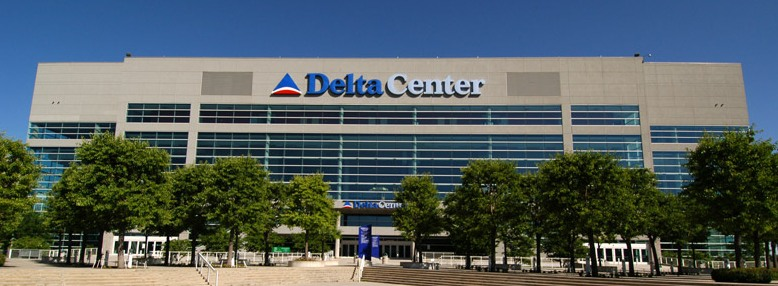
Delta Center

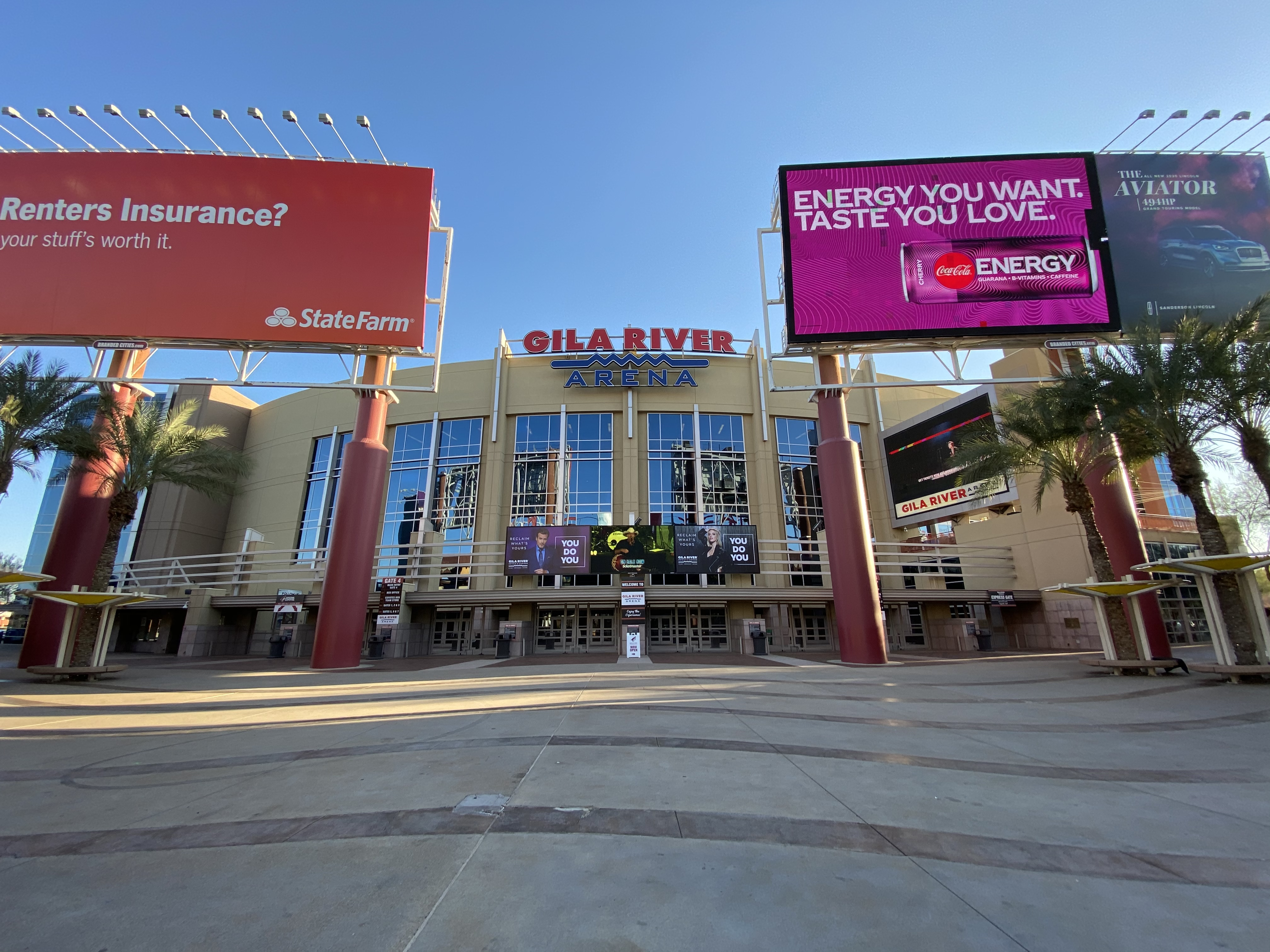
Desert Diamond Arena

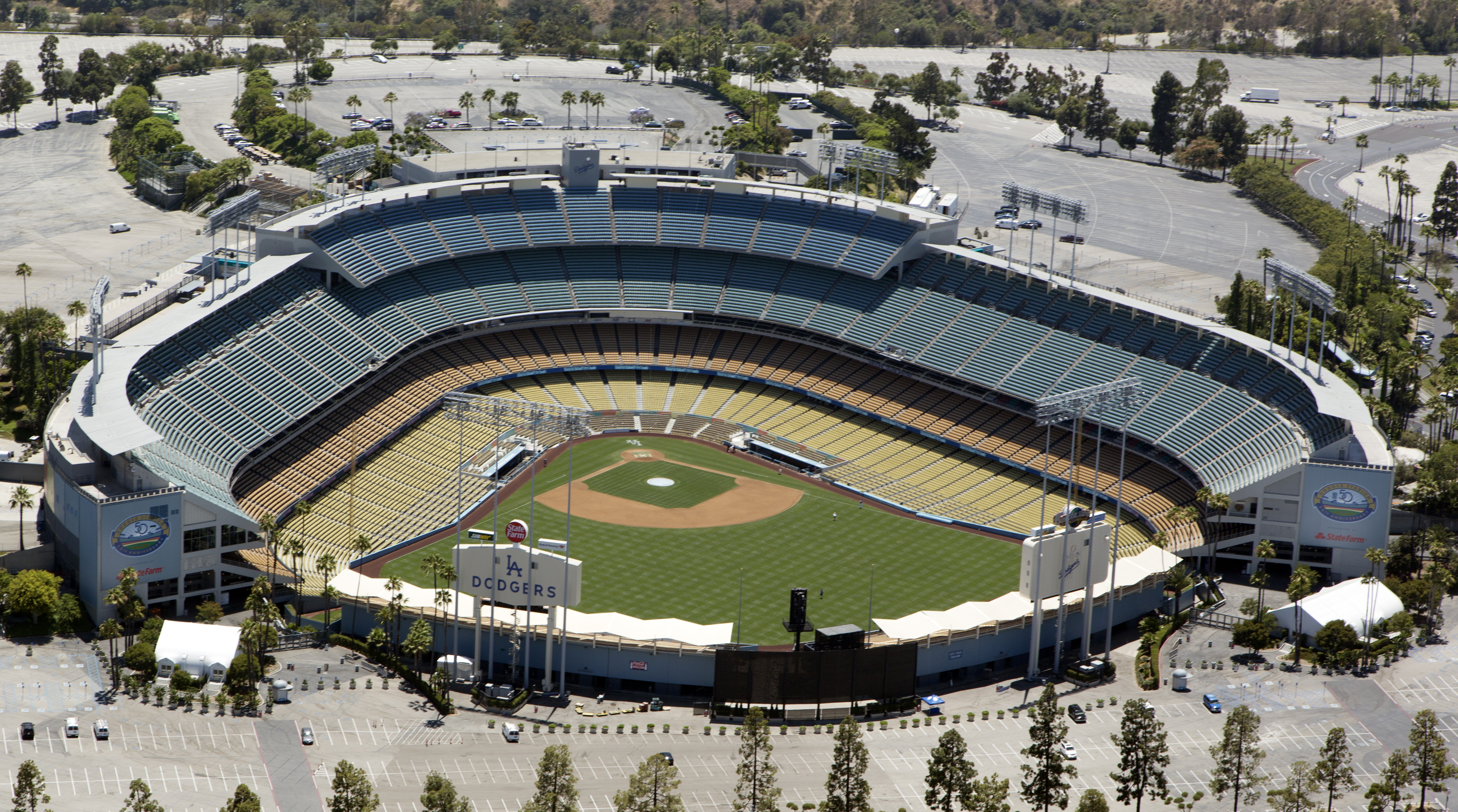
Dodger Stadium

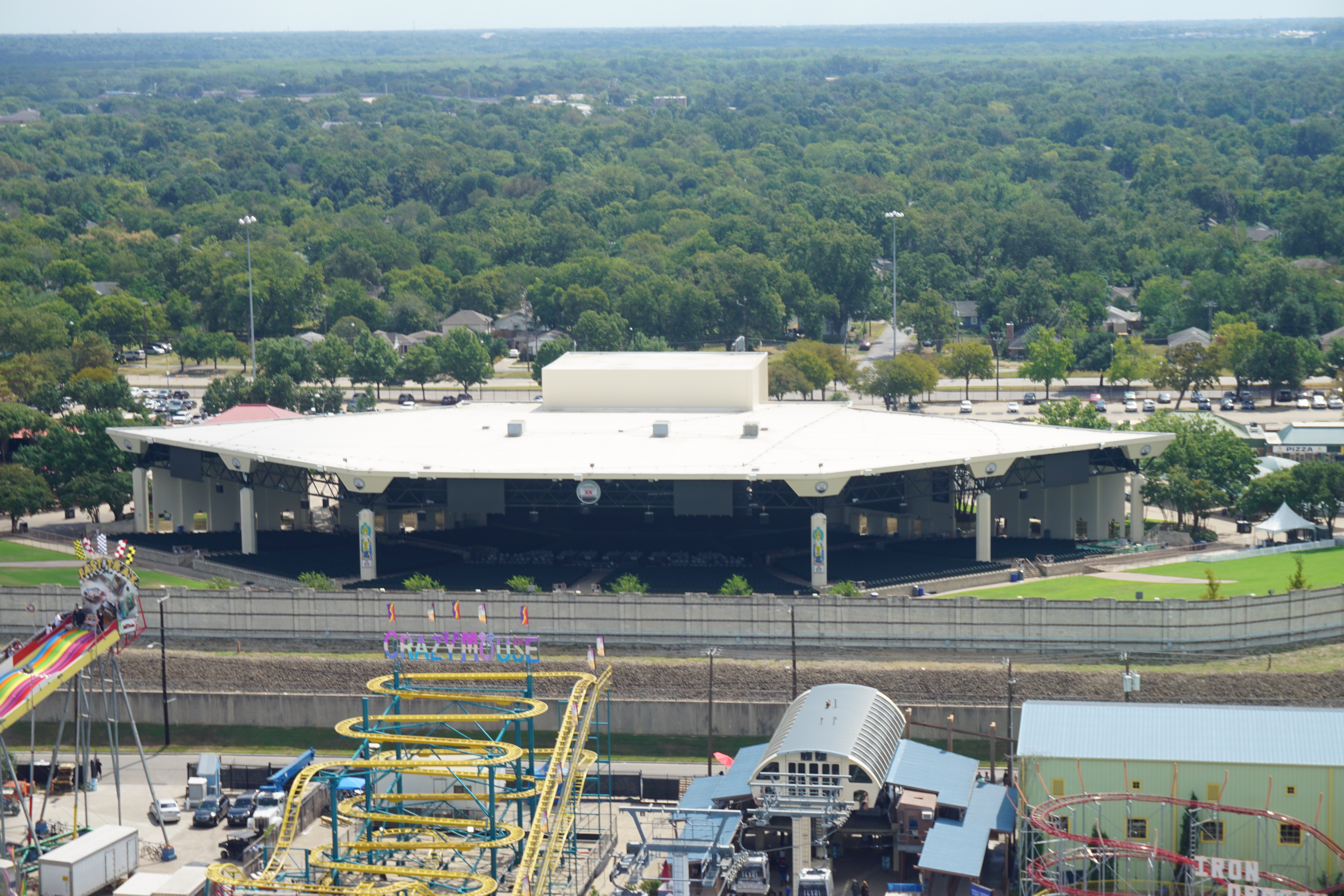
Dos Equis Pavilion

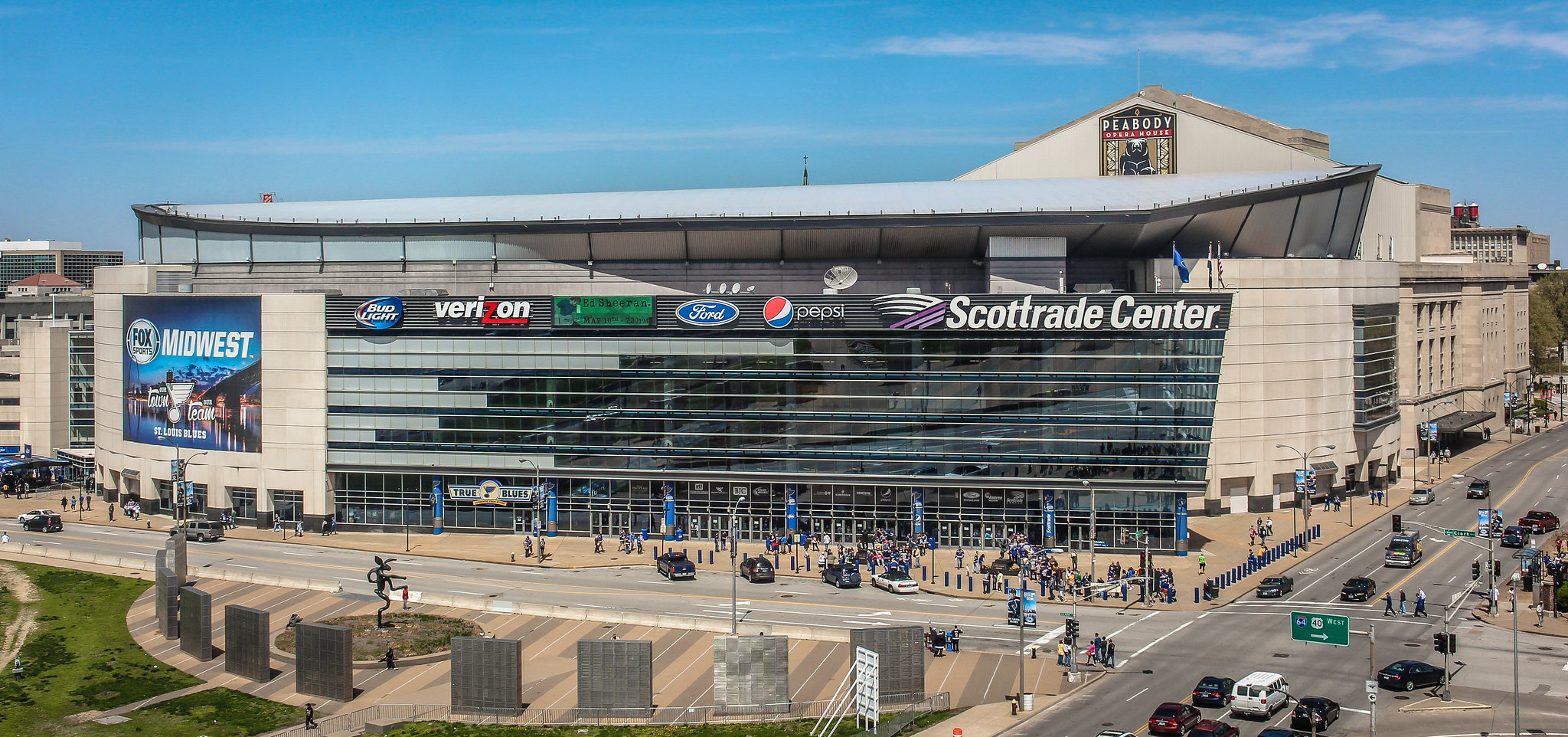
Enterprise Center

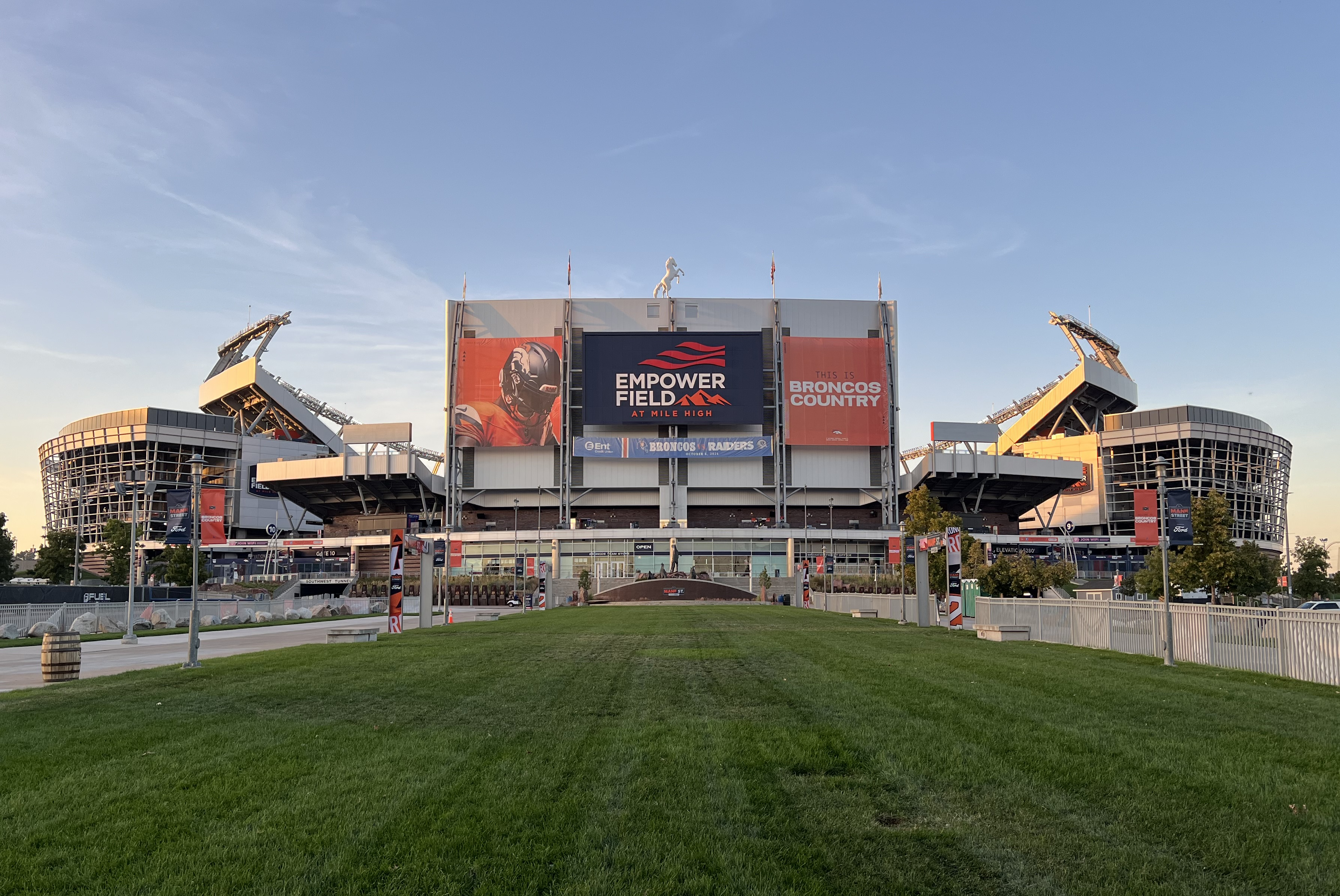
Empower Field at Mile High

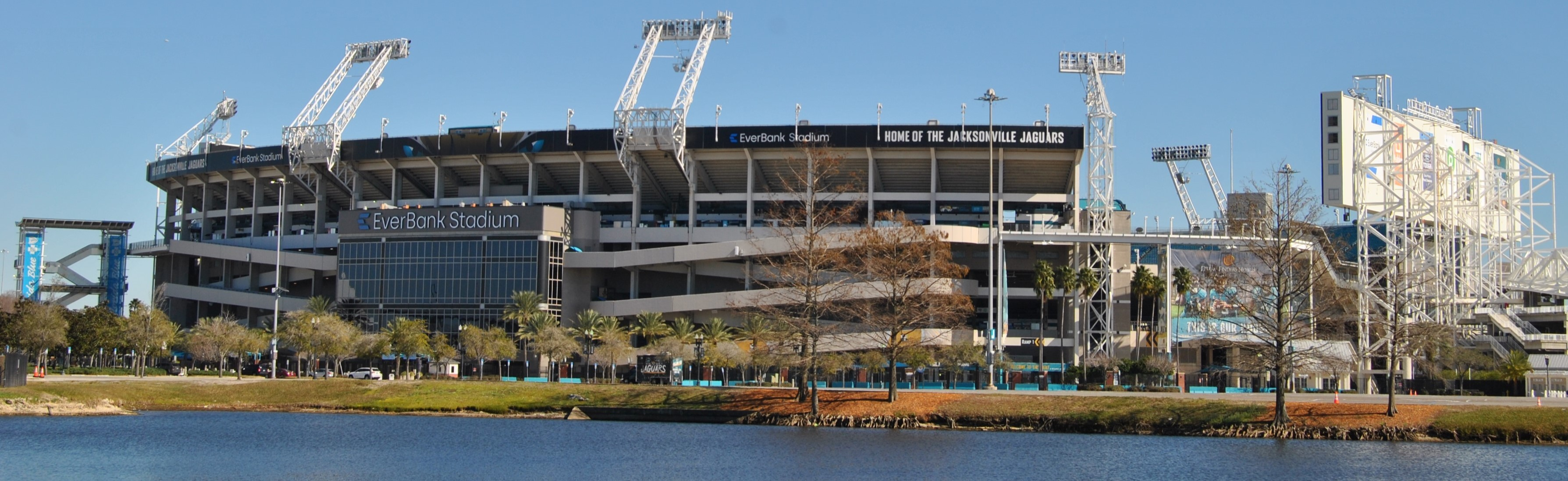
EverBank Stadium

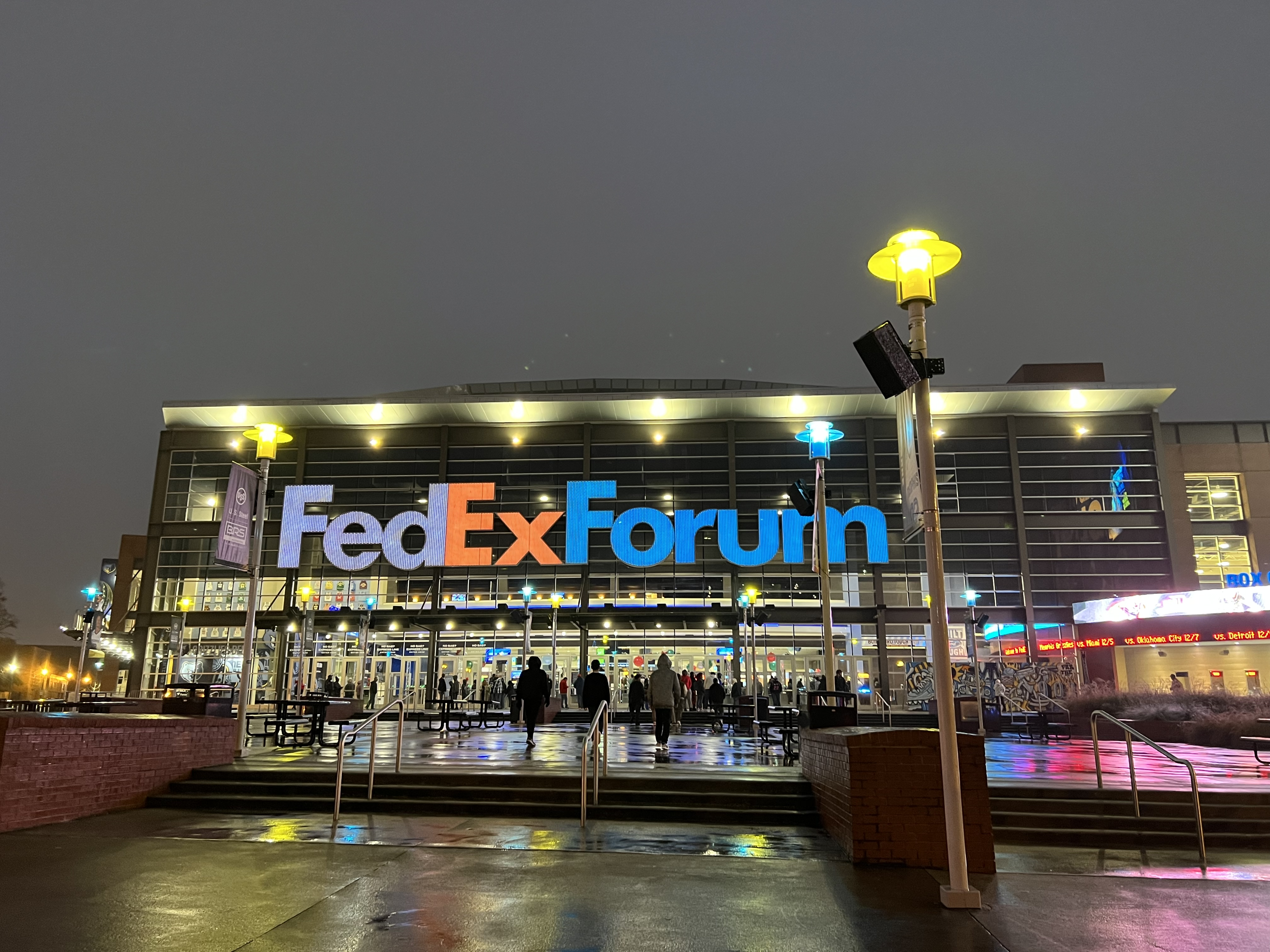
FedExForum

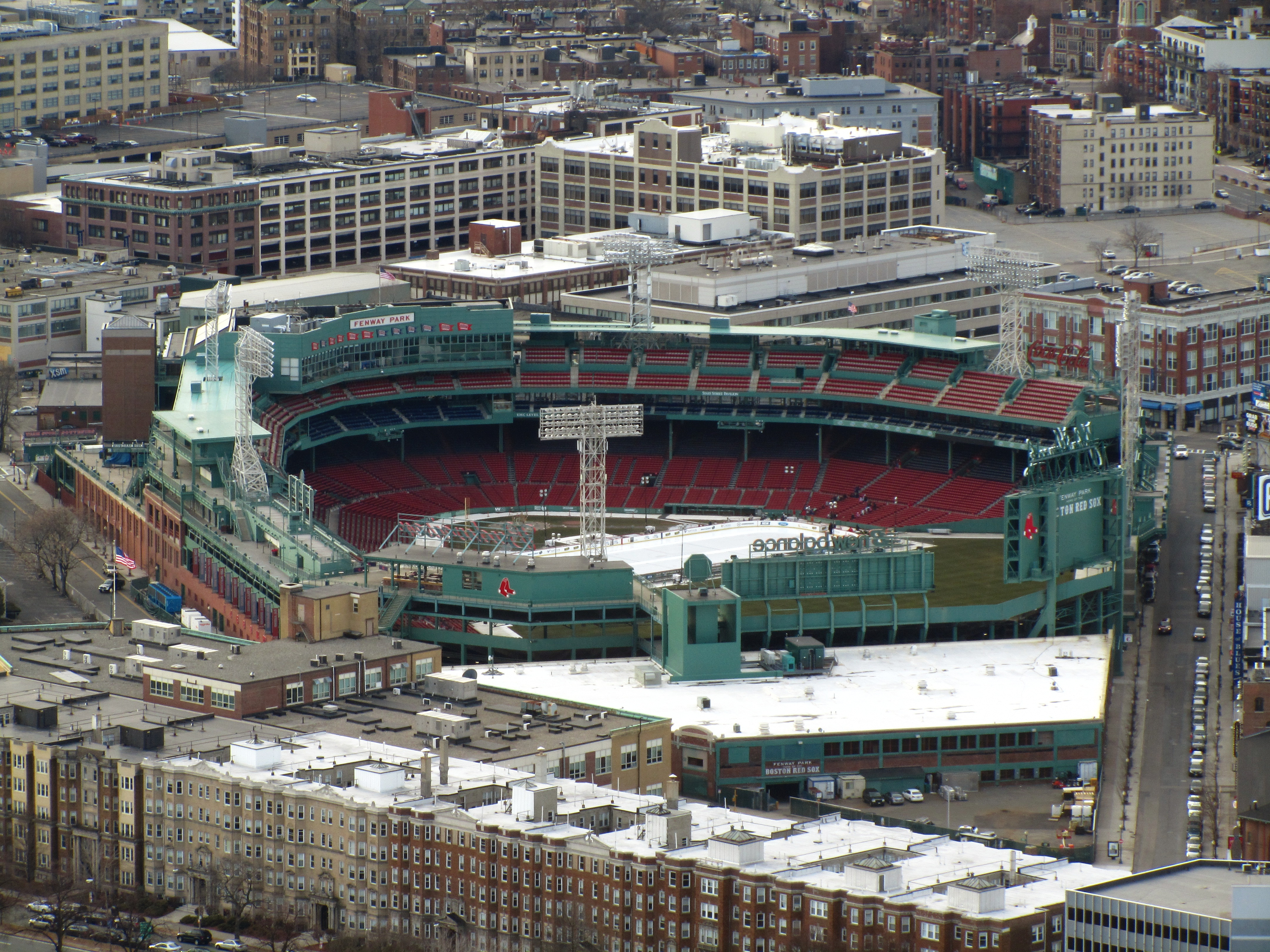
Fenway Park

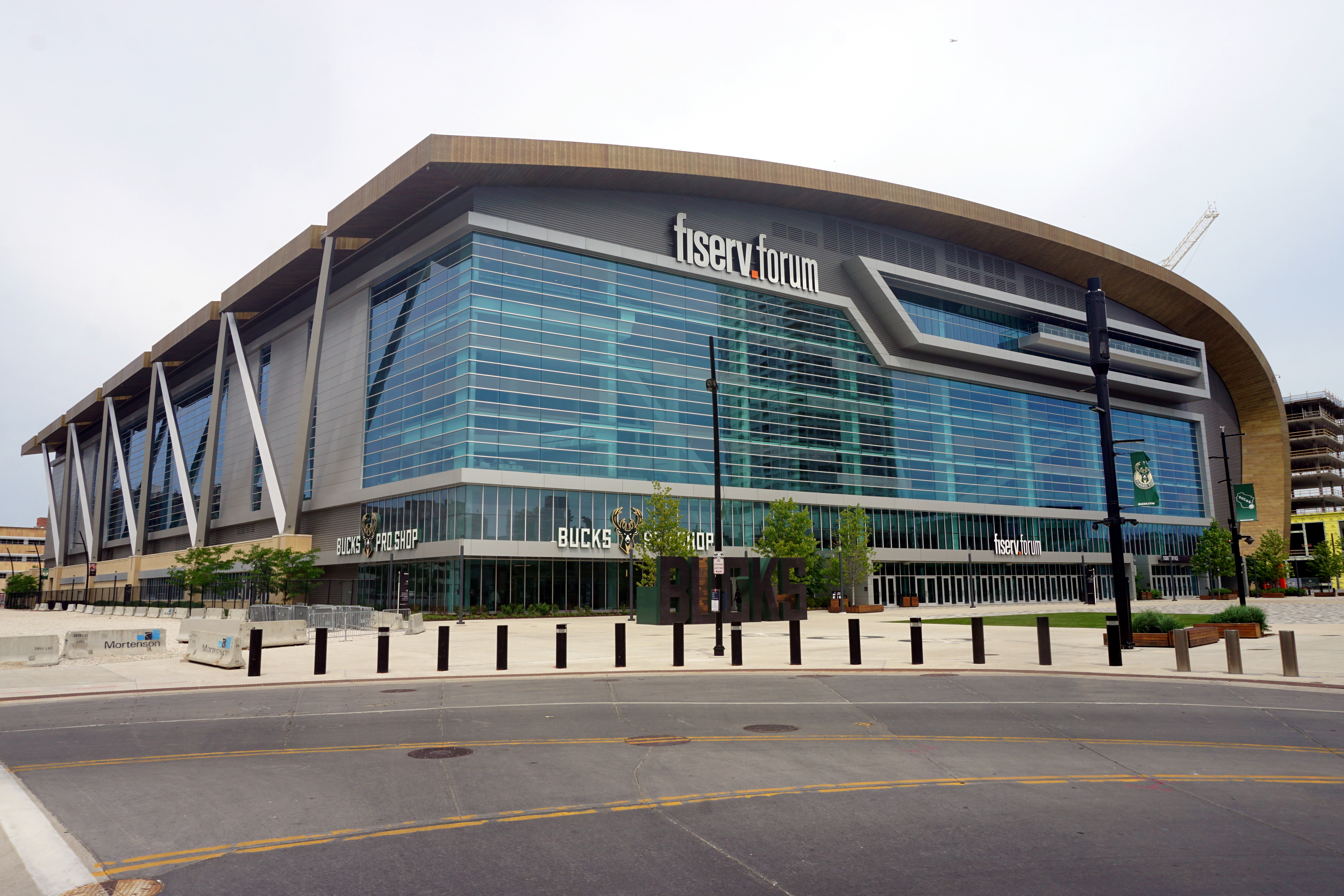
Fiserv Forum

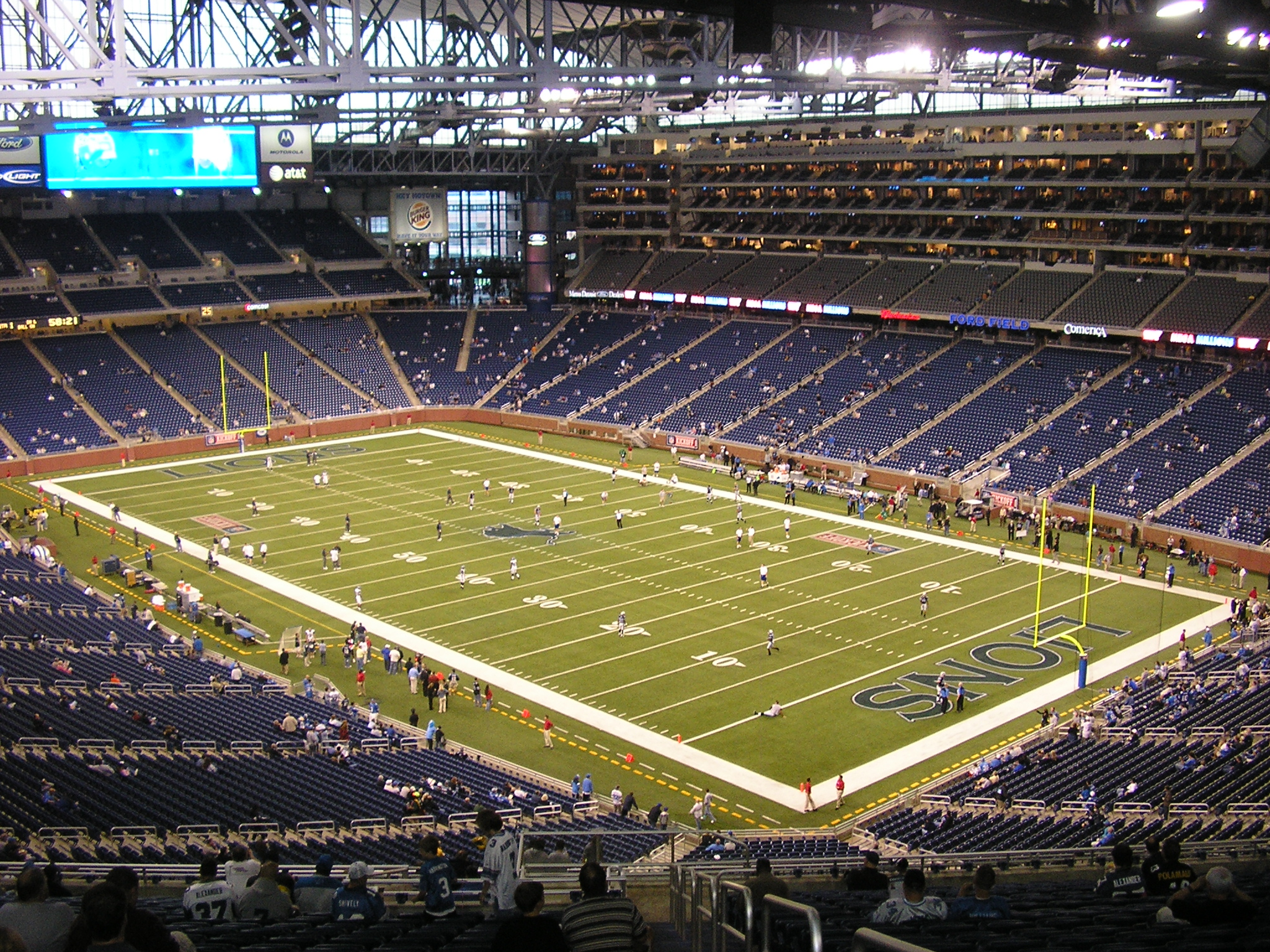
Ford Field

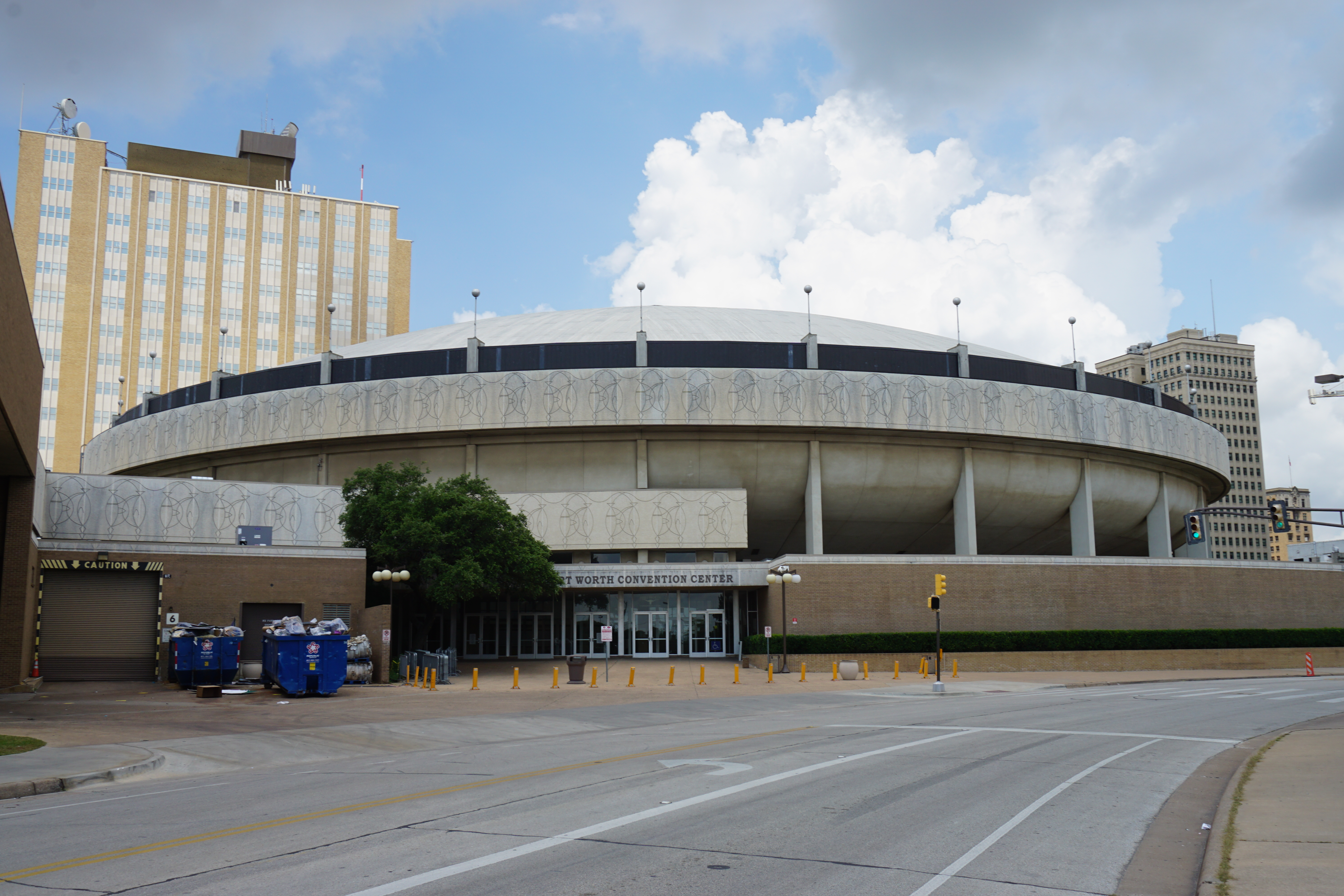
Fort Worth Convention Center

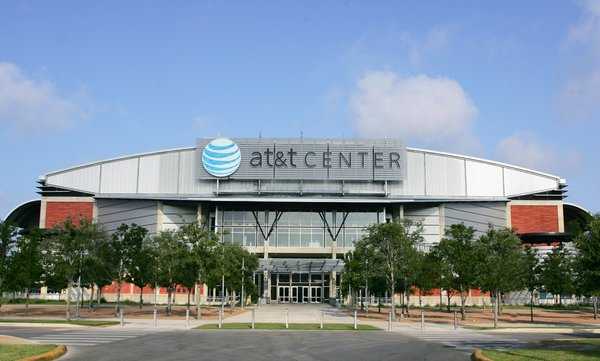
Frost Bank Center

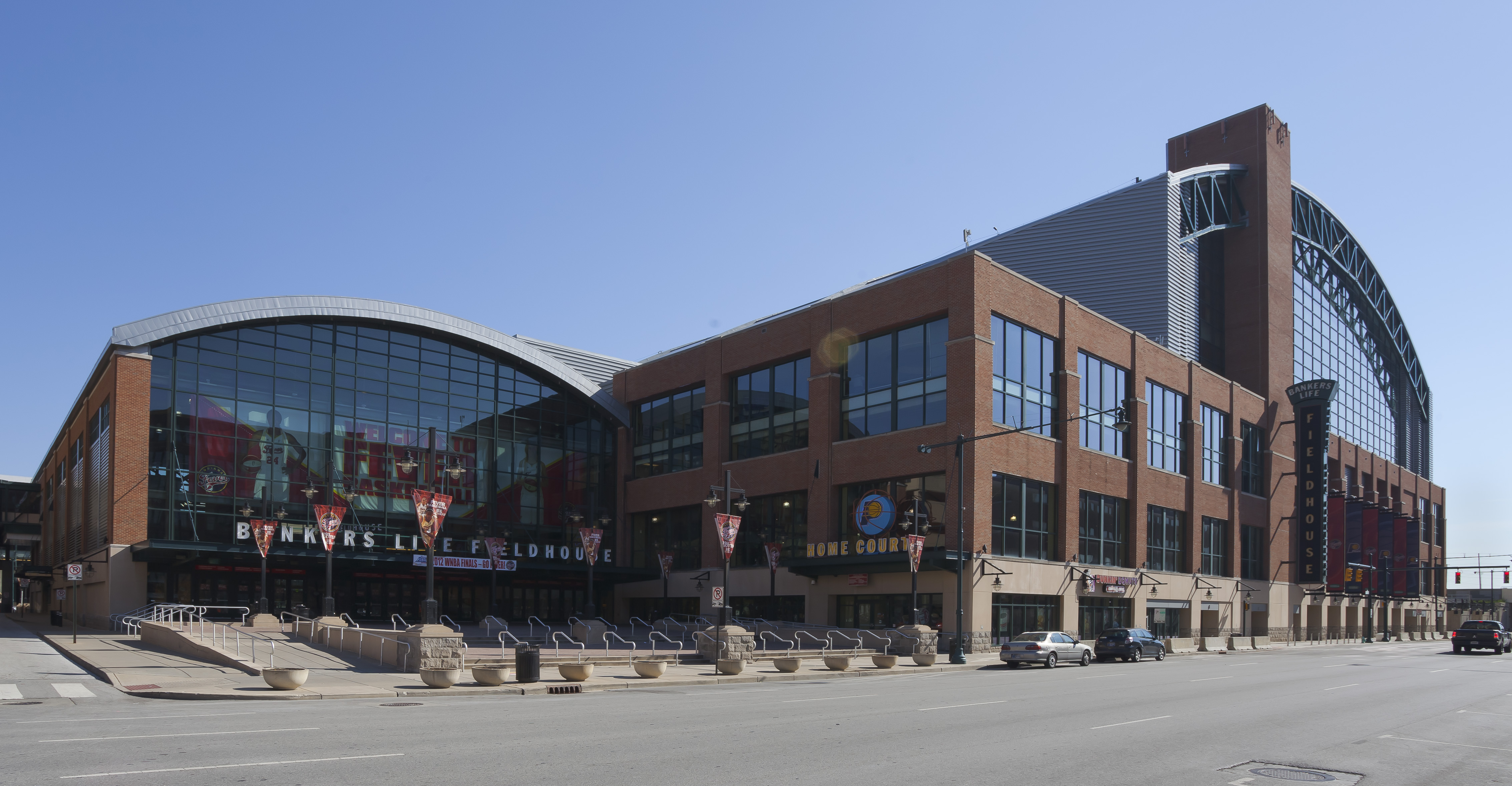
Gainbridge Fieldhouse

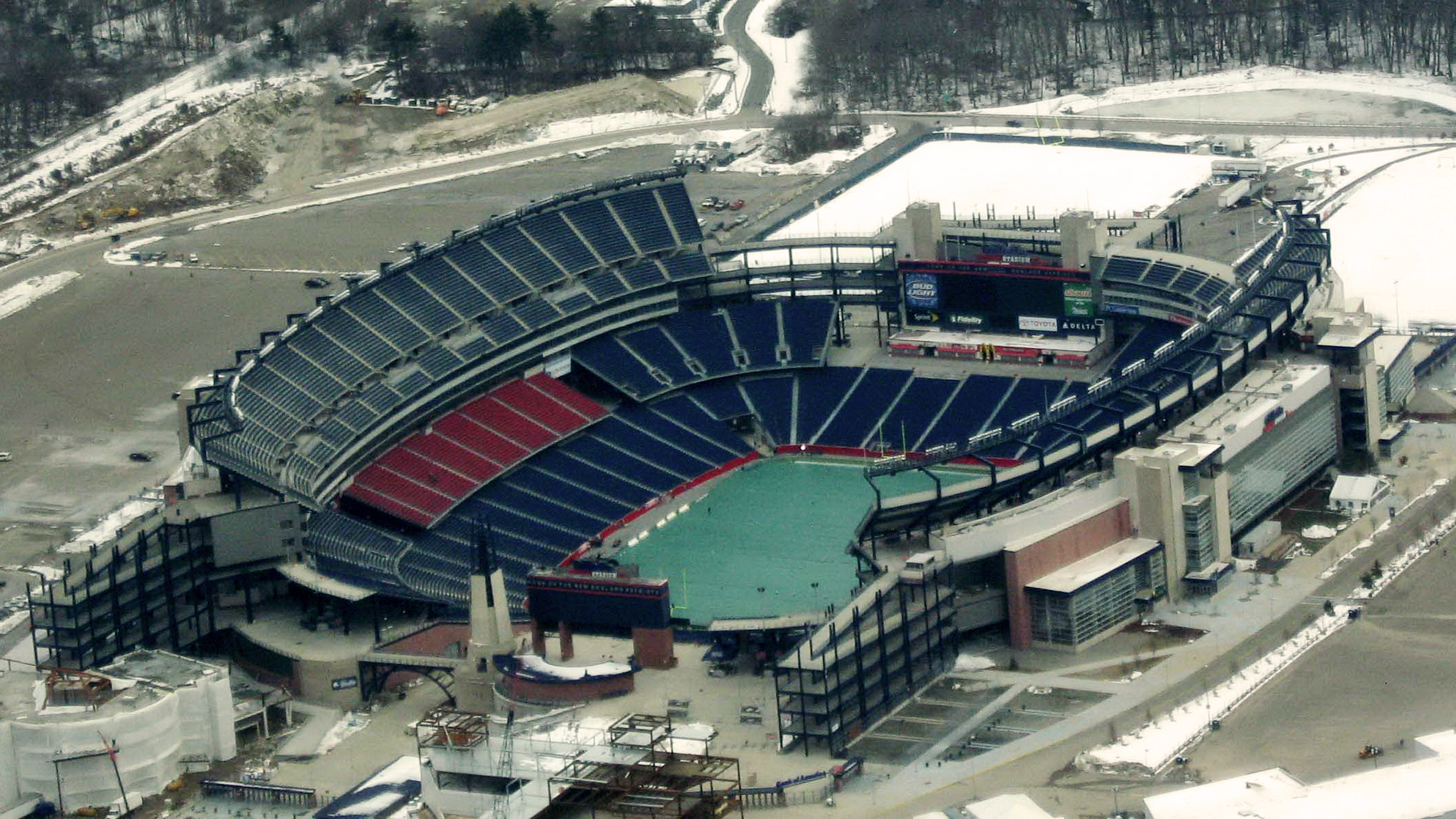
Gillette Stadium

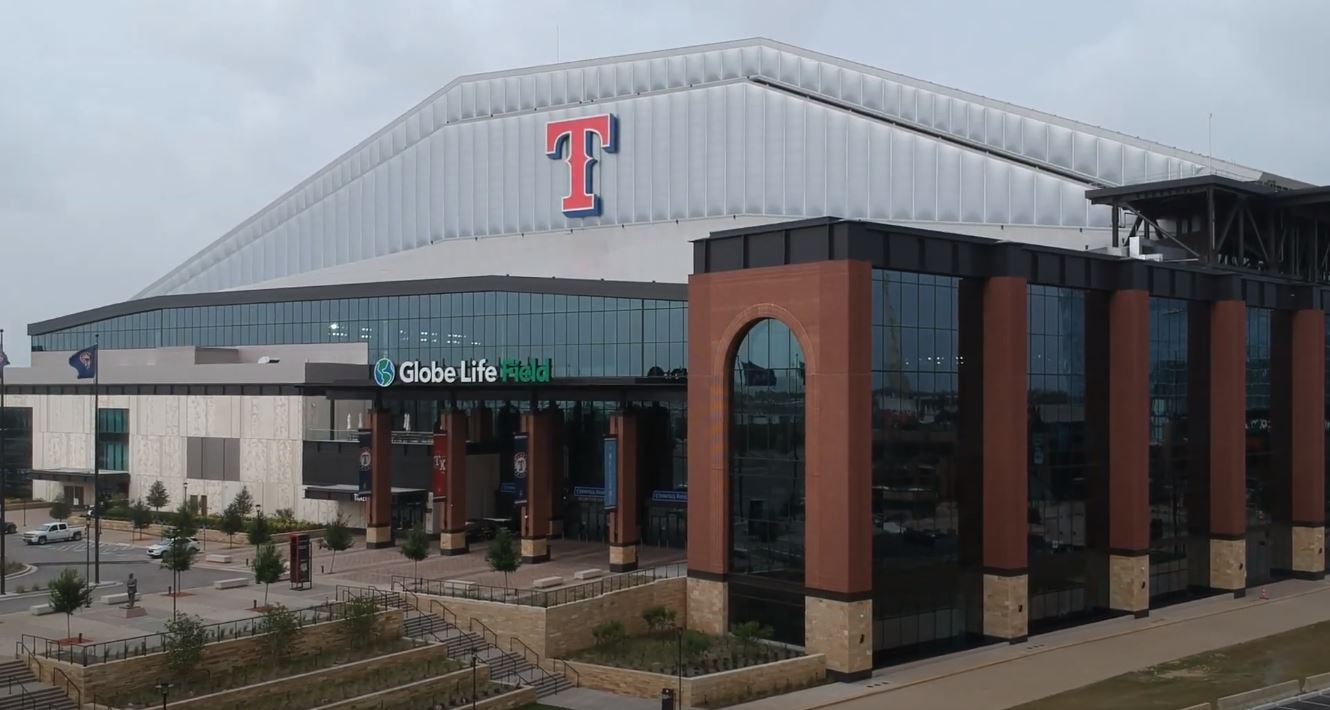
Globe Life Field

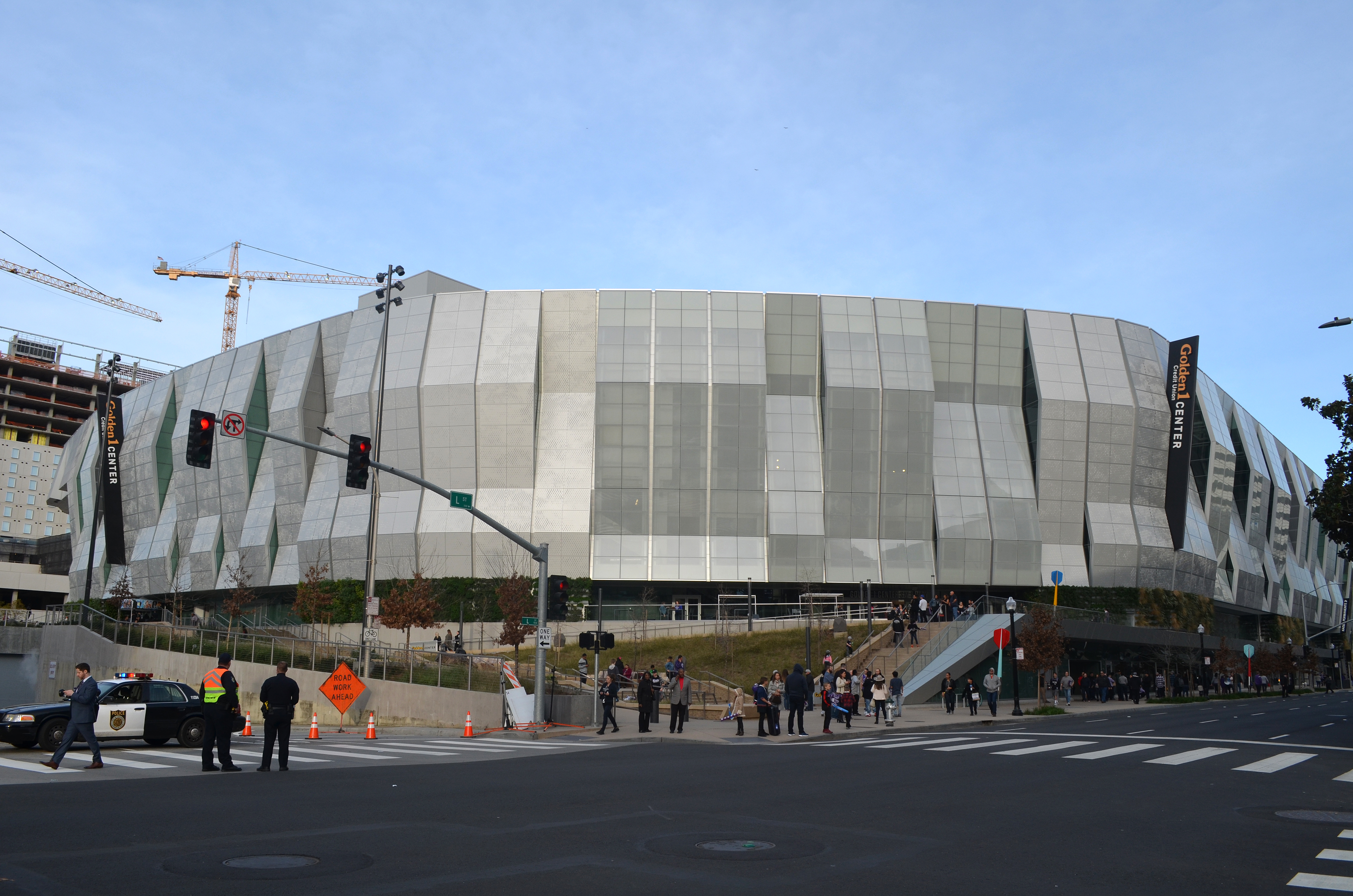
Golden 1 Center

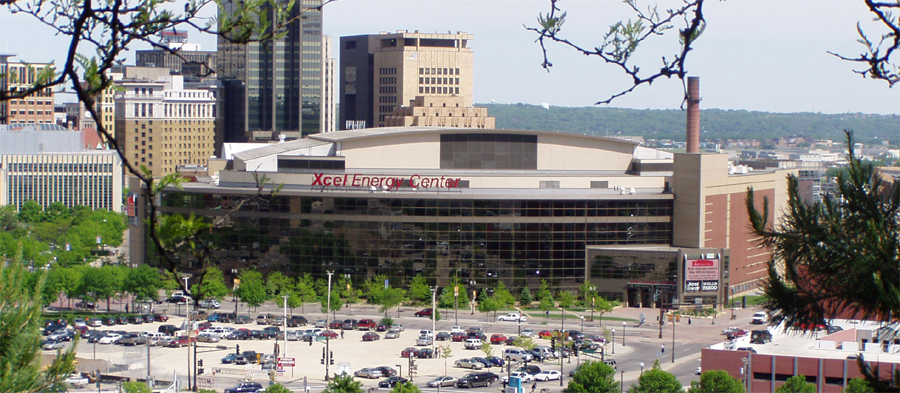
Grand Casino Arena

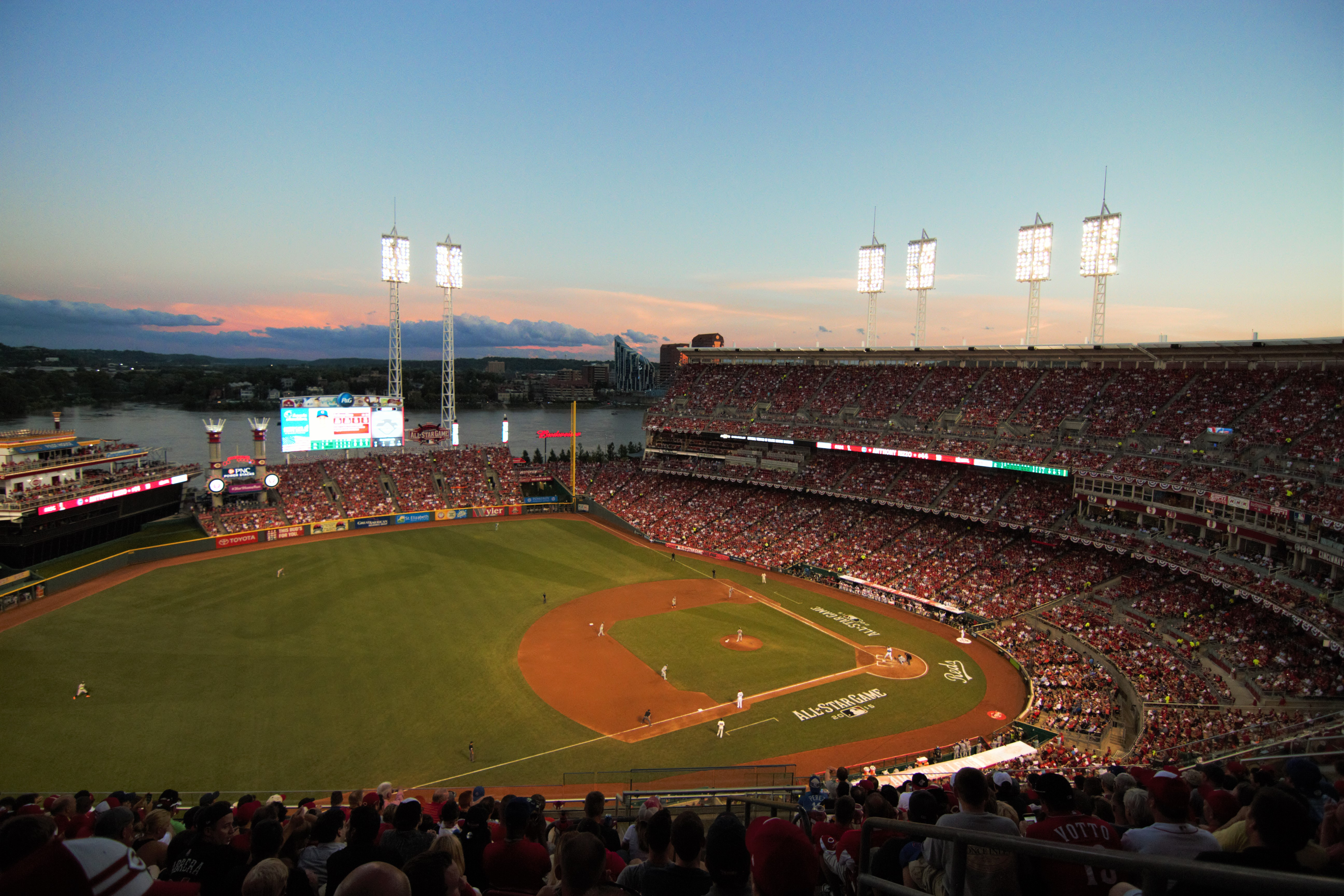
Great American Ball Park

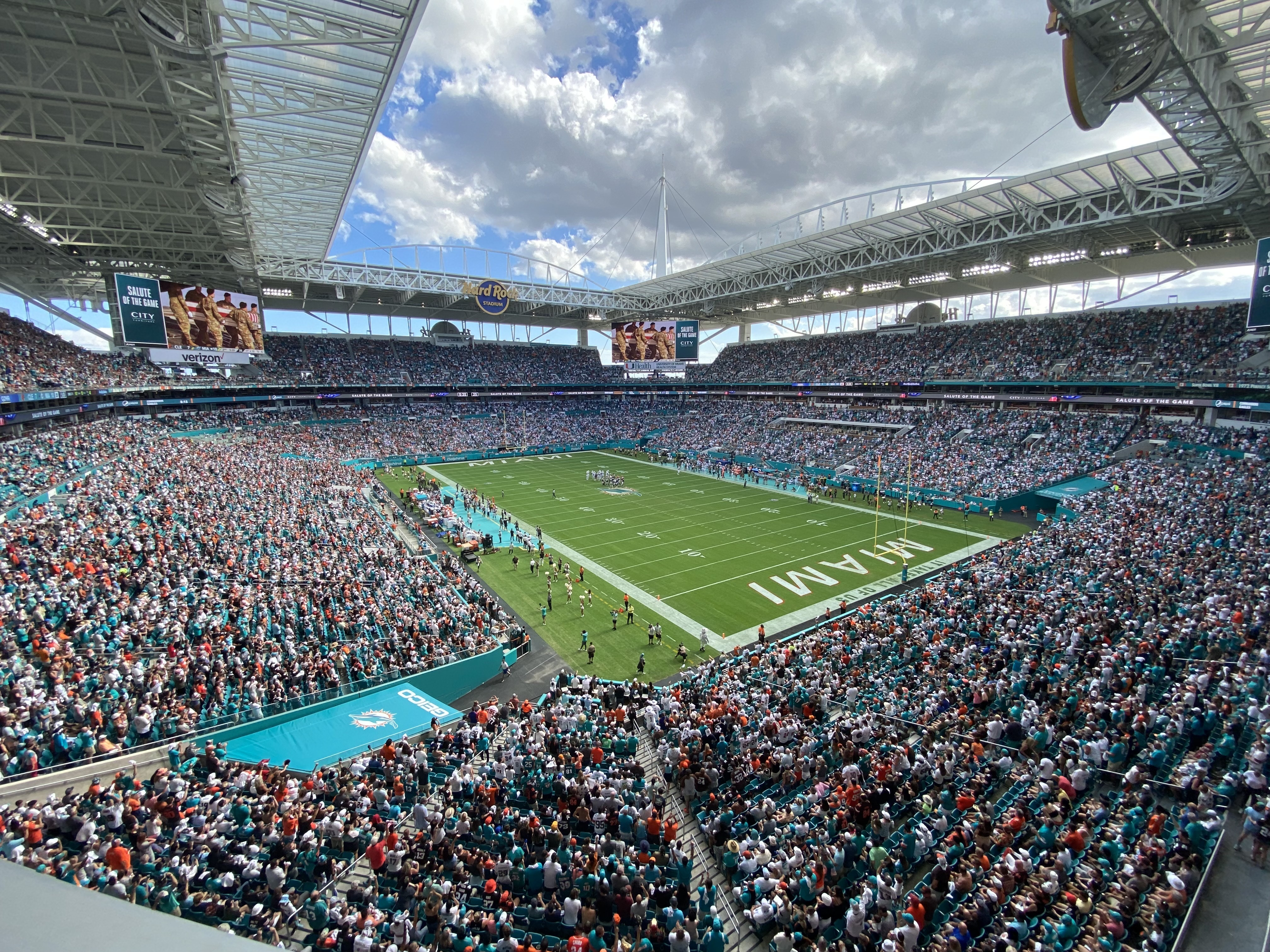
Hard Rock Stadium

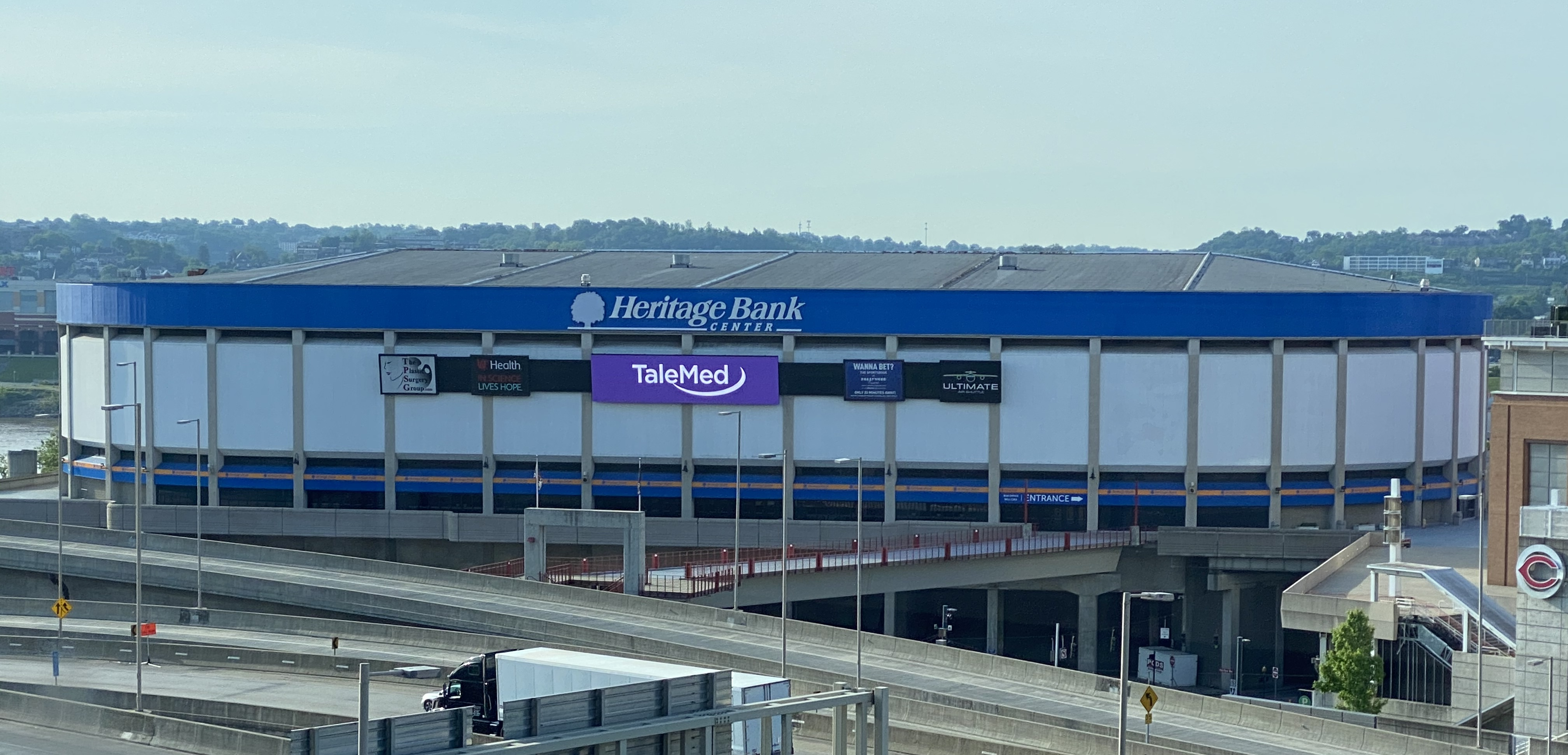
Heritage Bank Center

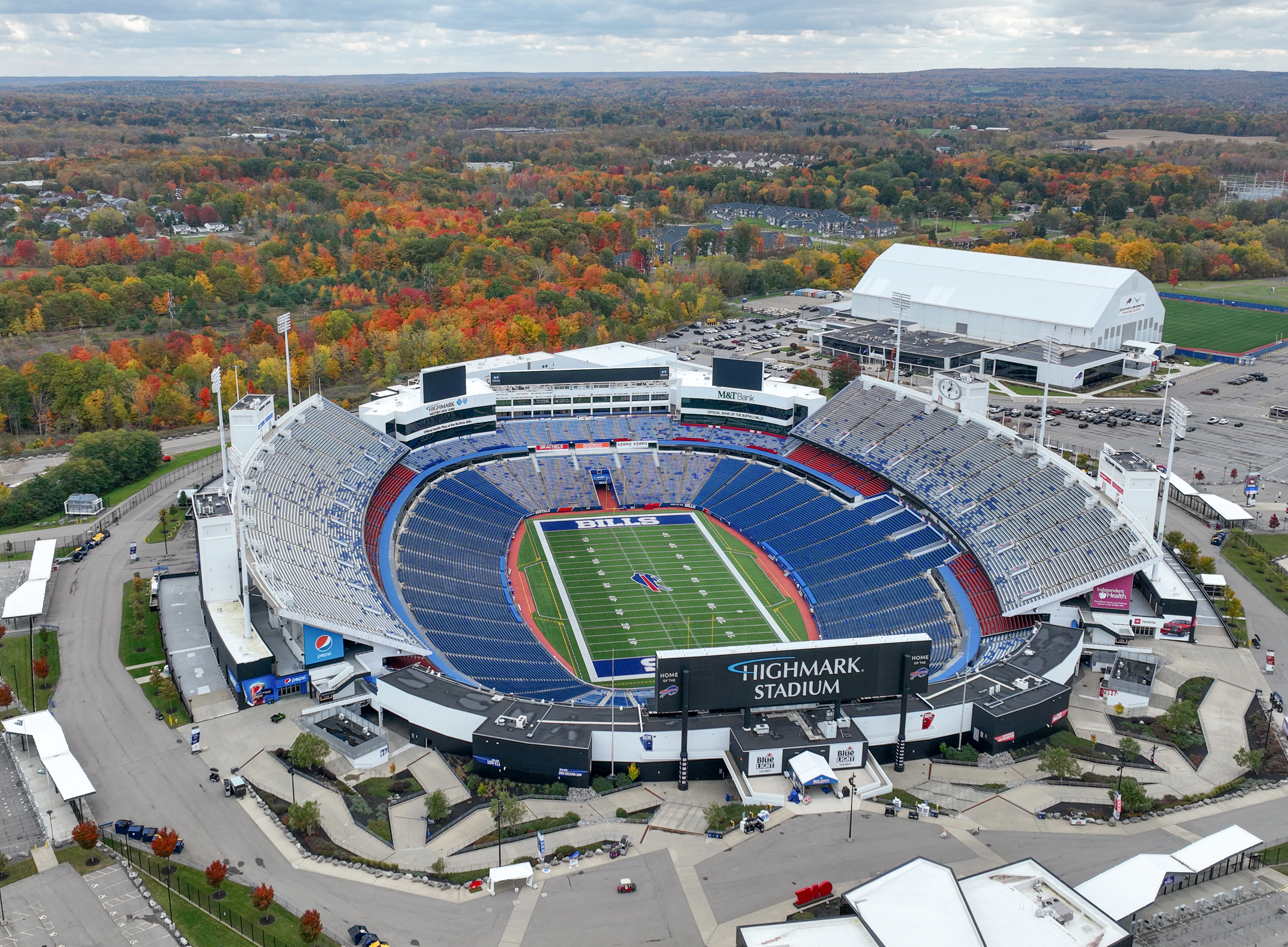
Highmark Stadium

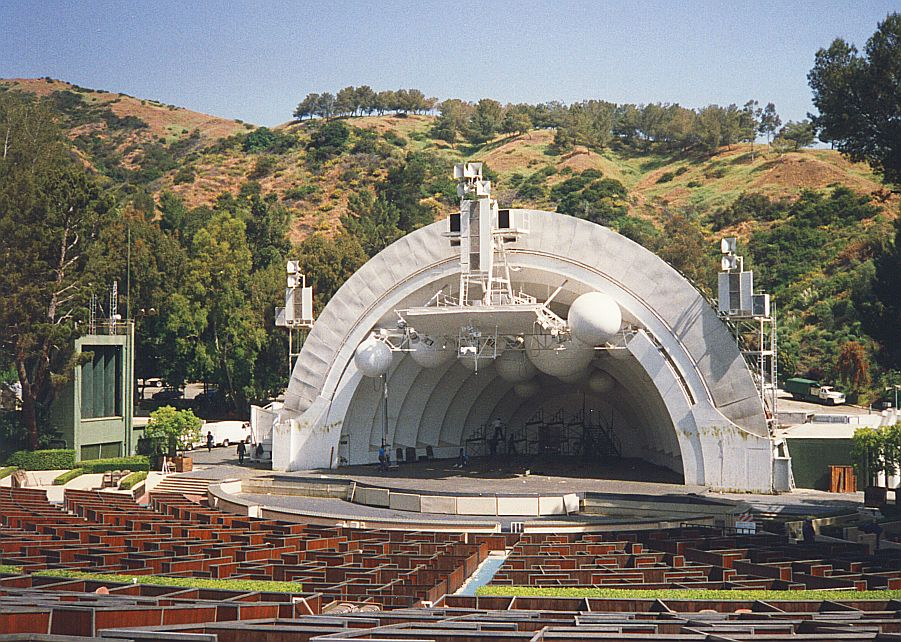
Hollywood Bowl

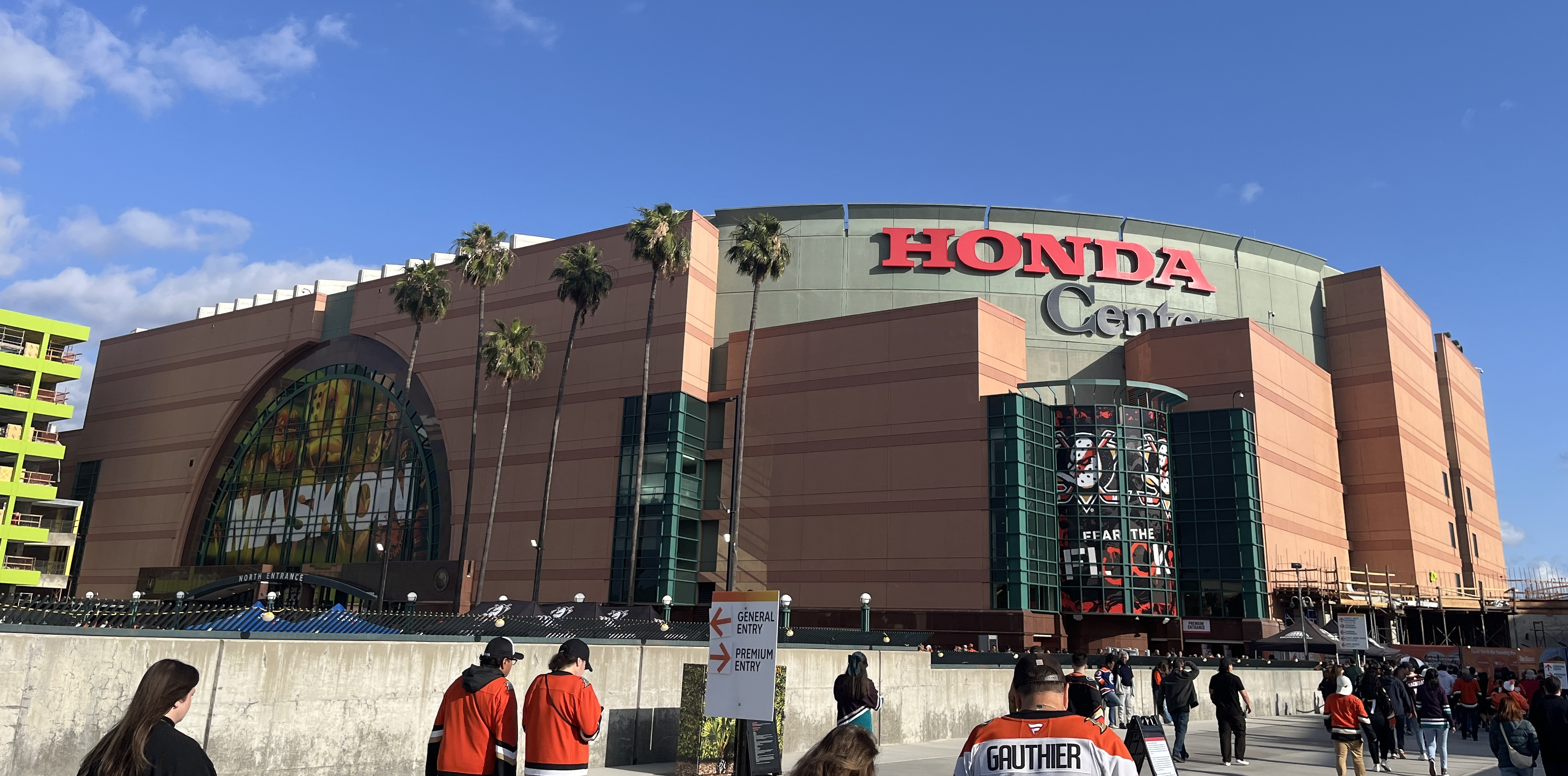
Honda Center

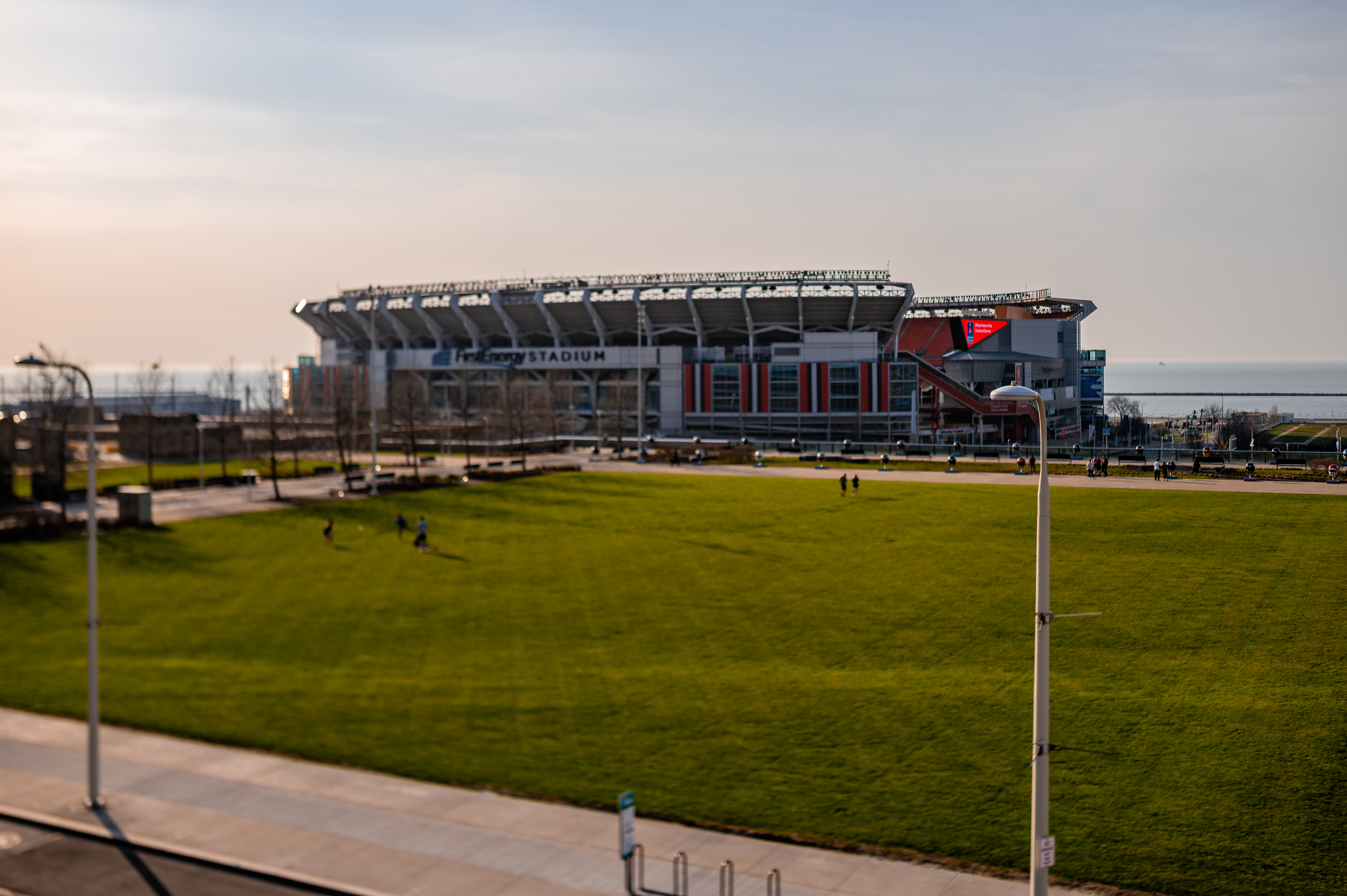
Huntington Bank Field

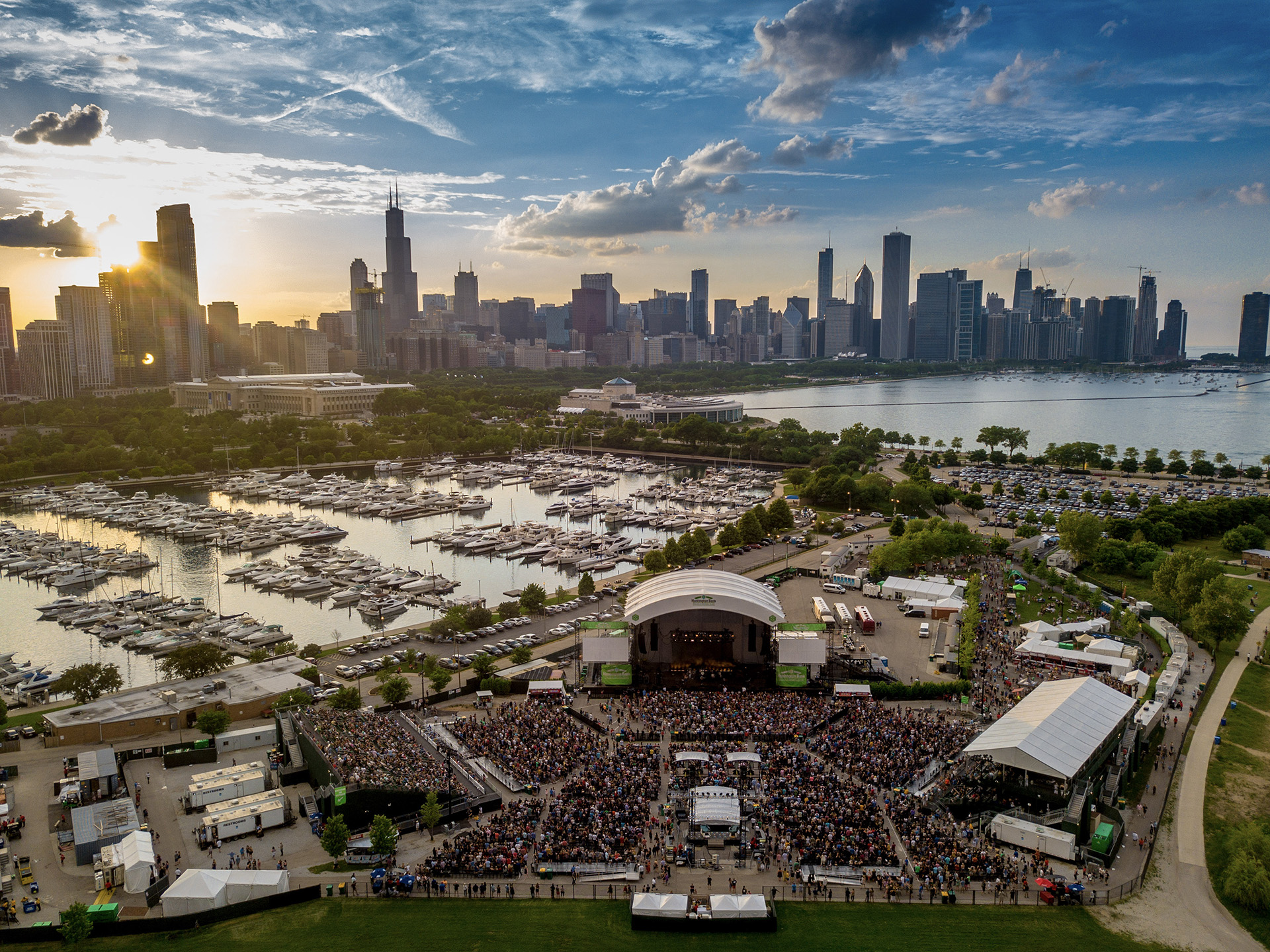
Huntington Bank Pavilion

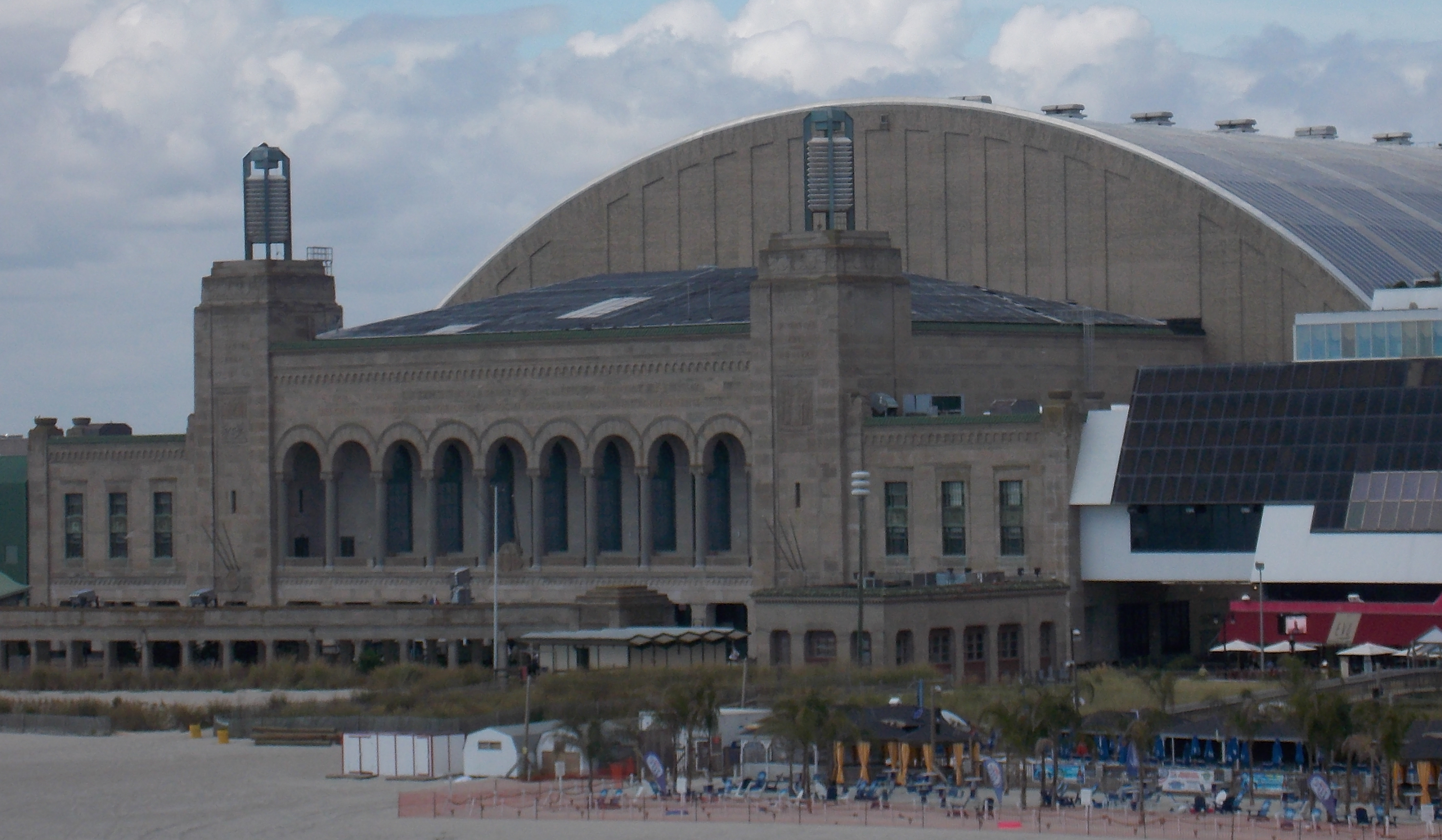
Jim Whelan Boardwalk Hall

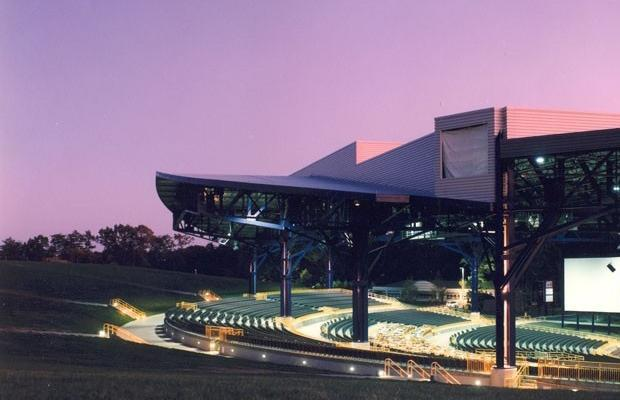
Jiffy Lube Live

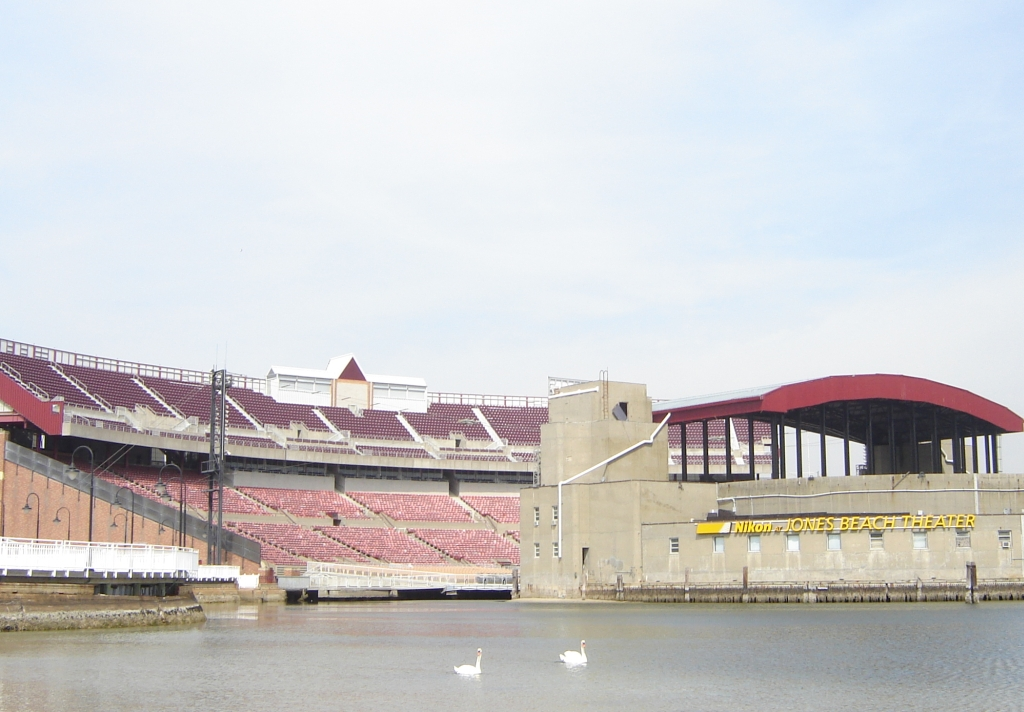
Jones Beach Theater

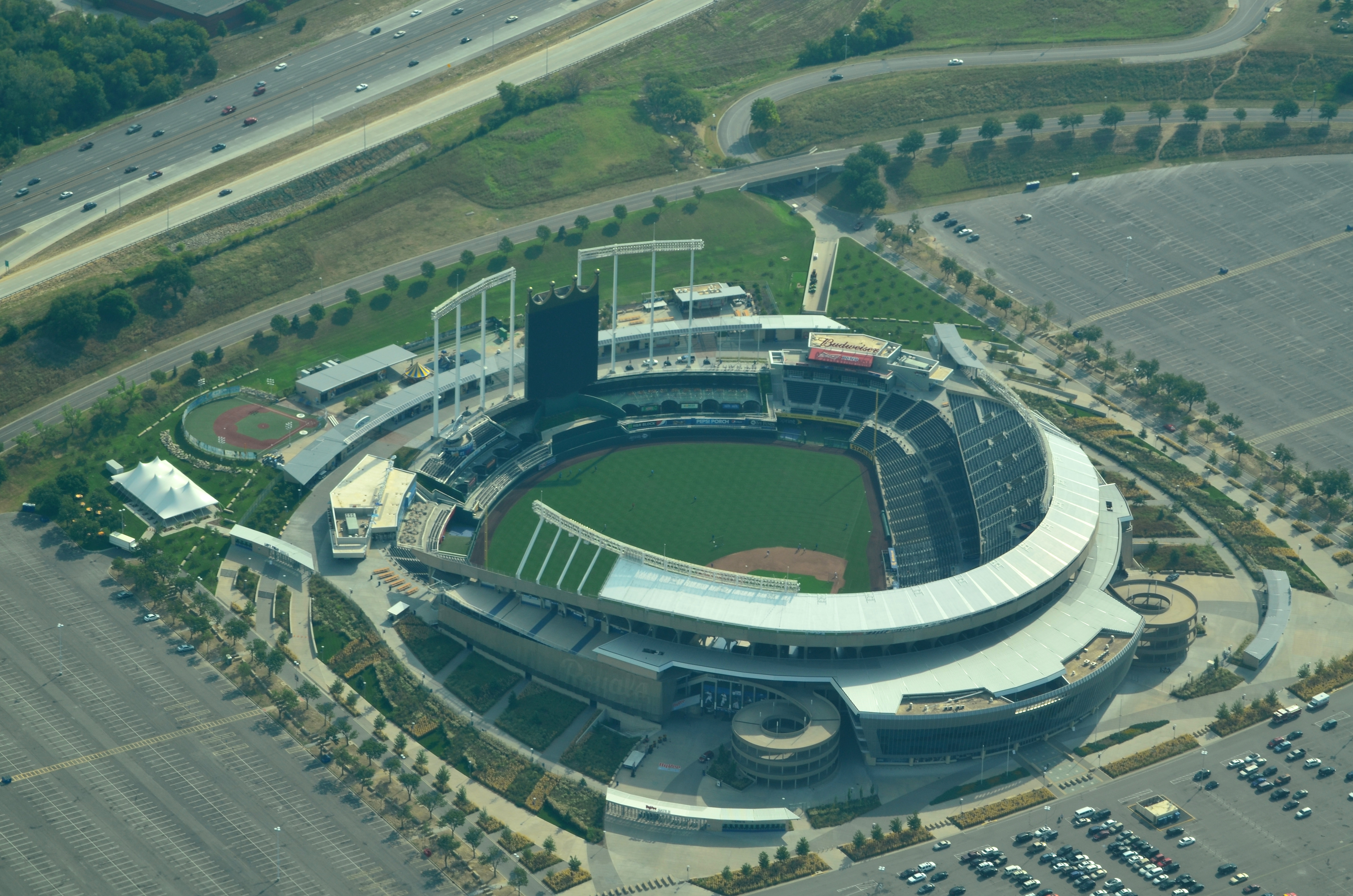
Kauffman Stadium

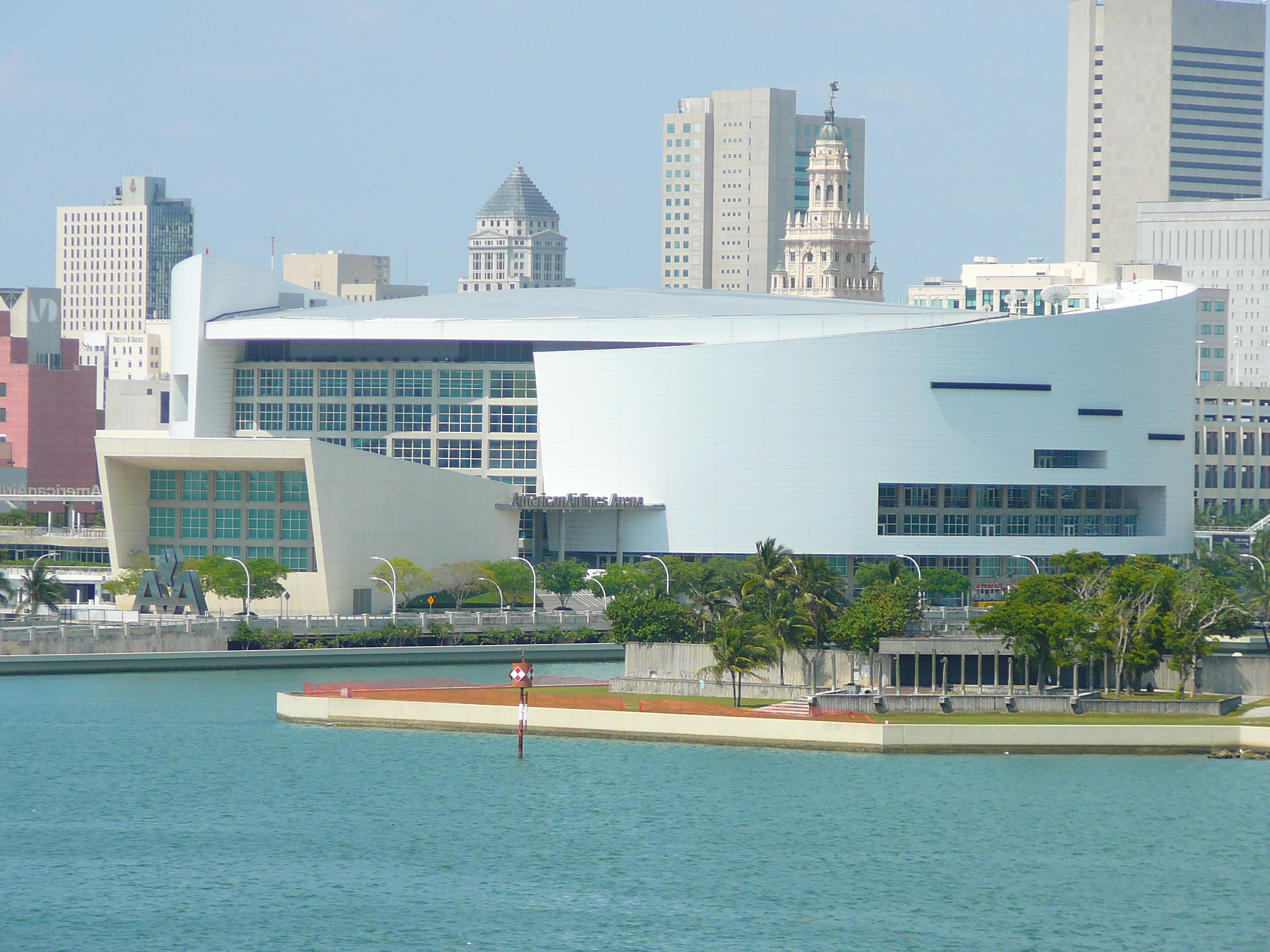
Kaseya Center

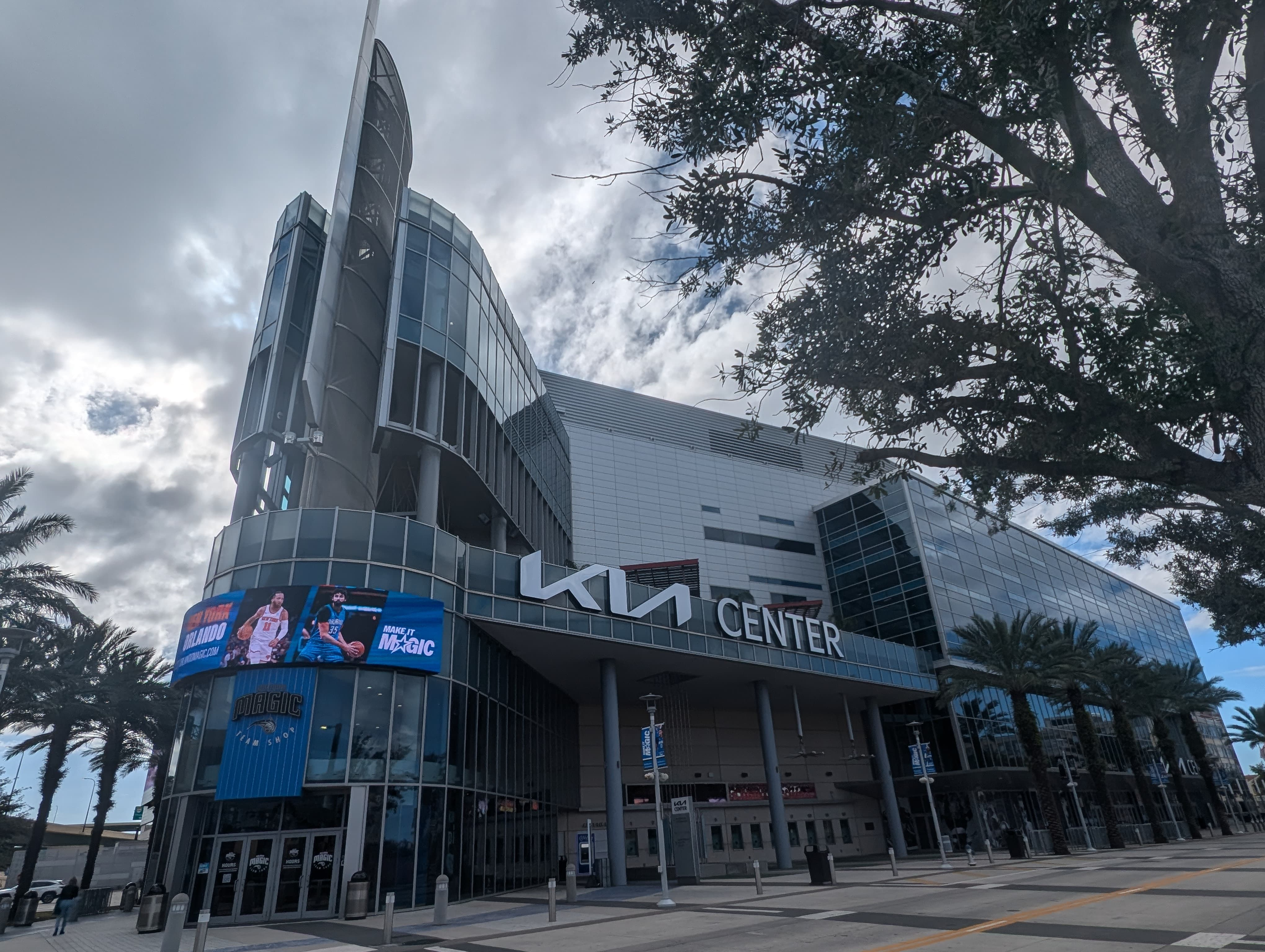
Kia Center

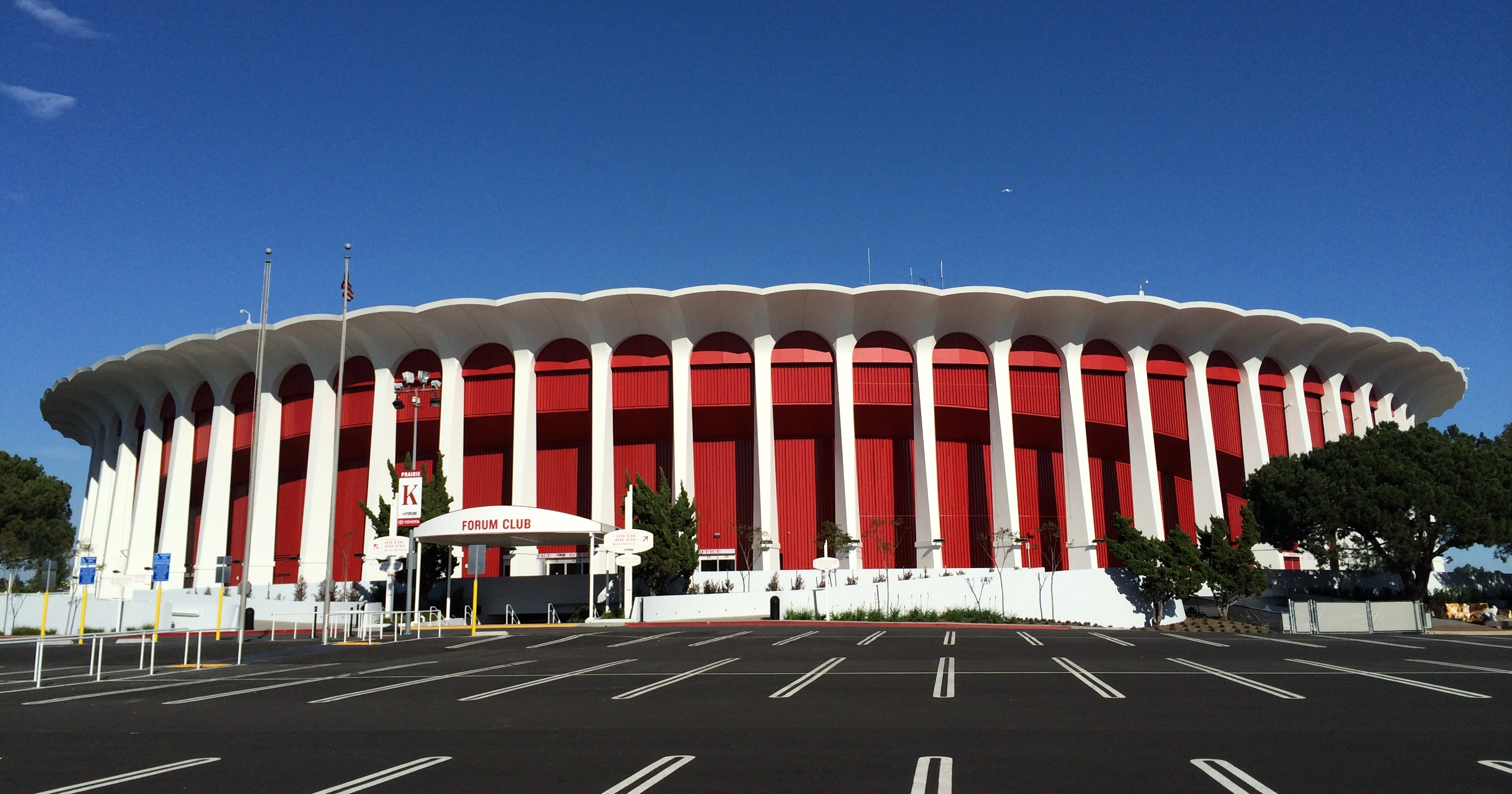
Kia Forum

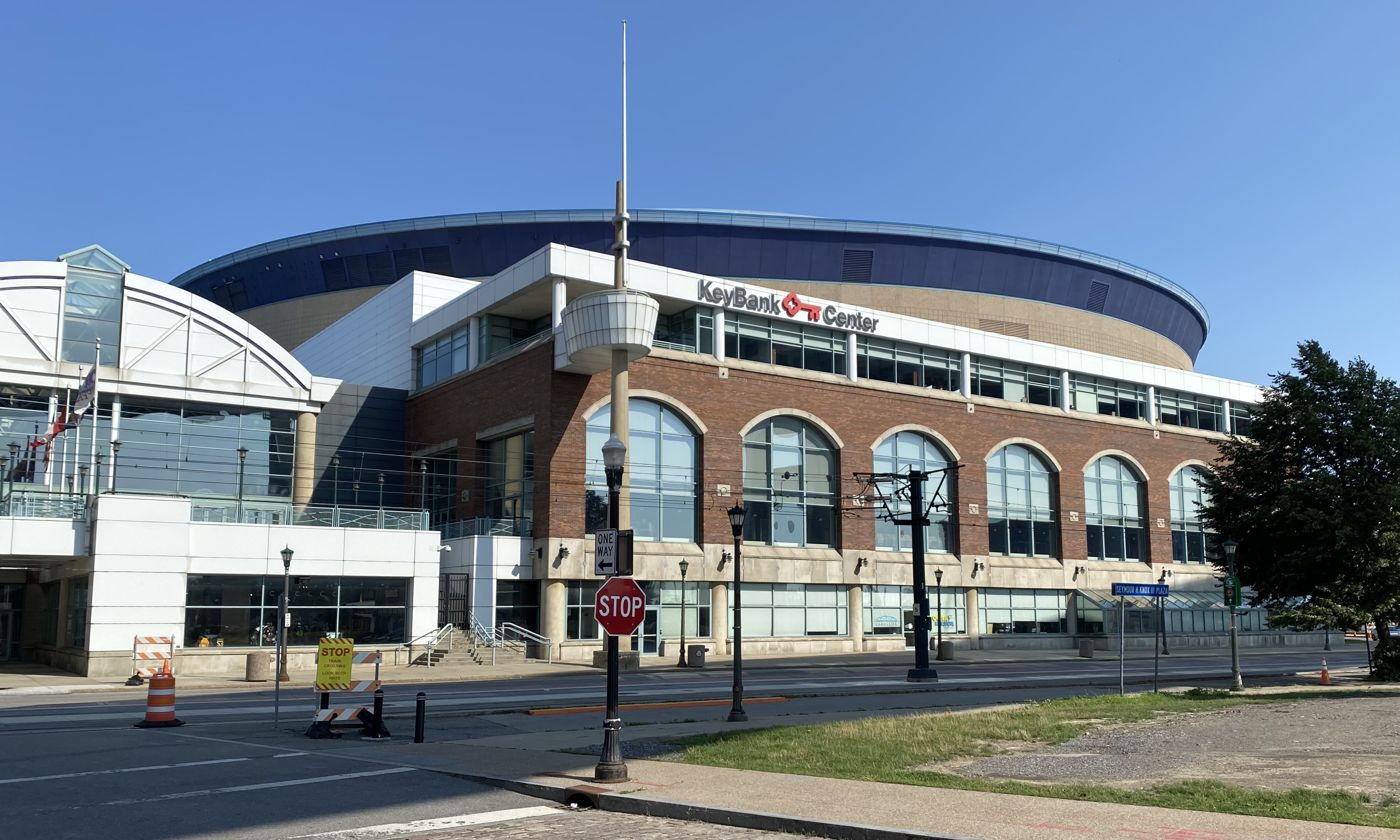
KeyBank Center

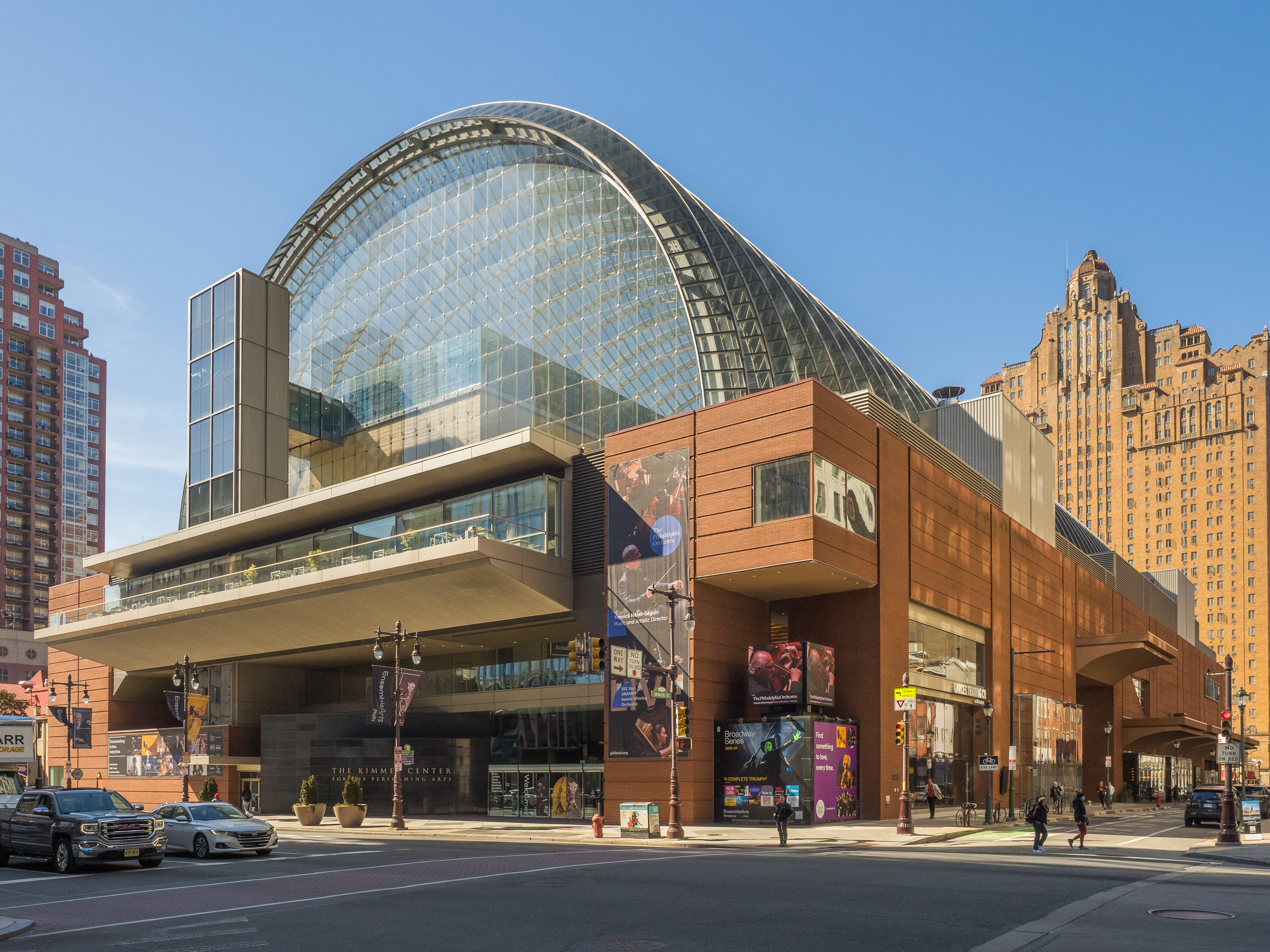
Kimmel Center for the Performing Arts

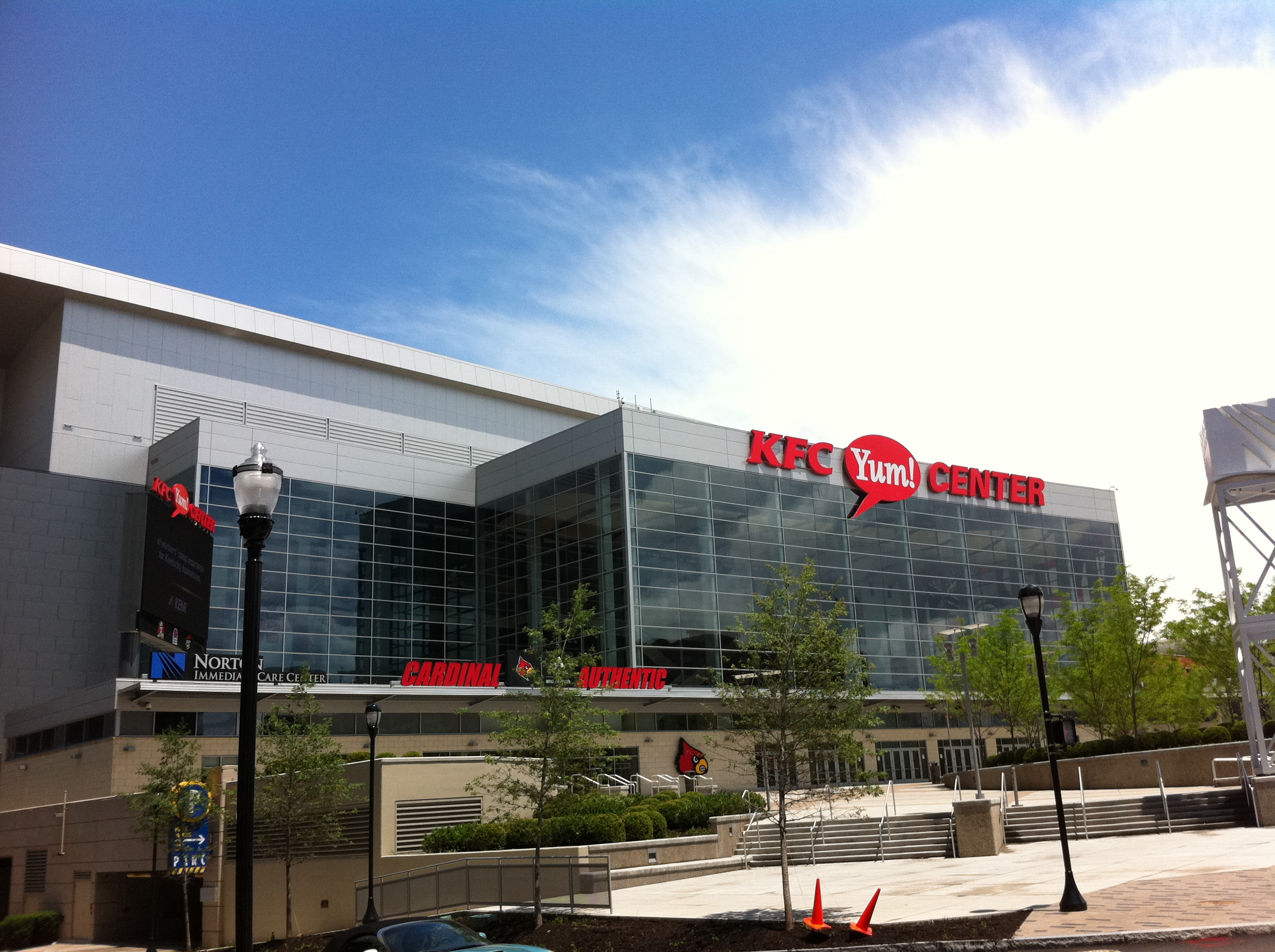
KFC Yum! Center

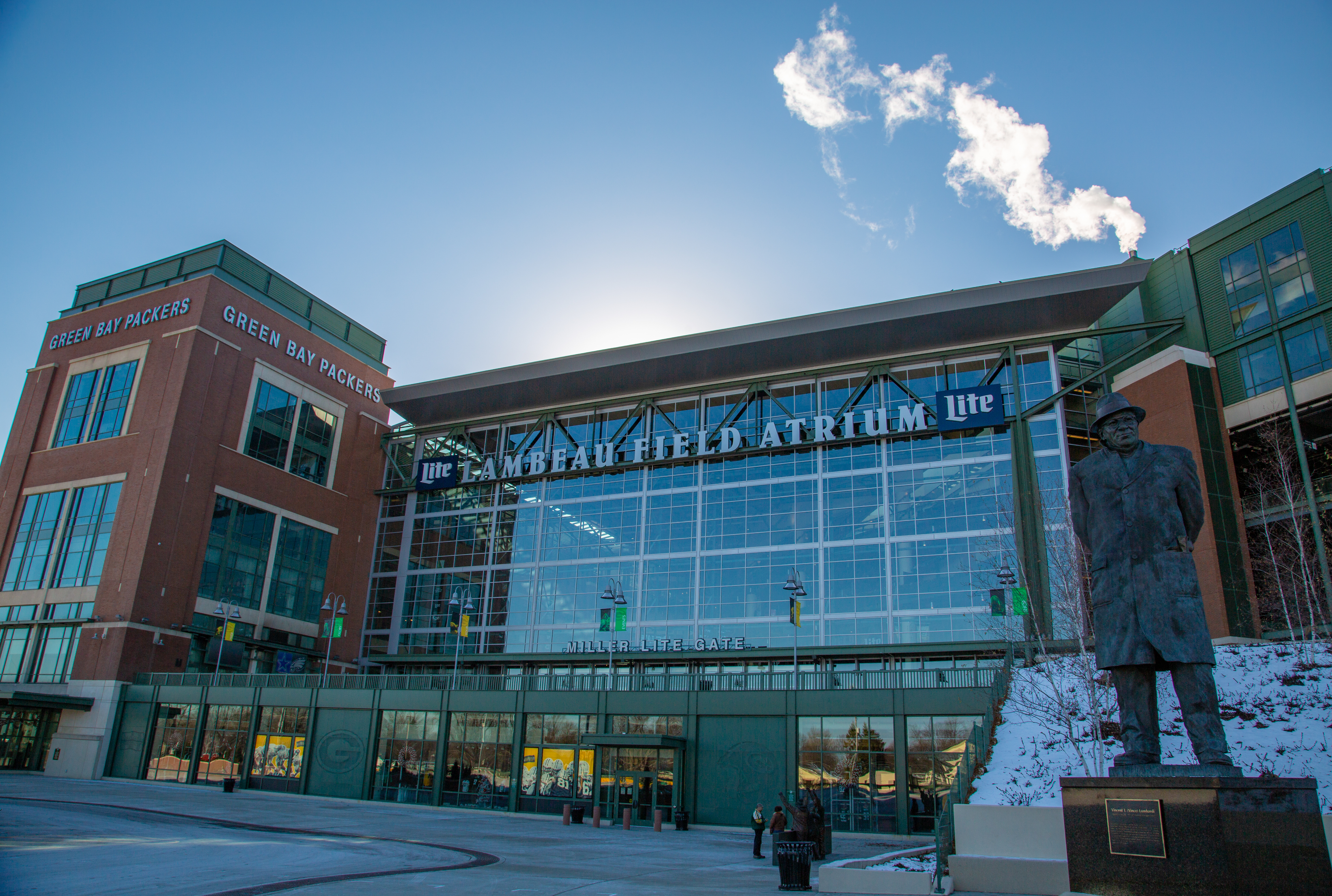
Lambeau Field

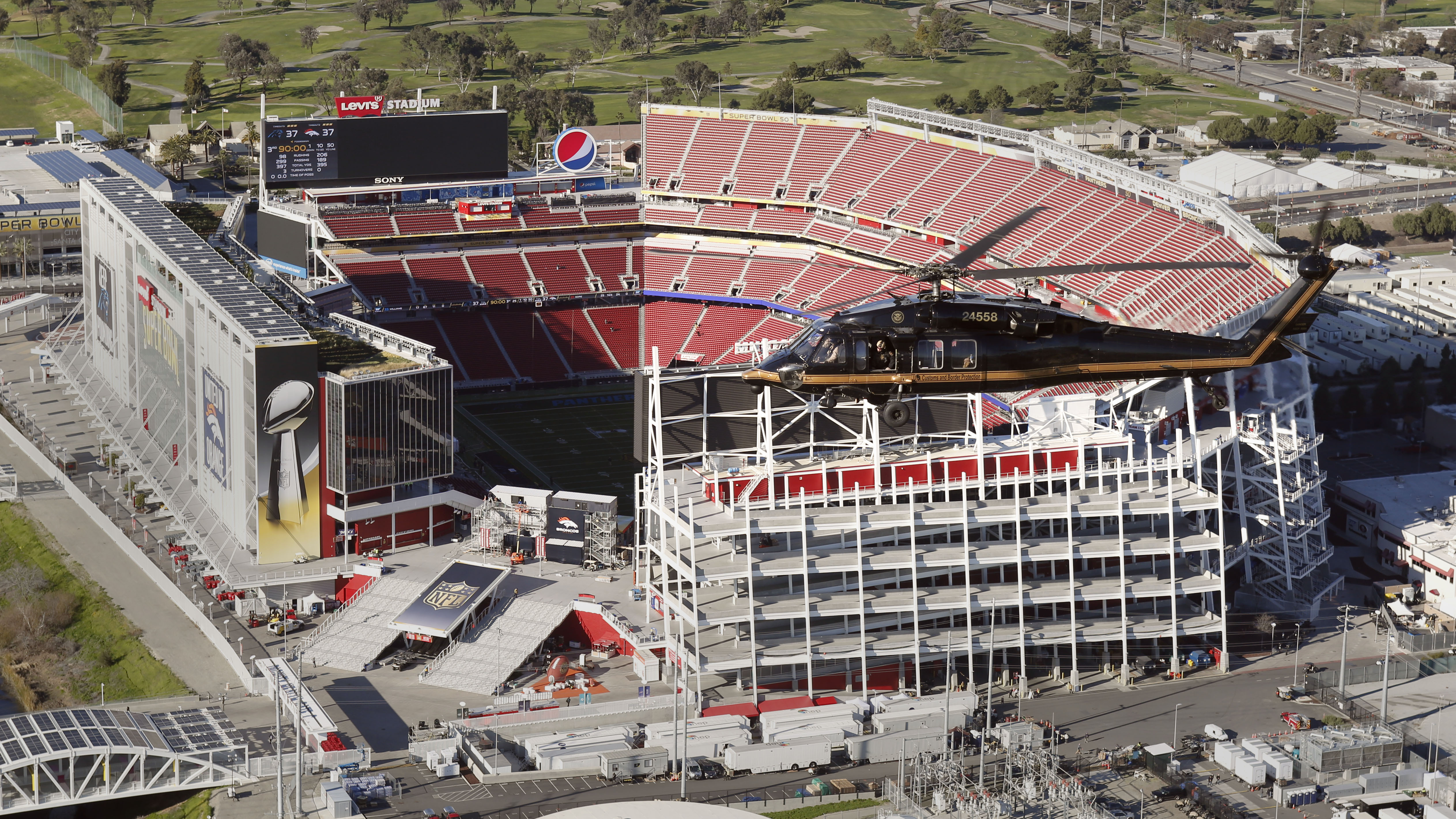
Levi's Stadium

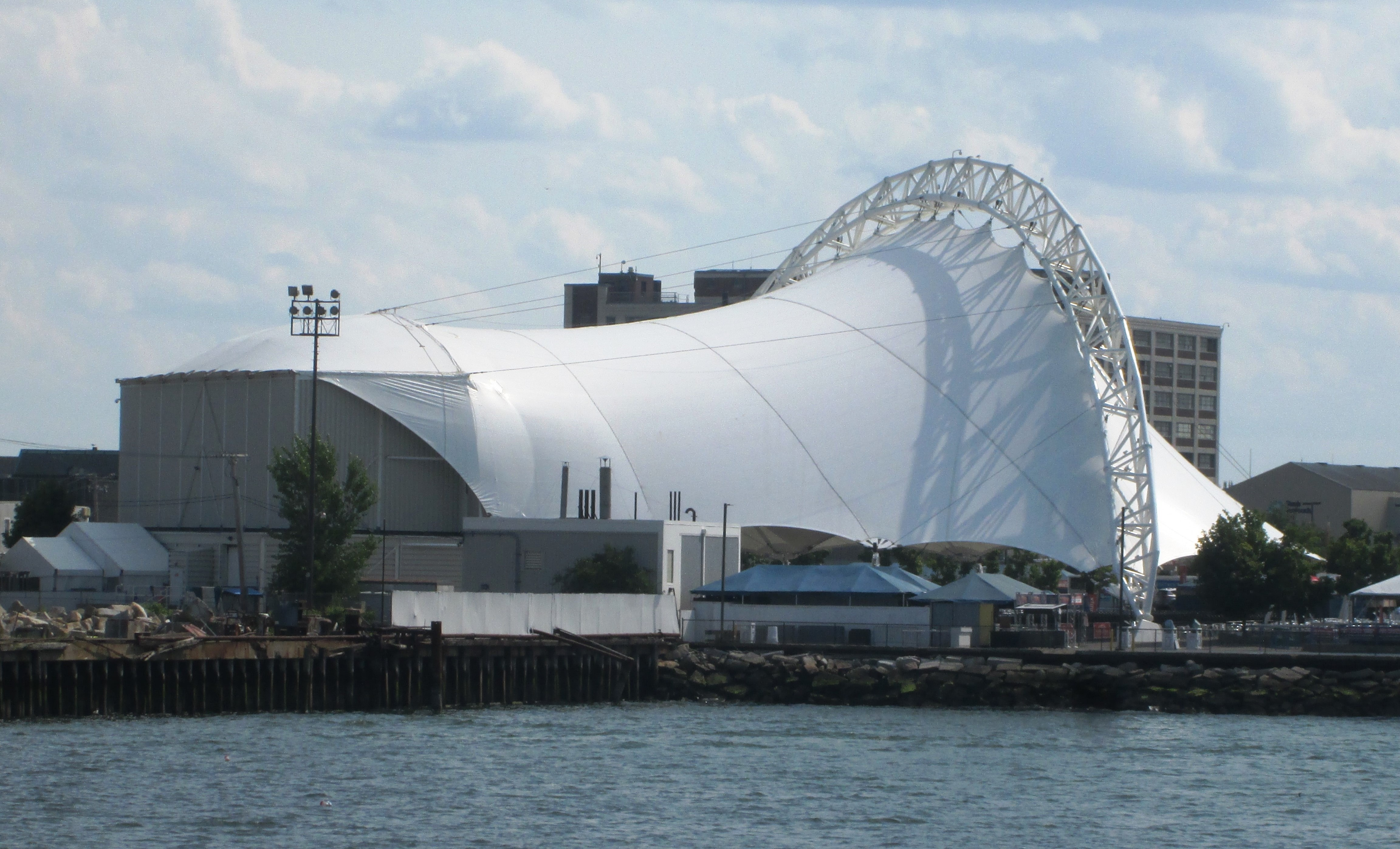
Leader Bank Pavilion

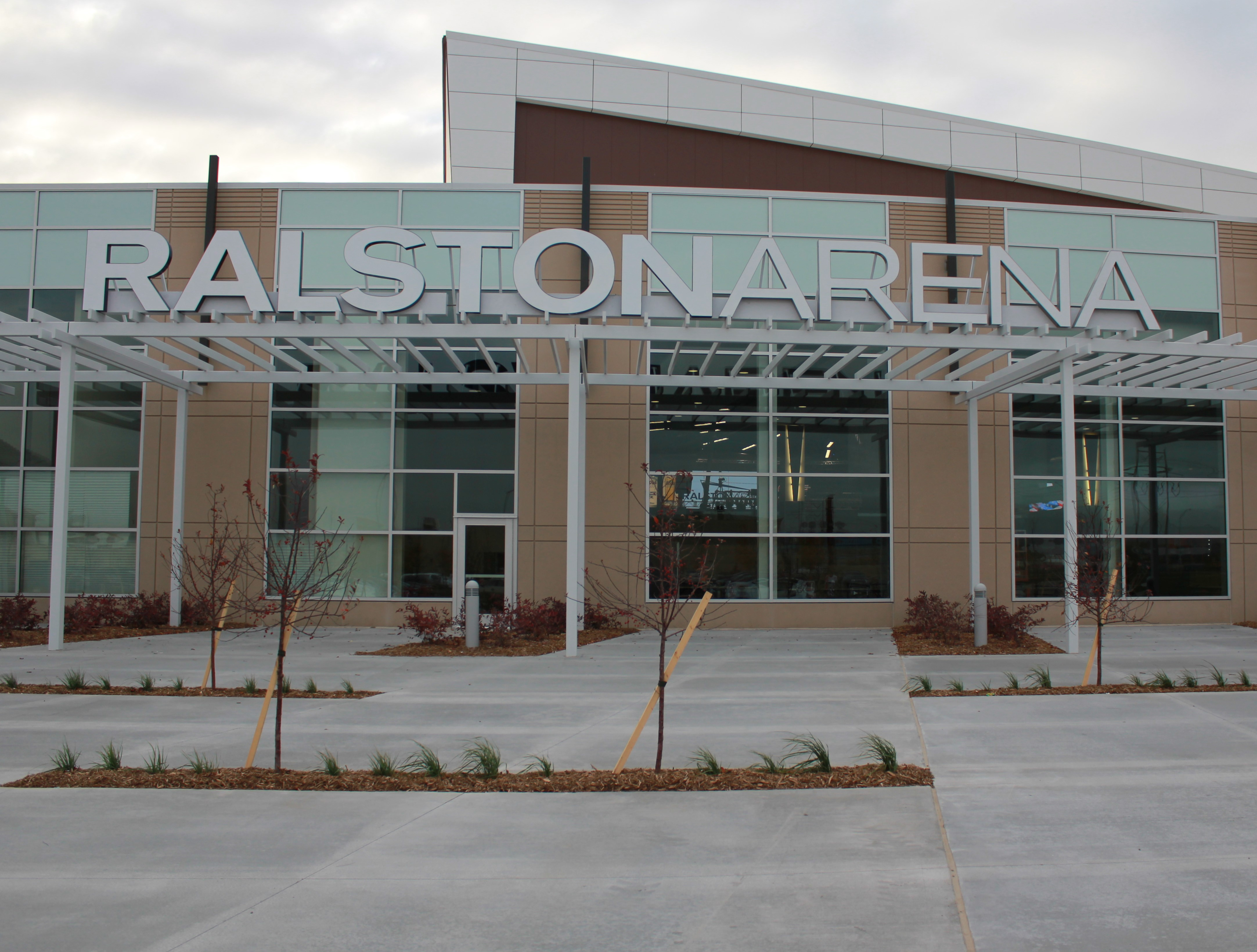
Liberty First Credit Union Arena

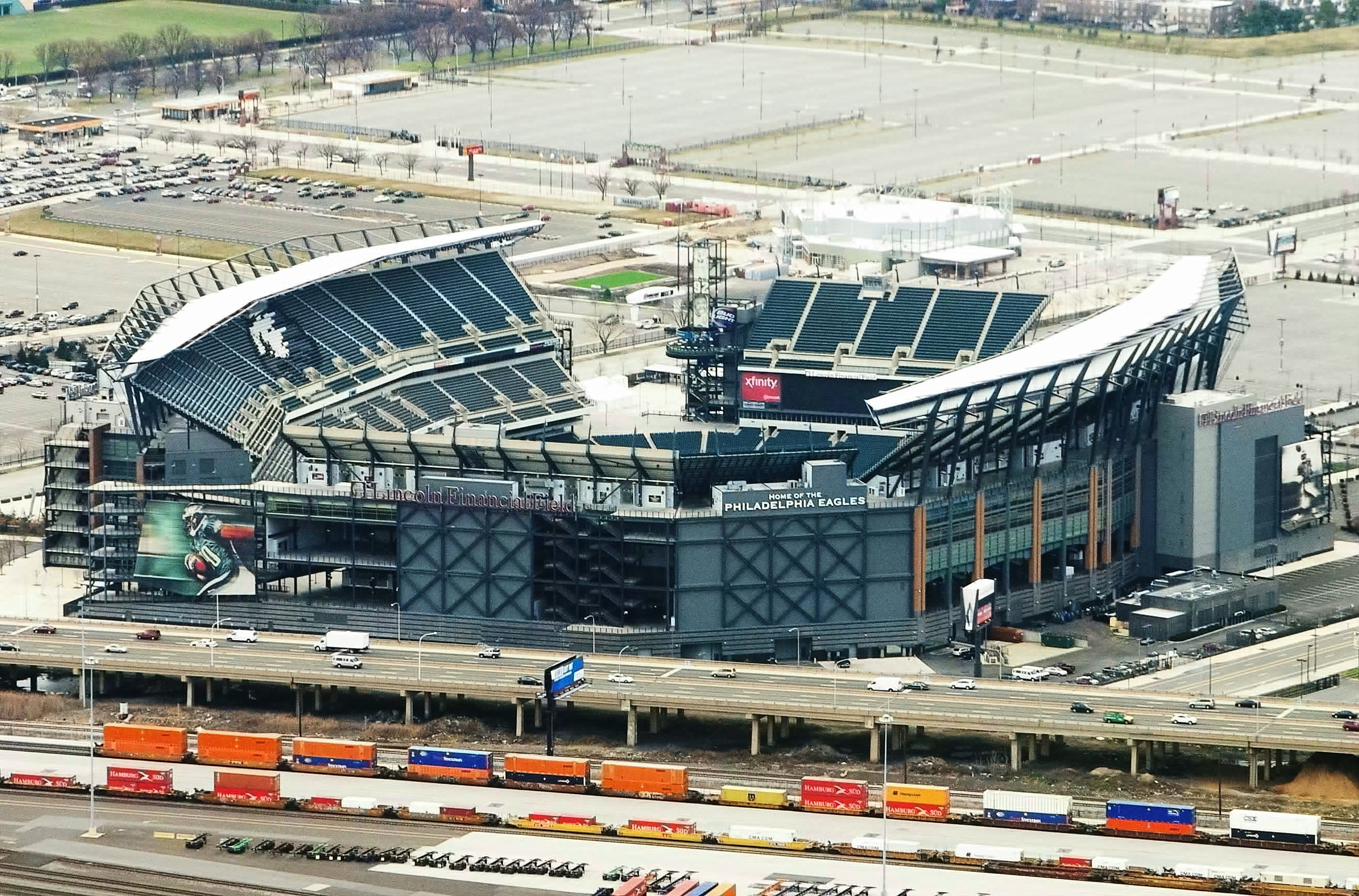
Lincoln Financial Field

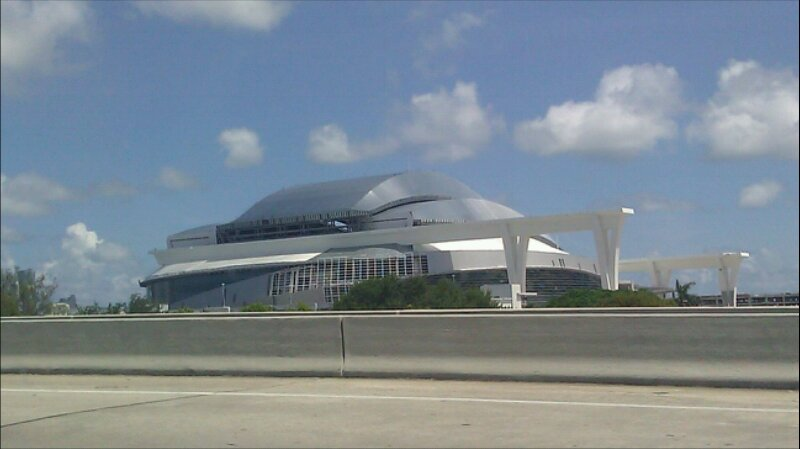
LoanDepot Park

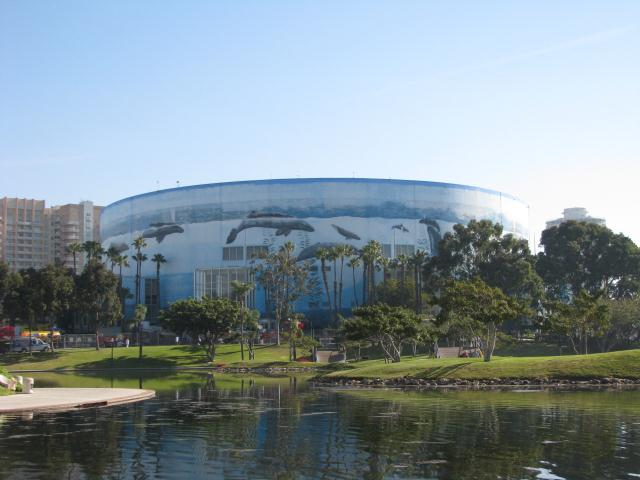
Long Beach Arena

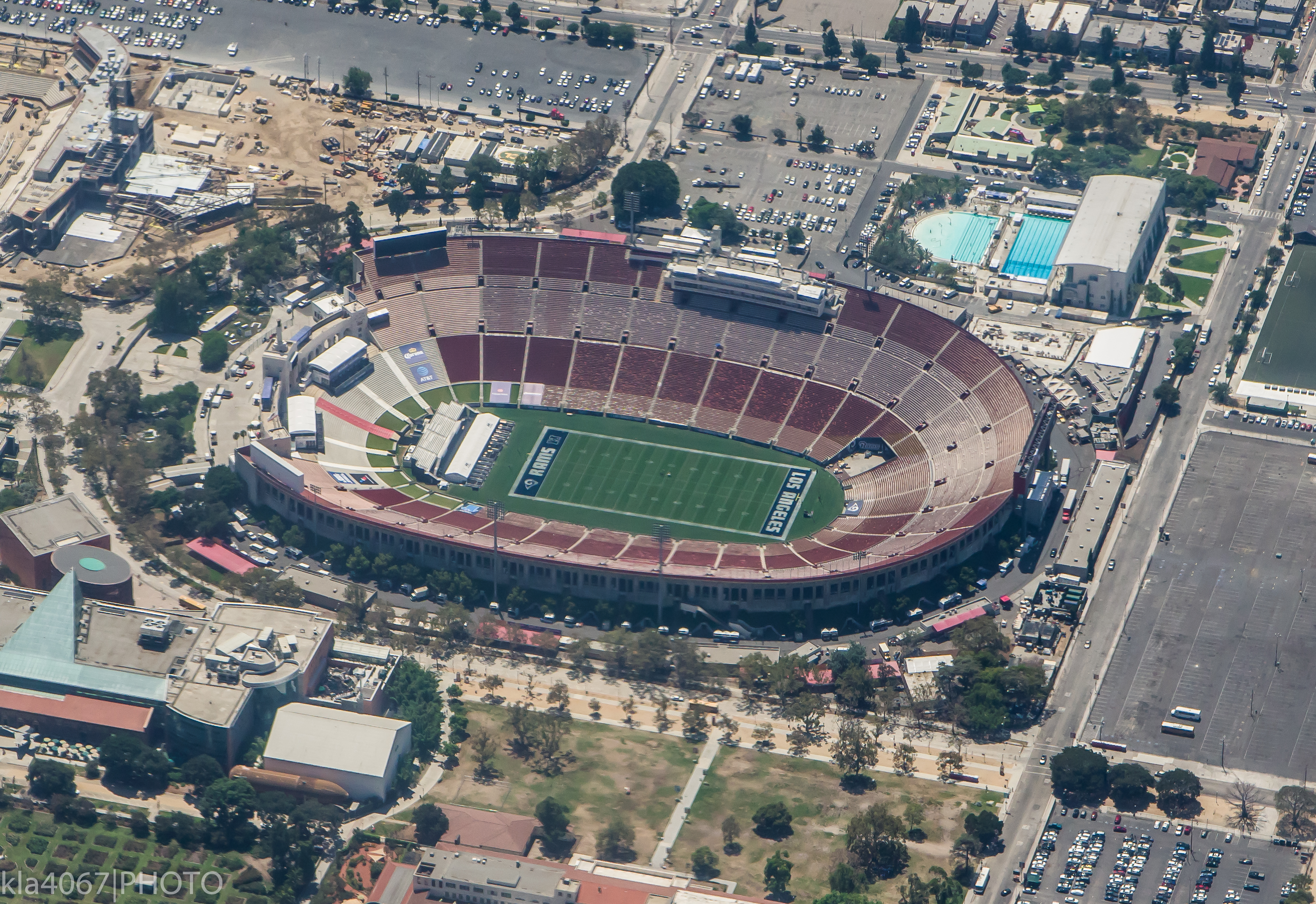
Los Angeles Memorial Coliseum

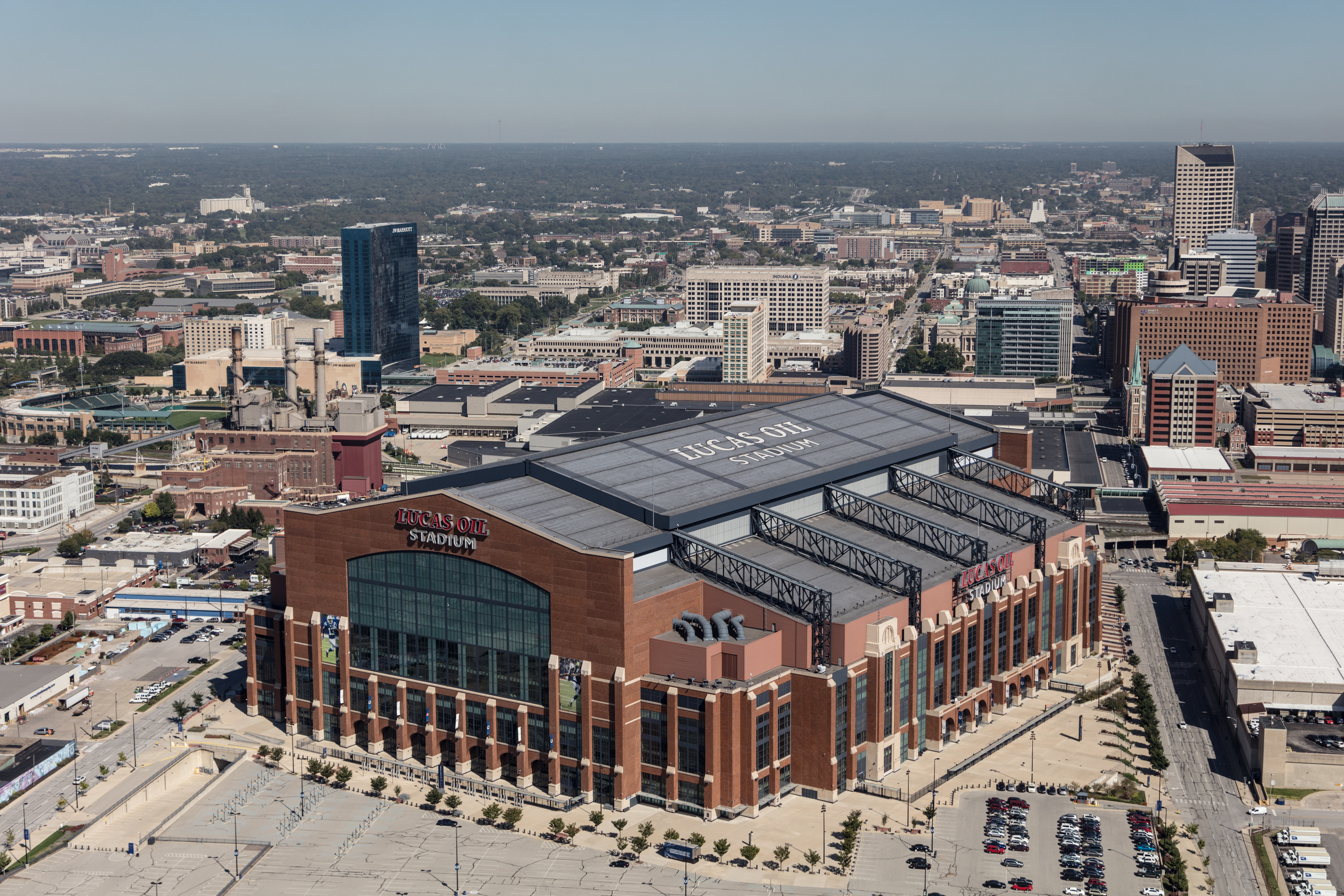
Lucas Oil Stadium

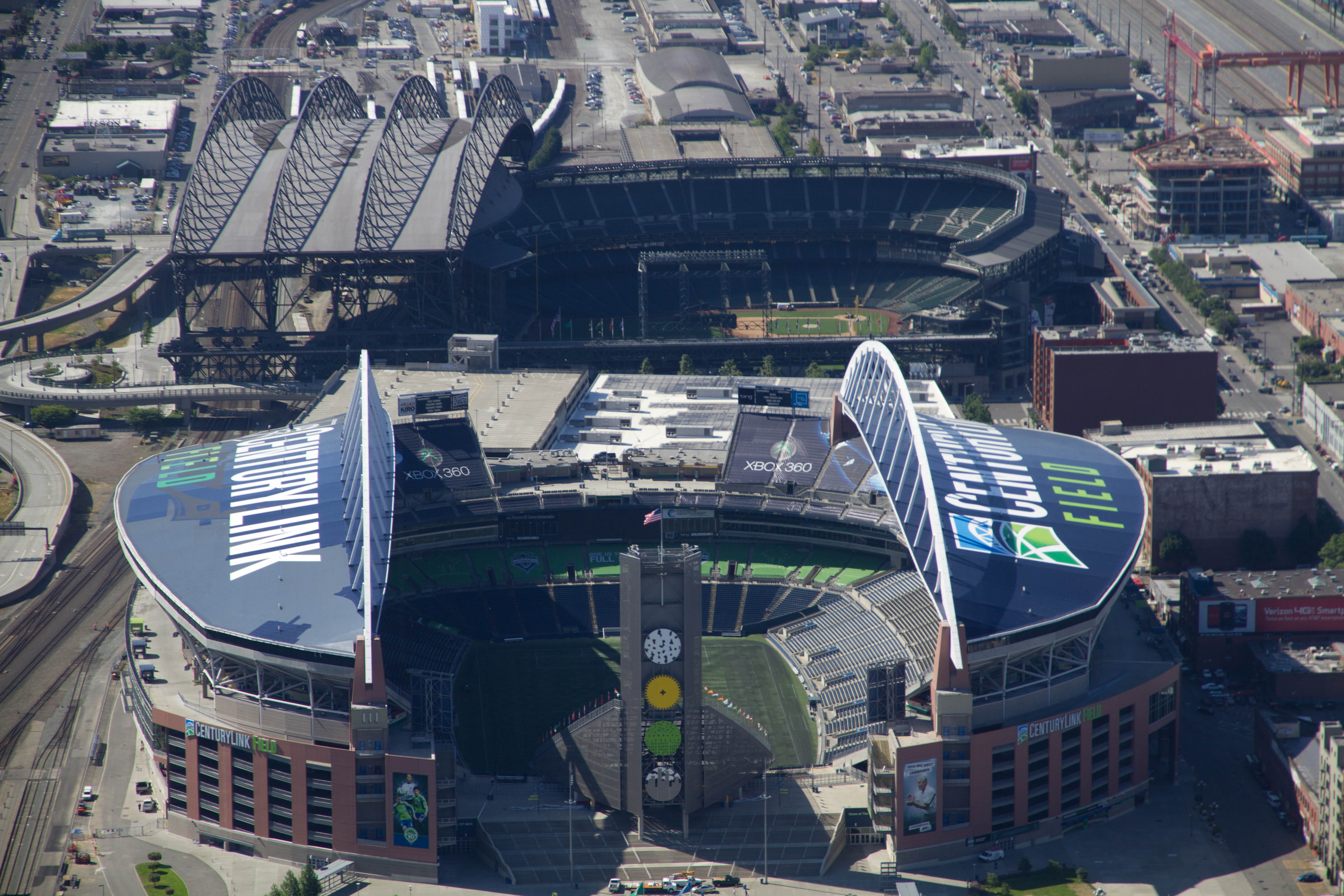
Lumen Field

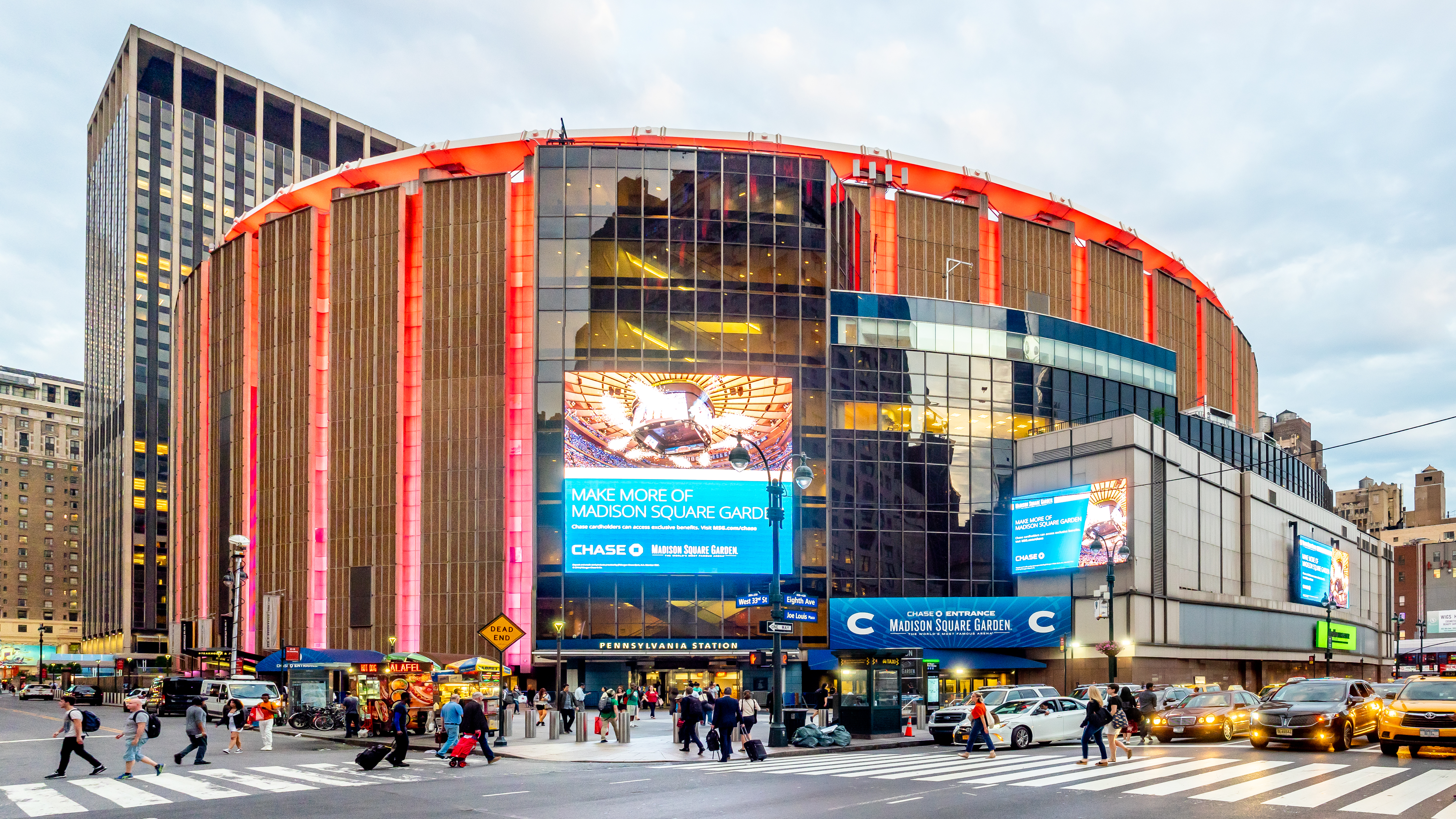
Madison Square Garden

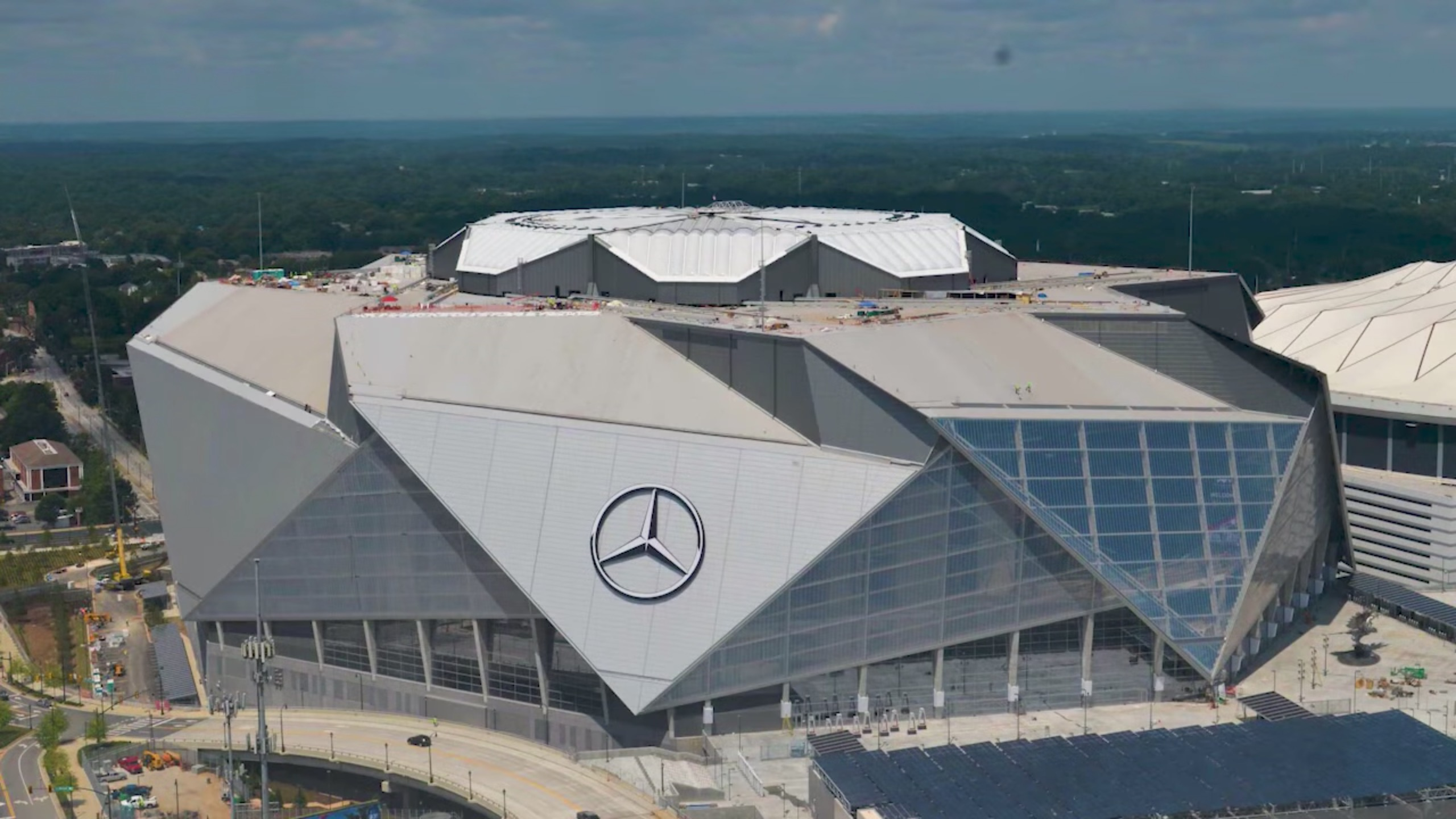
Mercedes-Benz Stadium

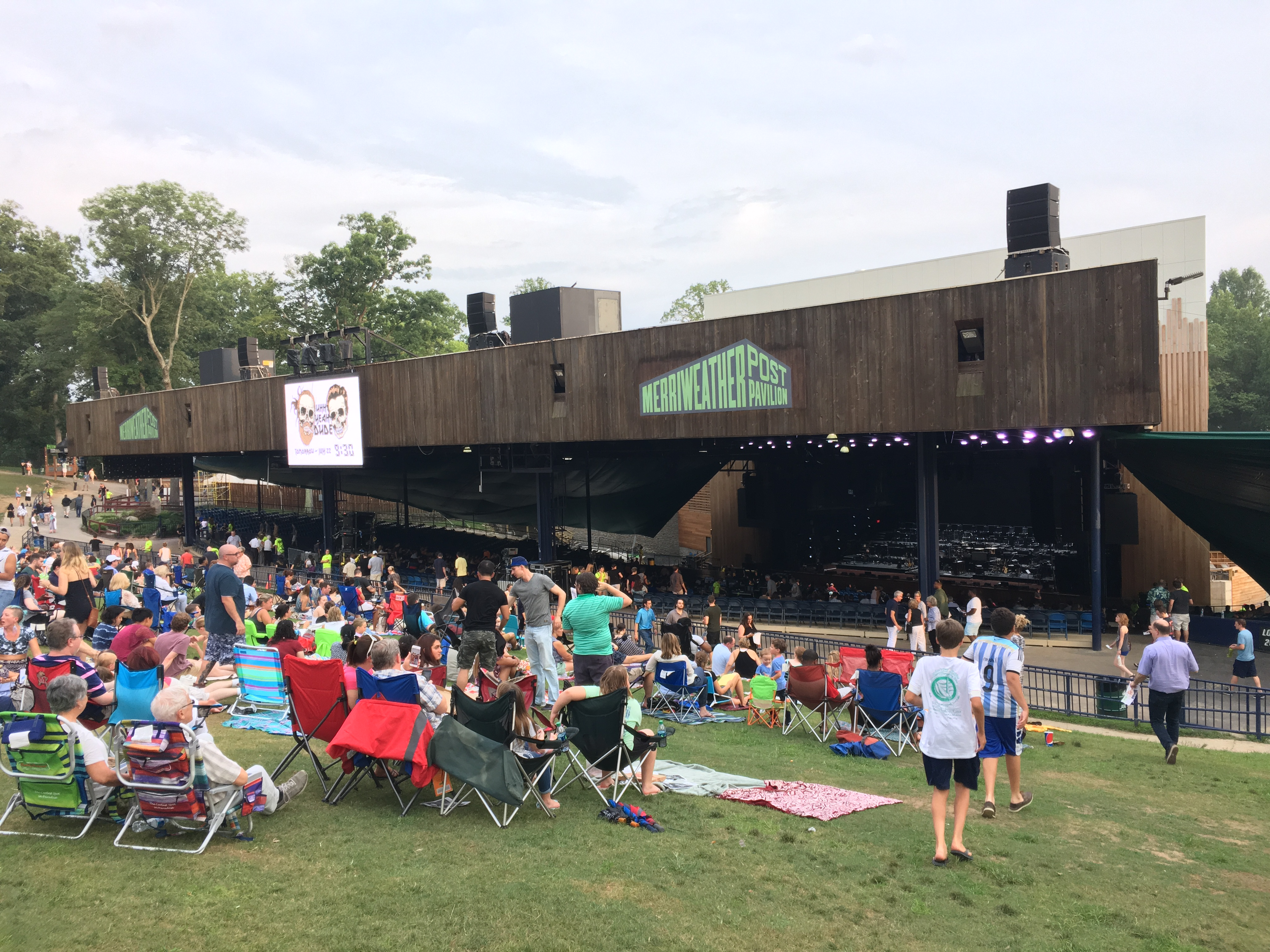
Merriweather Post Pavilion

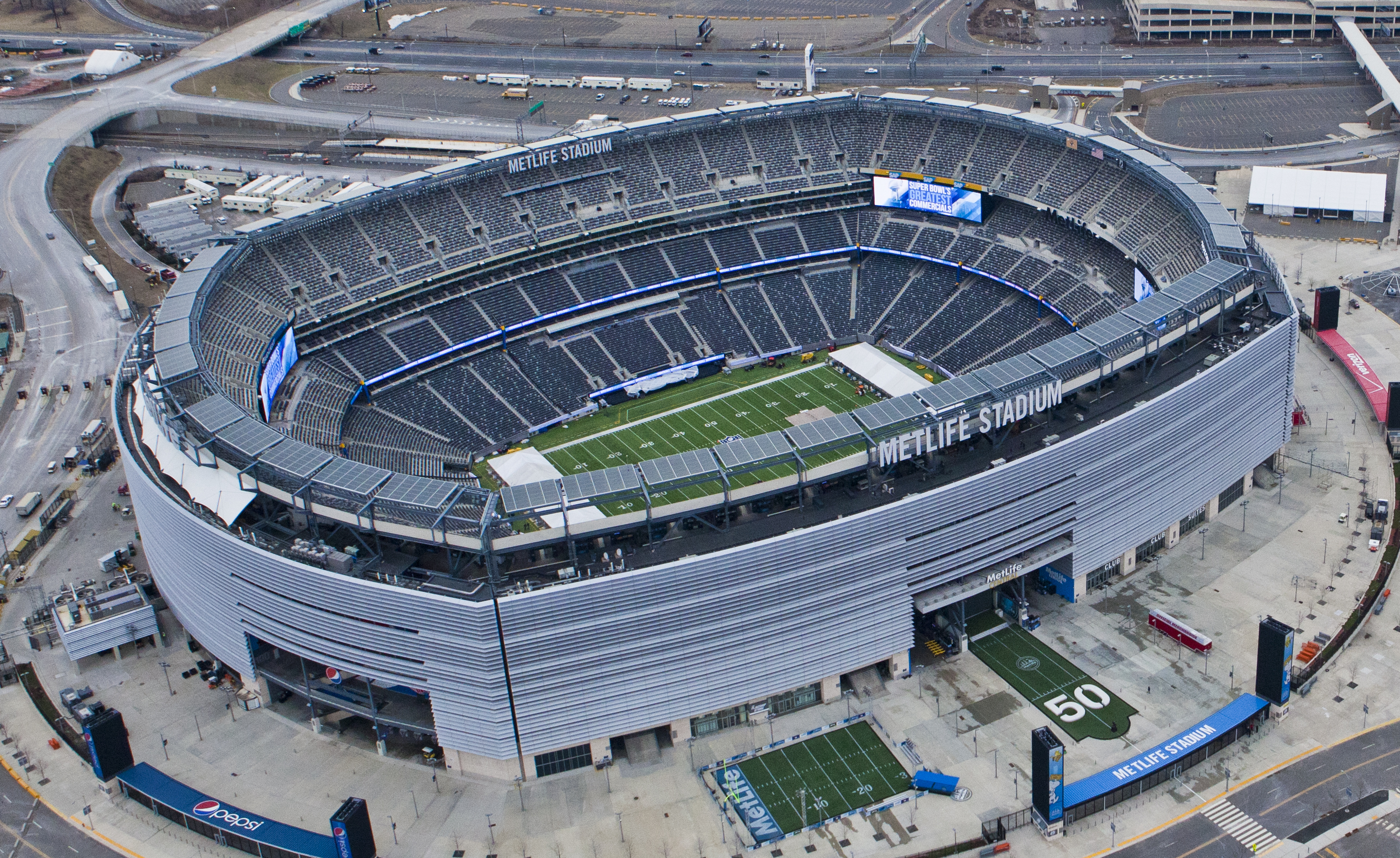
MetLife Stadium

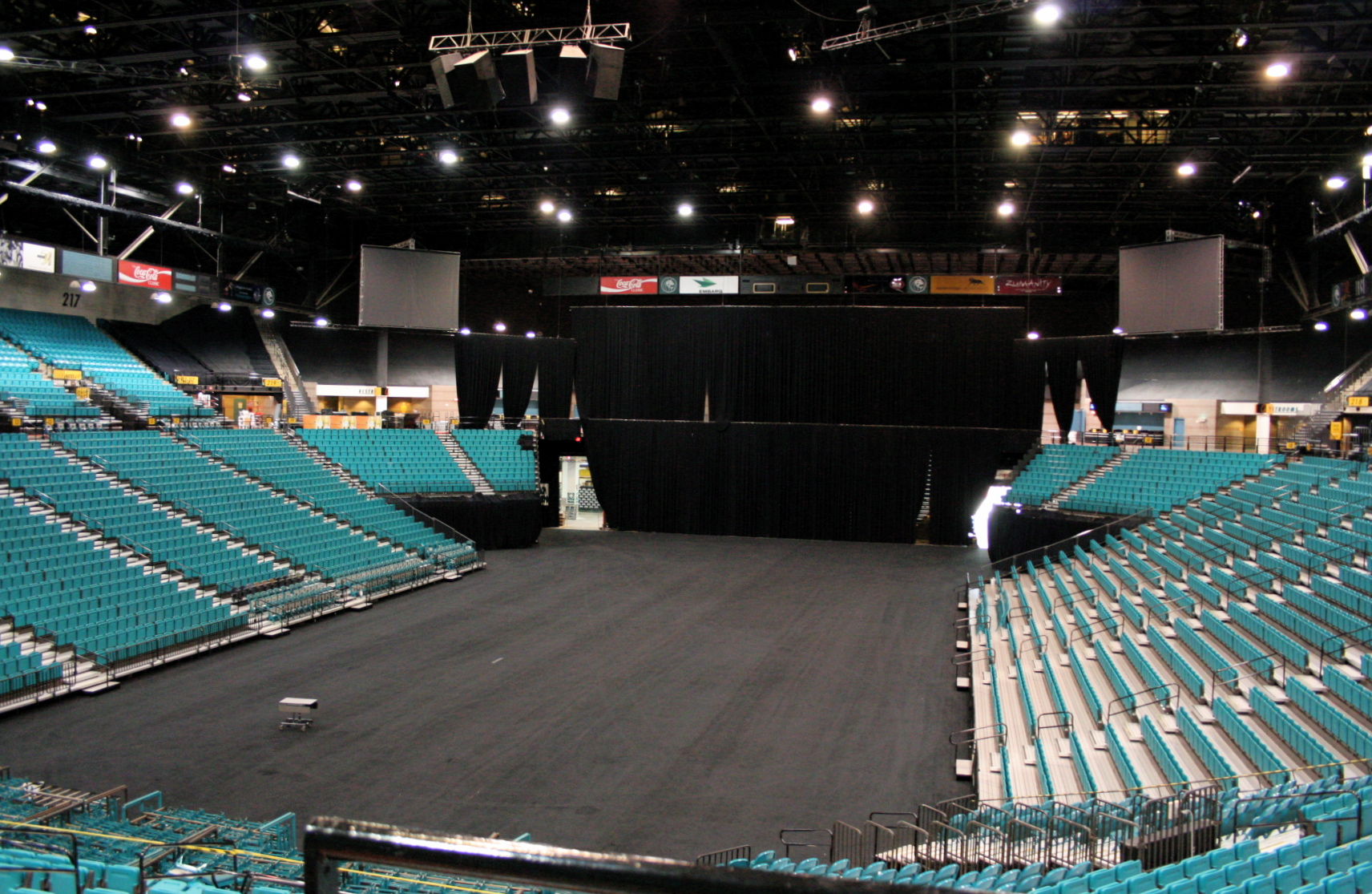
MGM Grand Garden Arena

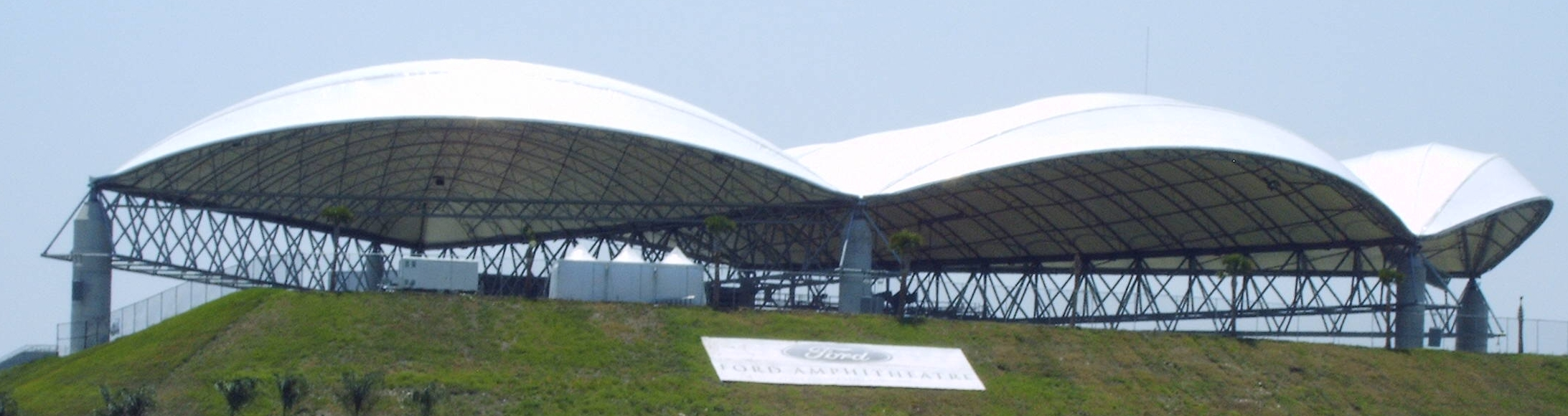
MidFlorida Credit Union Amphitheatre

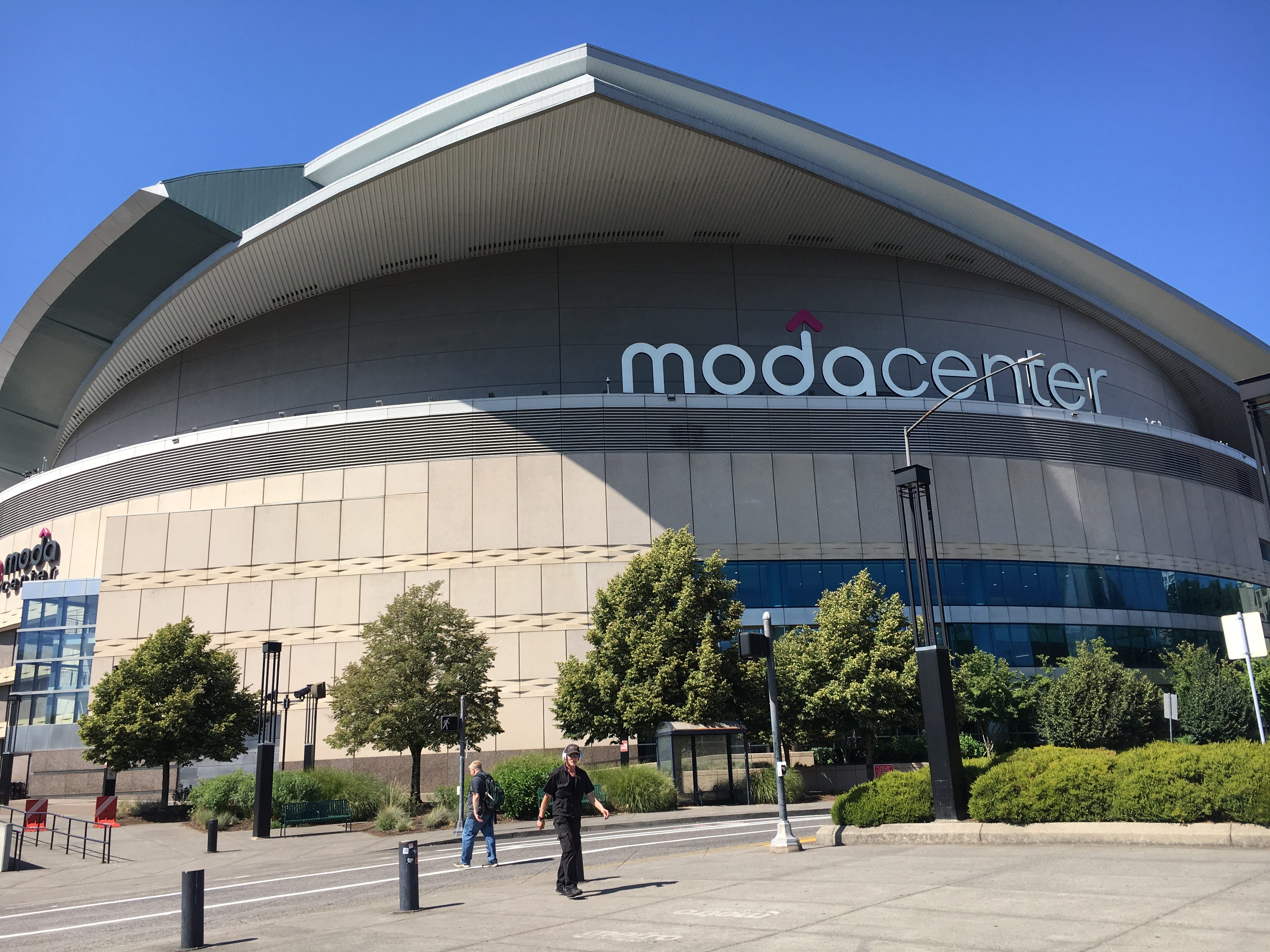
Moda Center

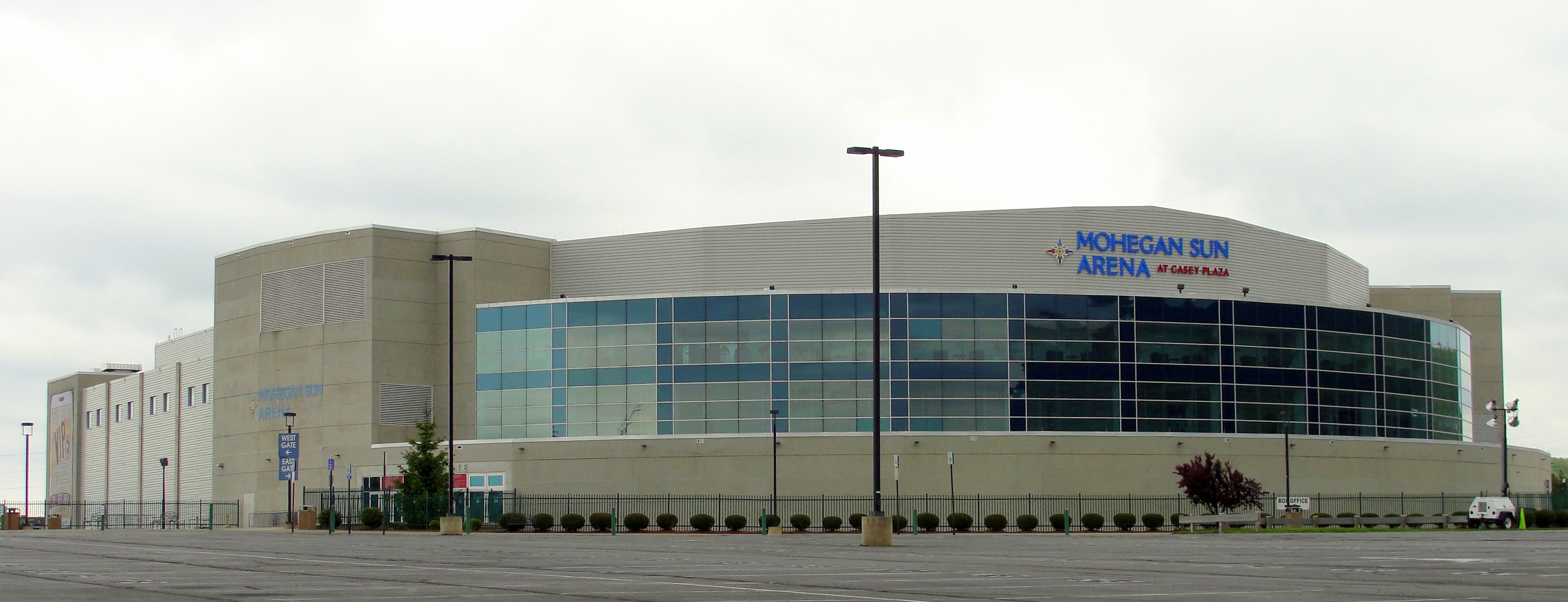
Mohegan Sun Arena

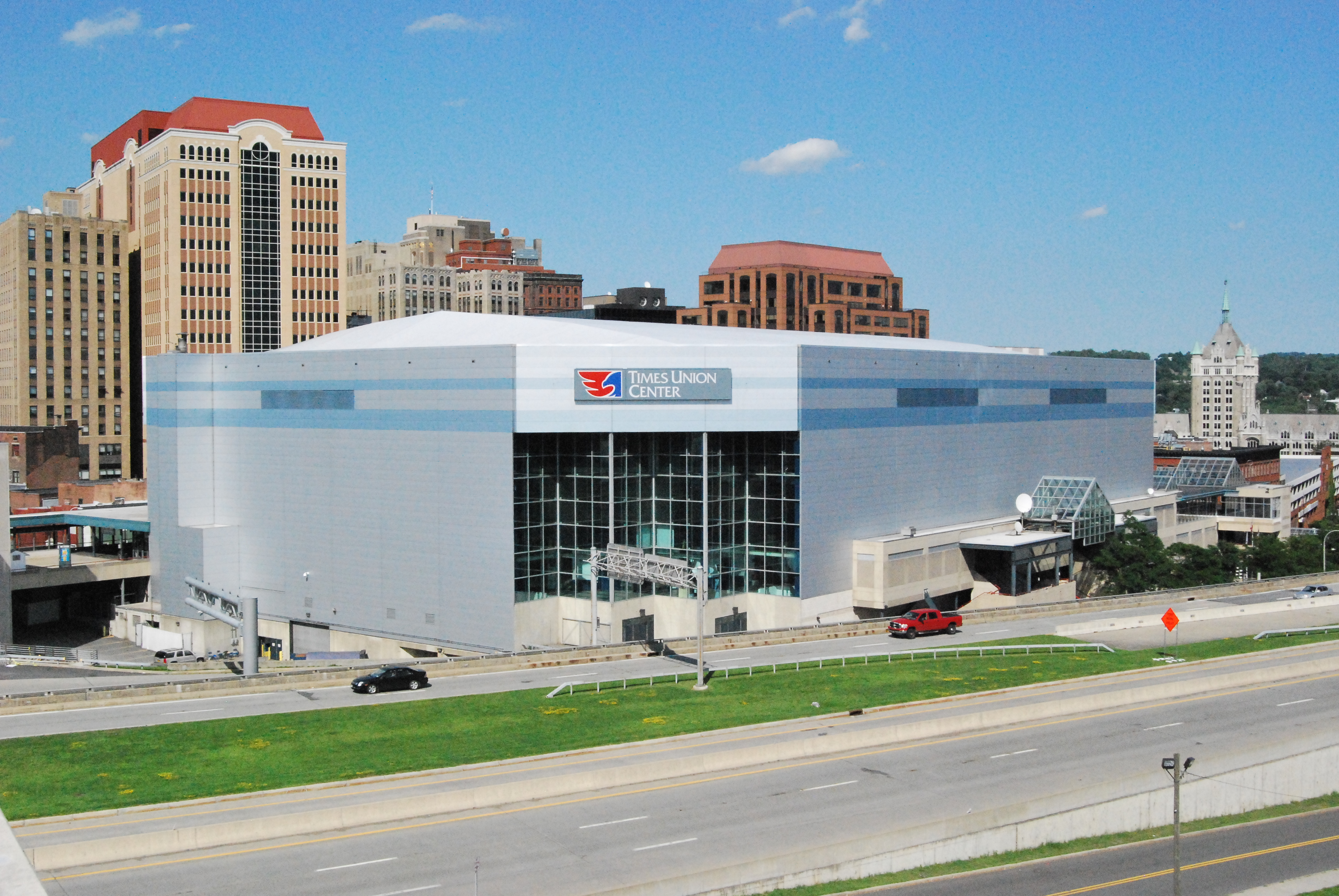
MVP Arena

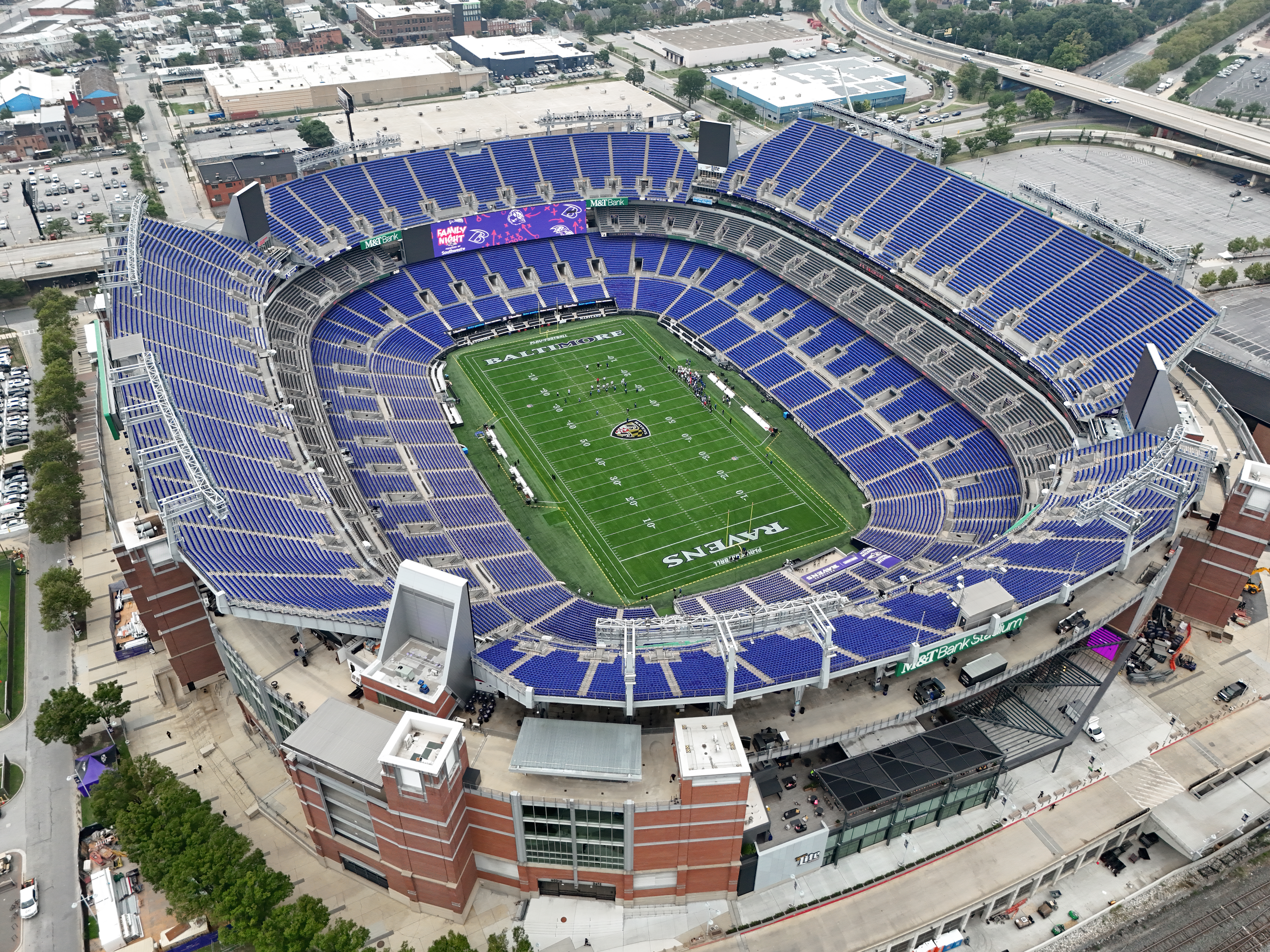
M&T Bank Stadium

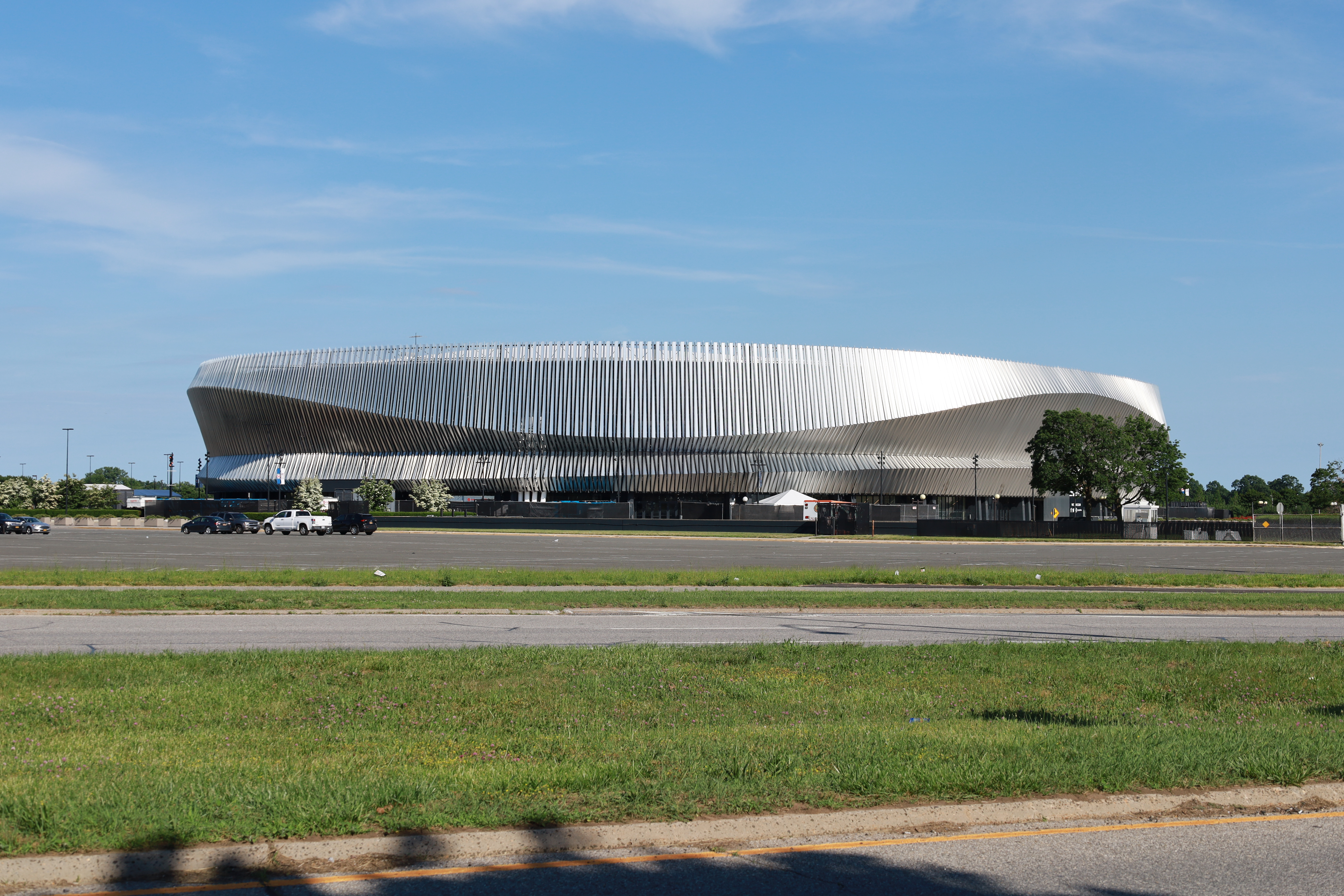
Nassau Coliseum

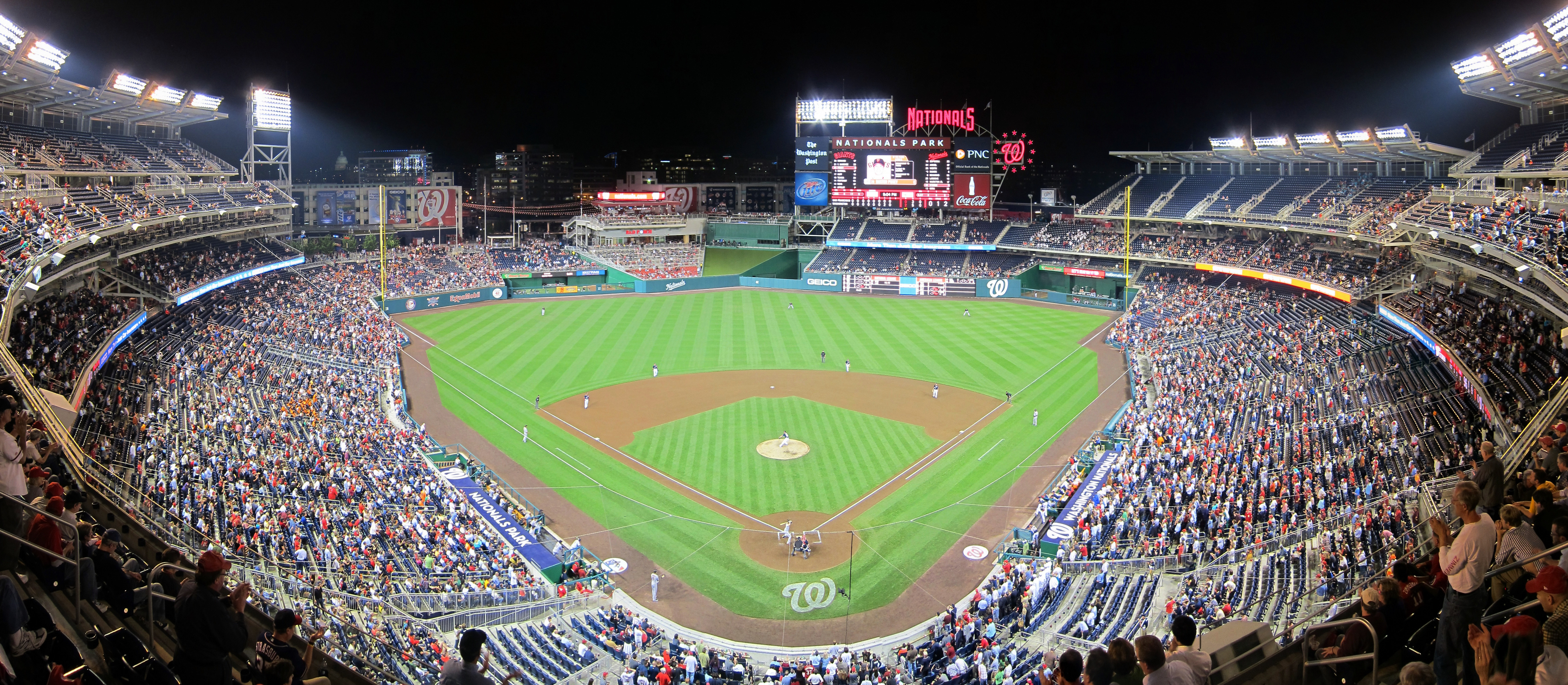
Nationals Park

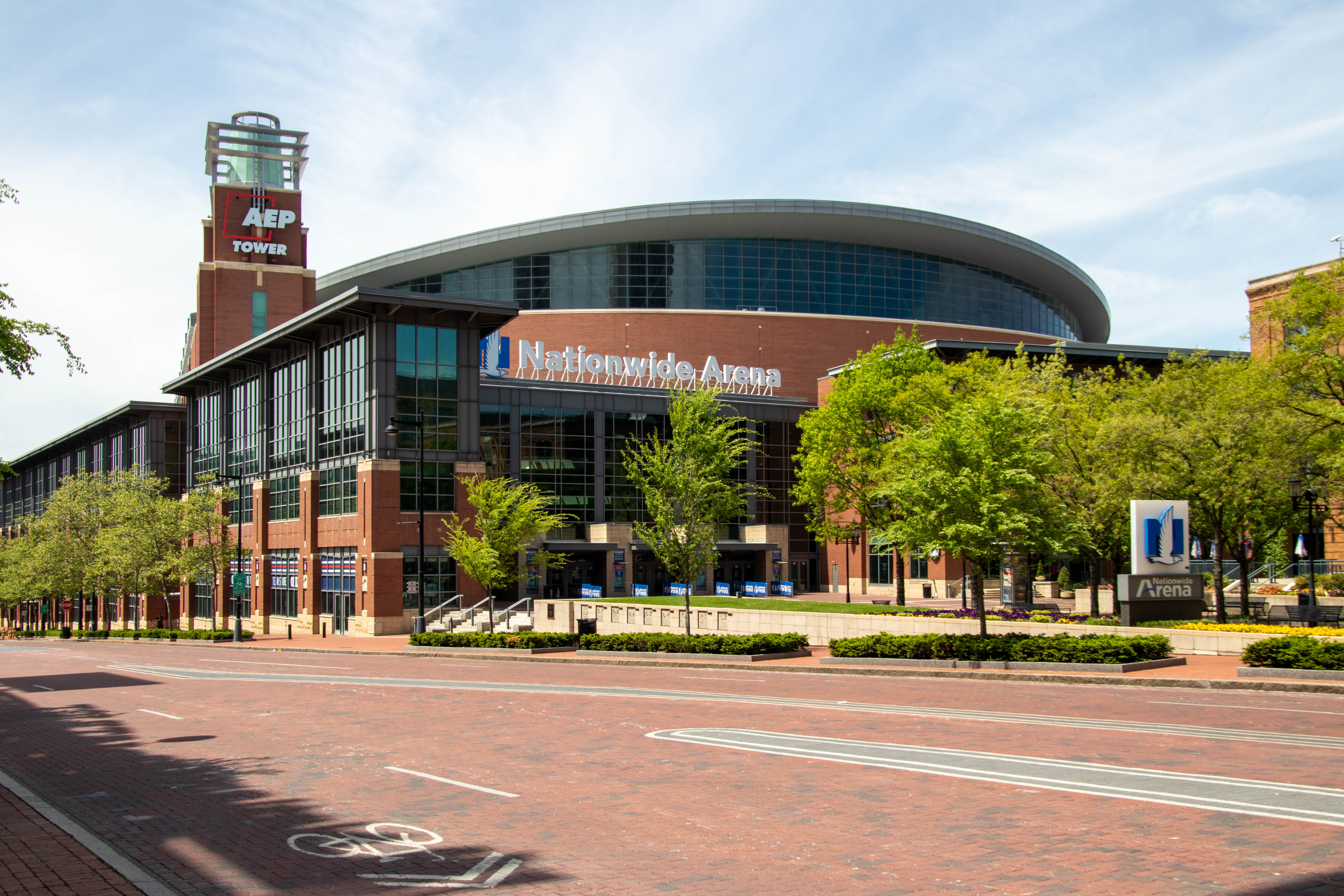
Nationwide Arena

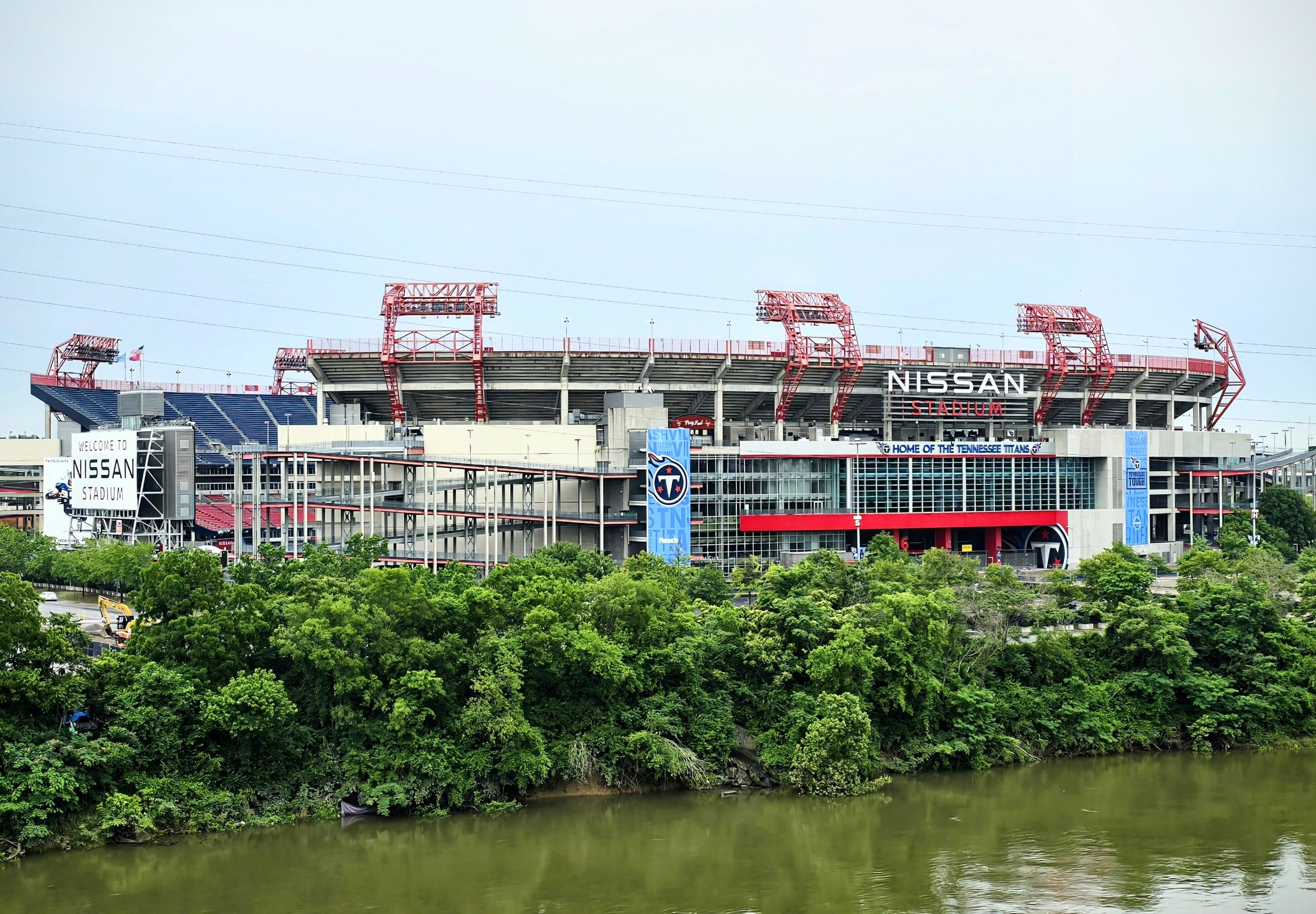
Nissan Stadium

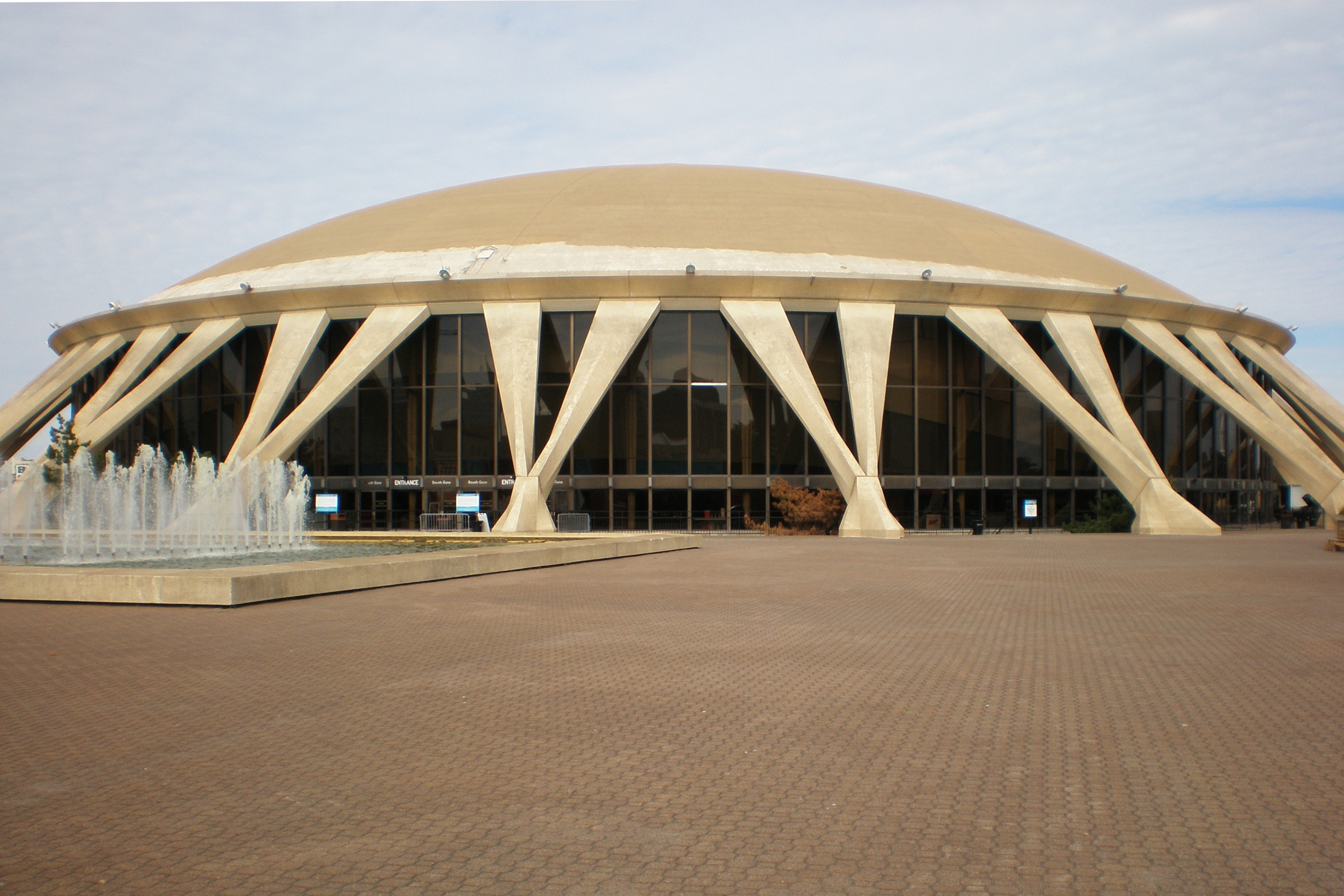
Norfolk Scope

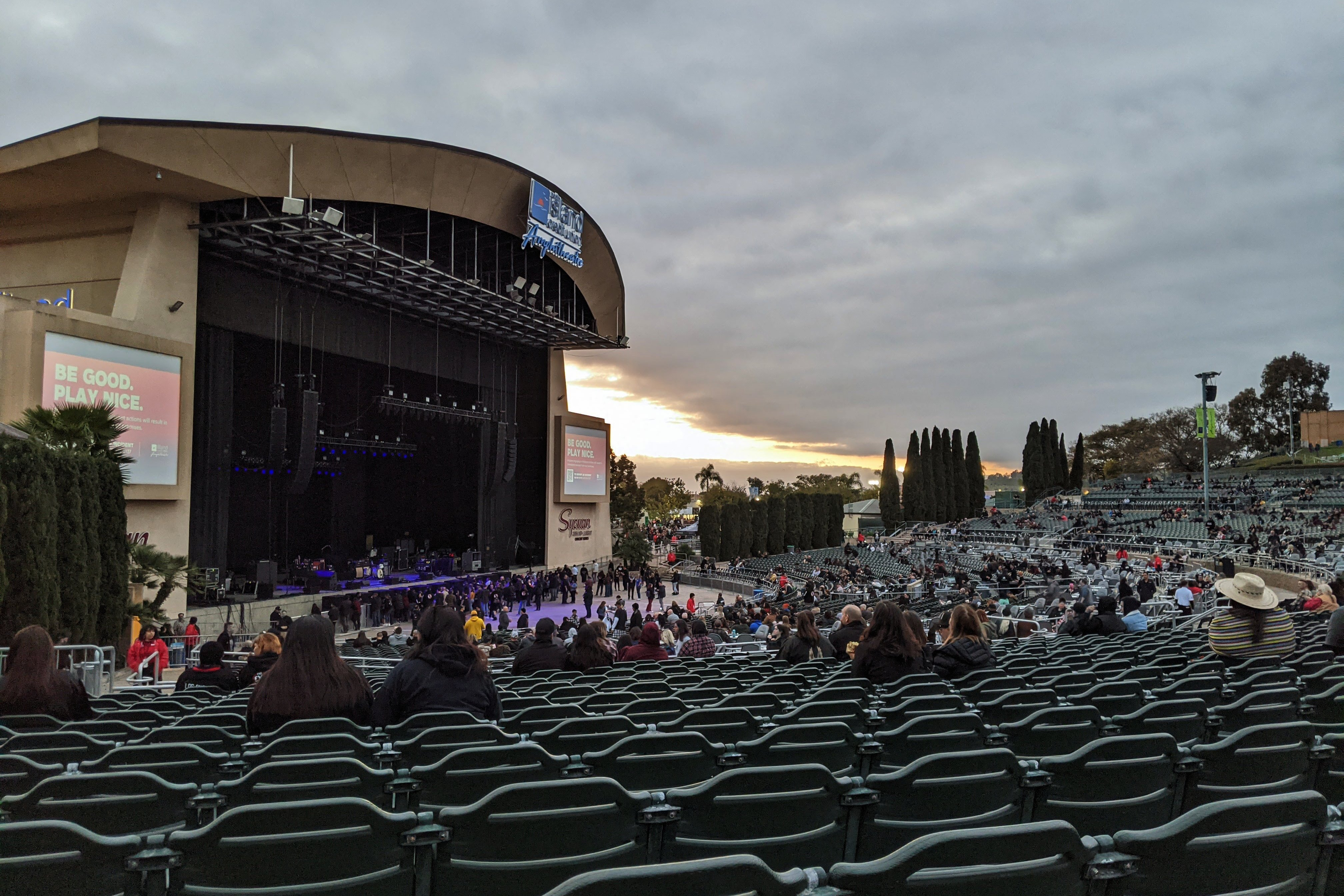
North Island Credit Union Amphitheatre

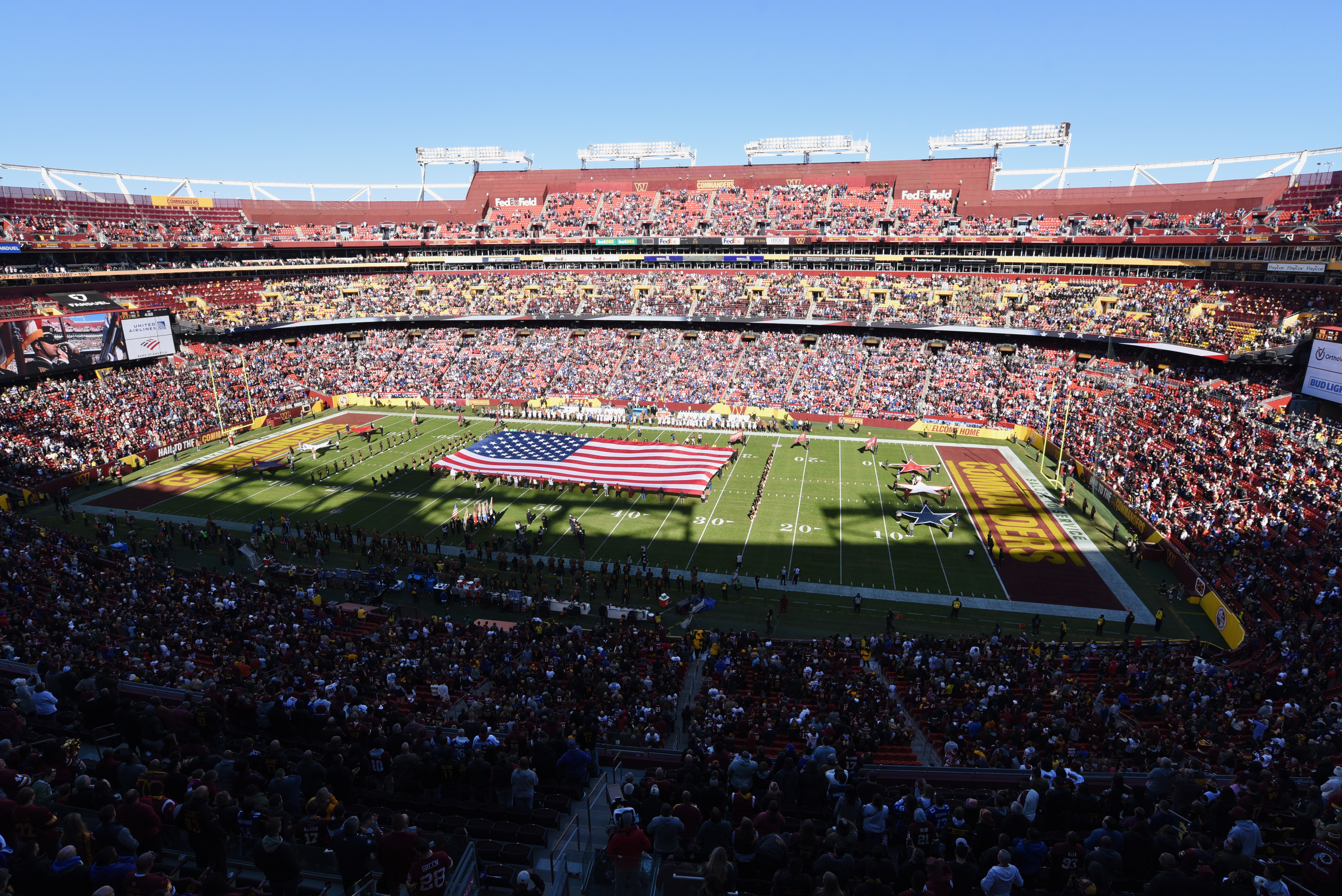
Northwest Stadium

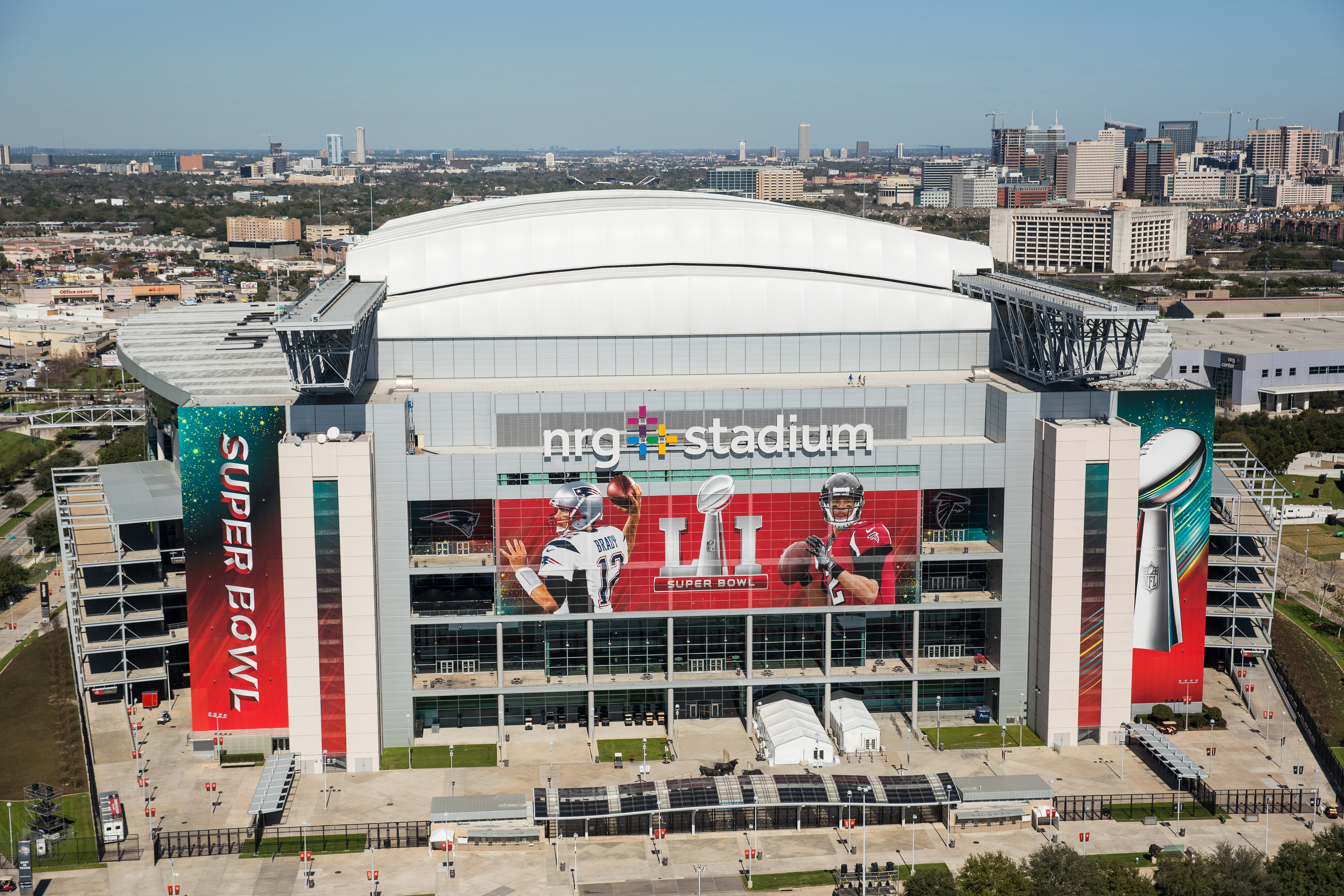
Reliant Stadium

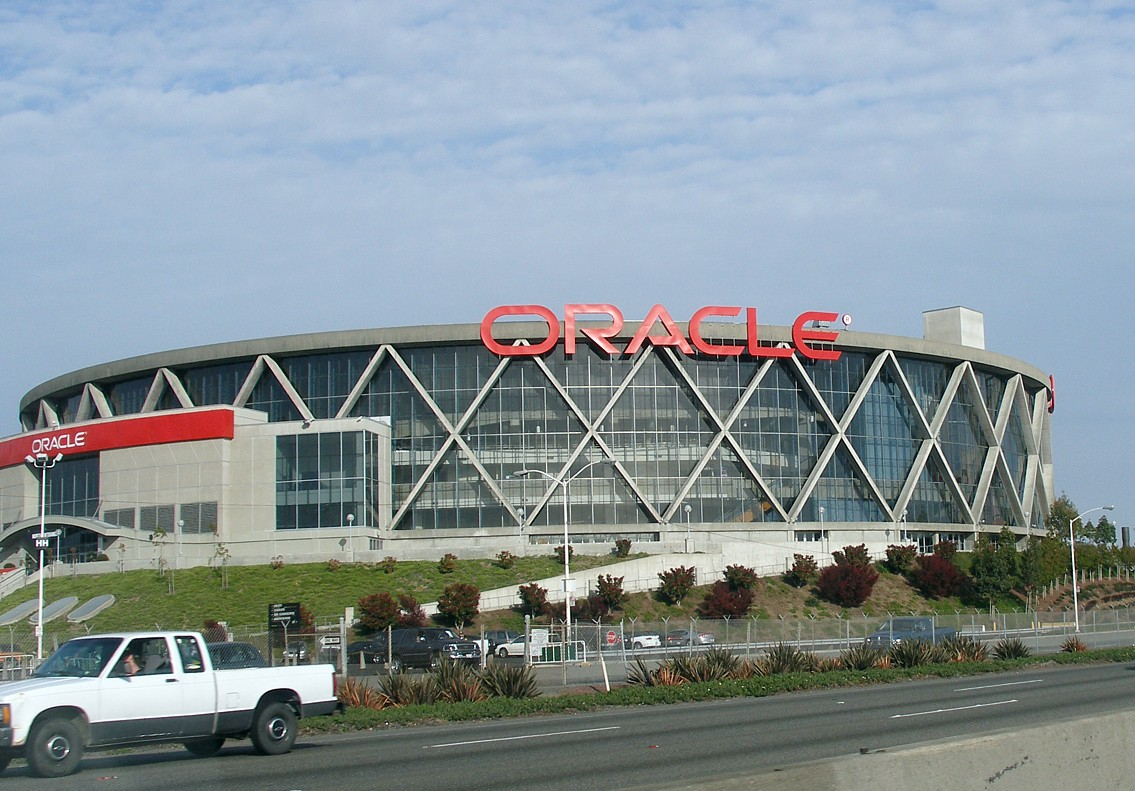
Oakland Arena

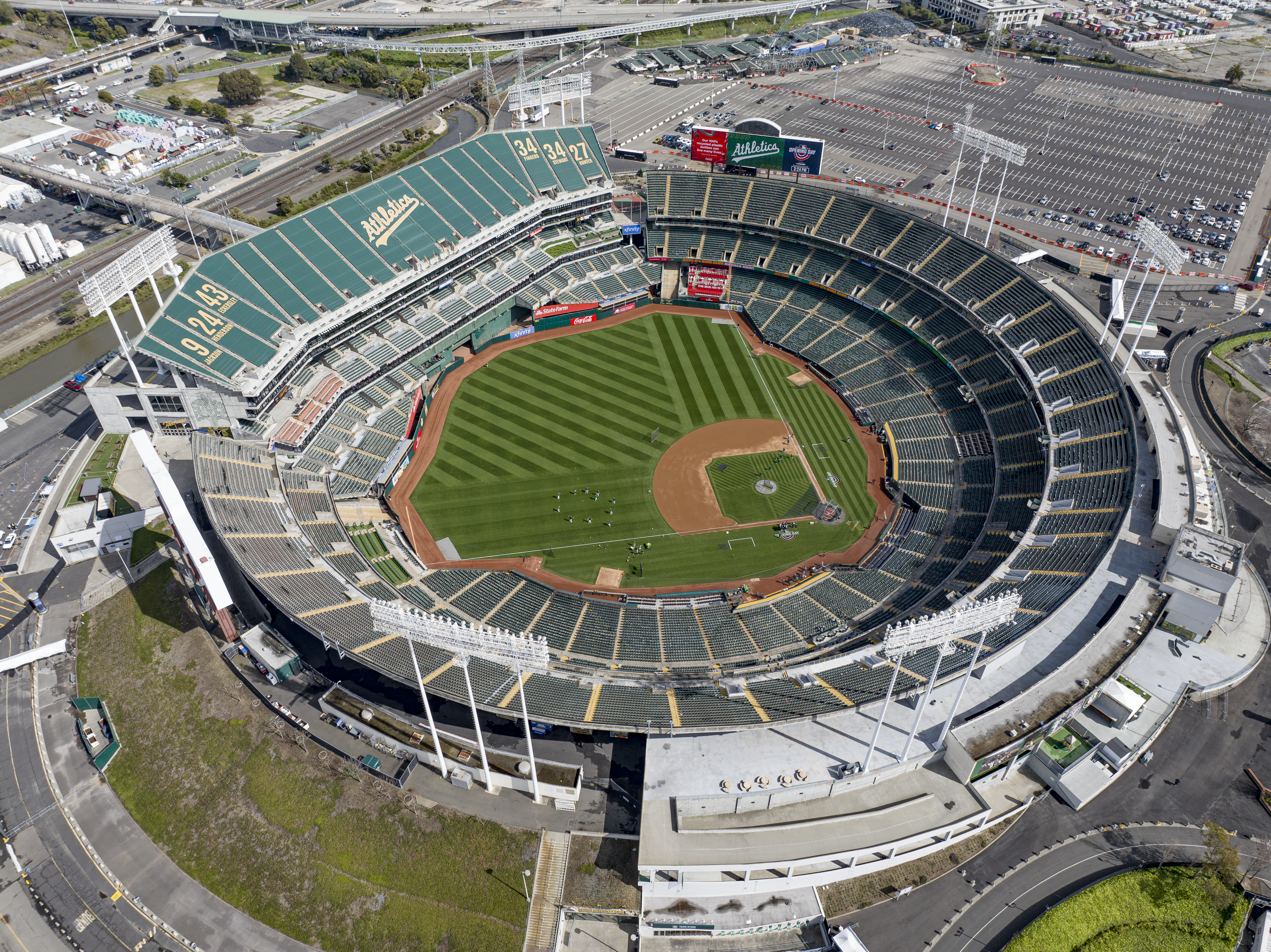
Oakland Coliseum

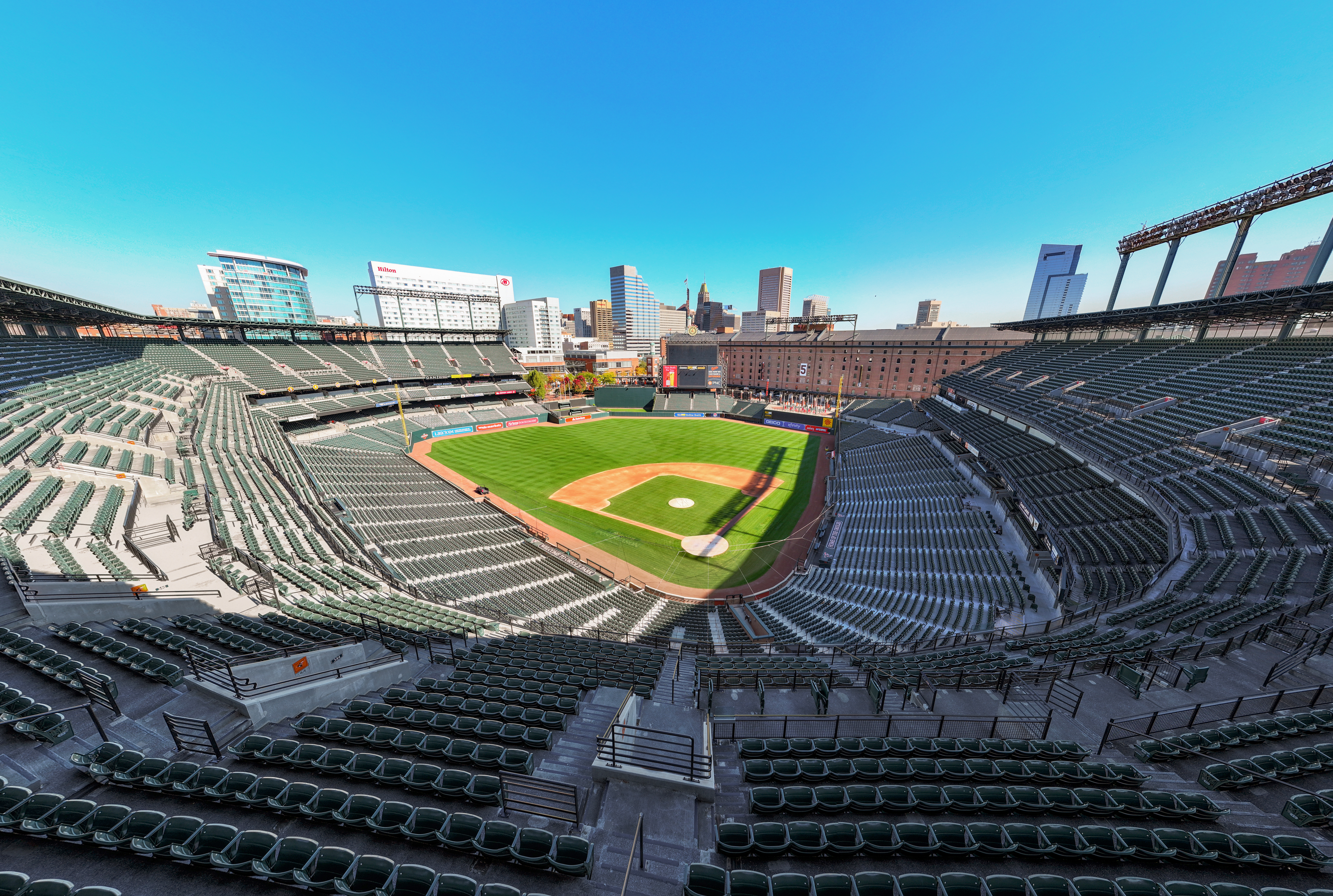
Oriole Park at Camden Yards

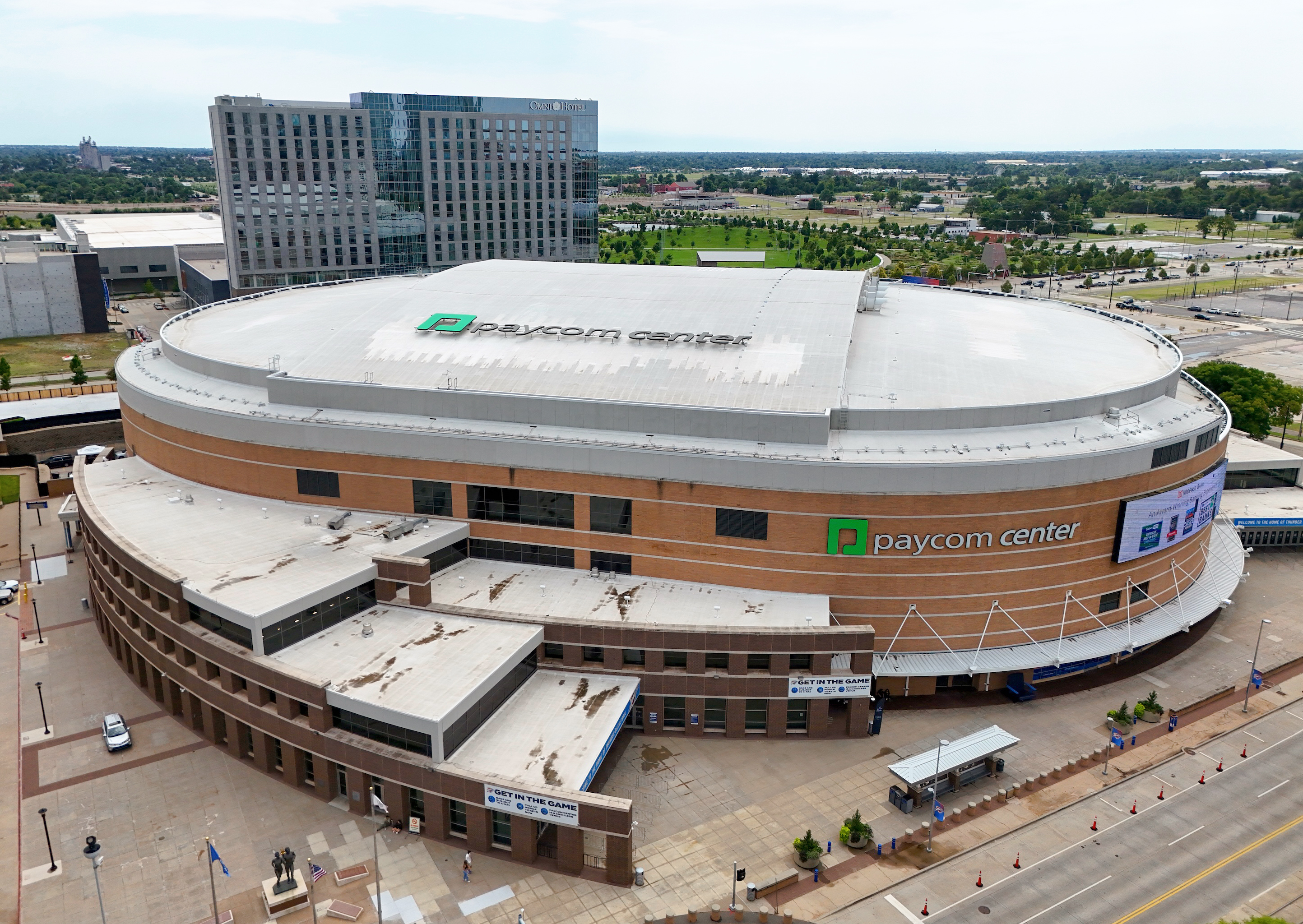
Paycom Center

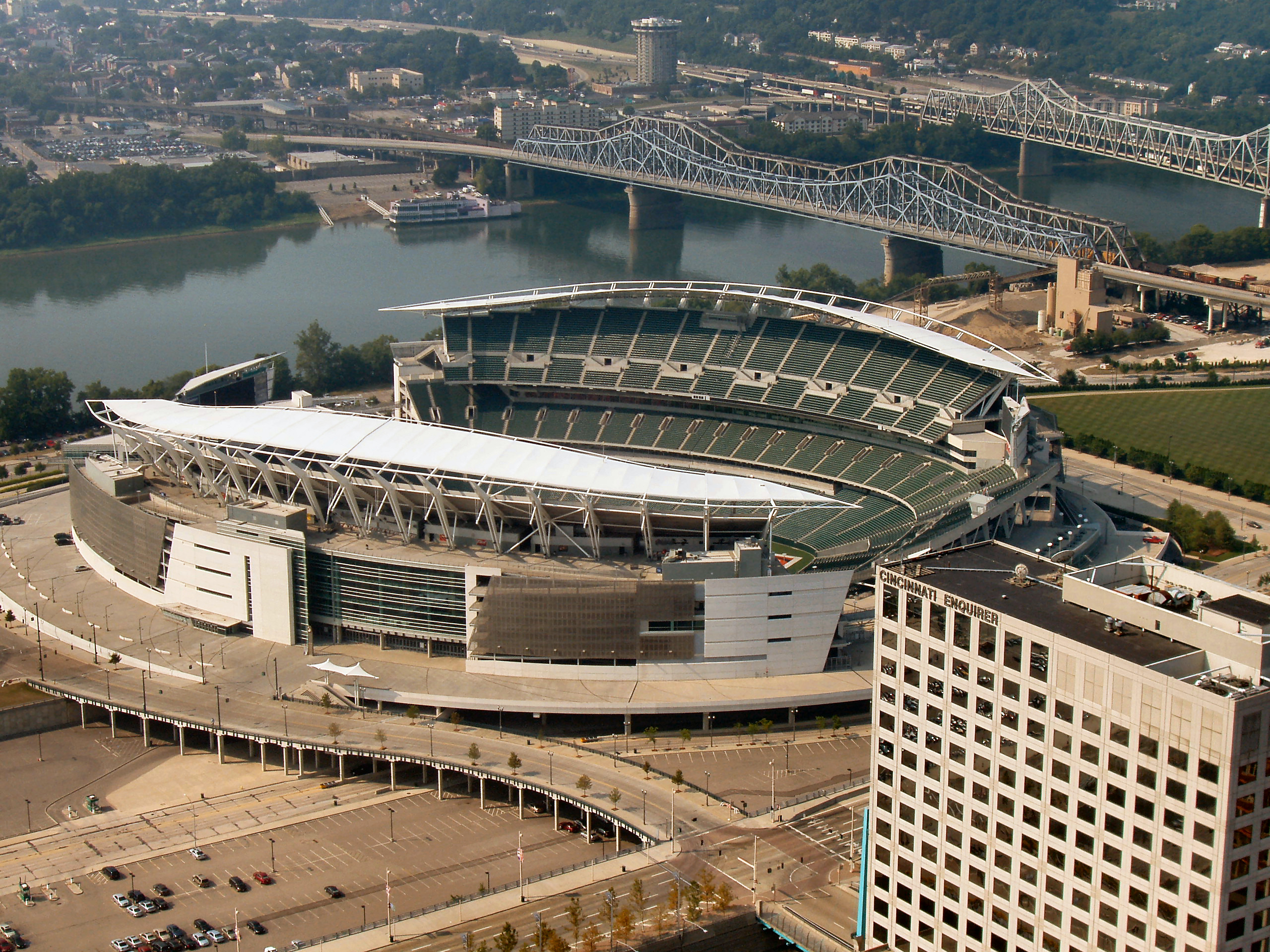
Paycor Stadium

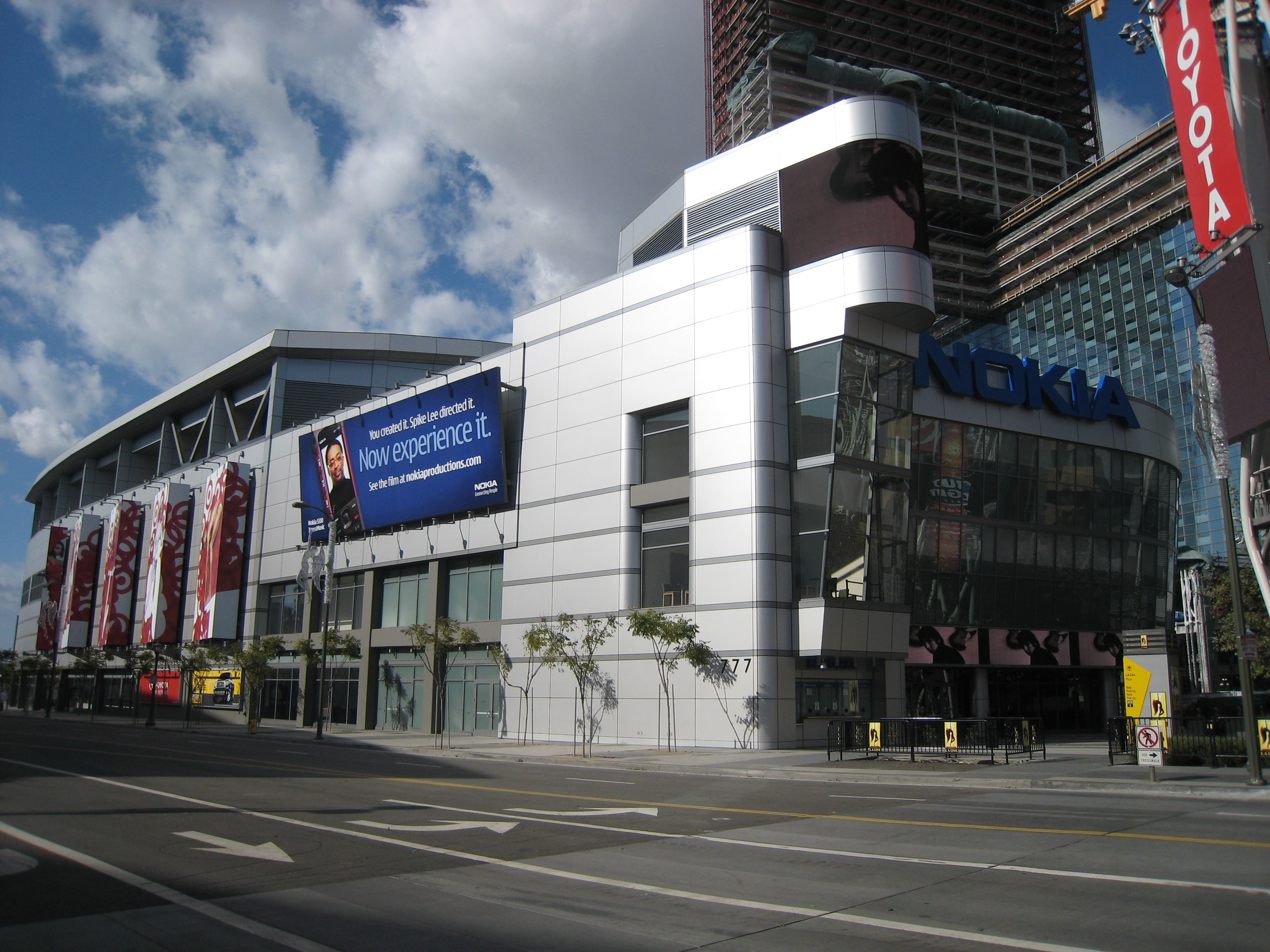
Peacock Theater

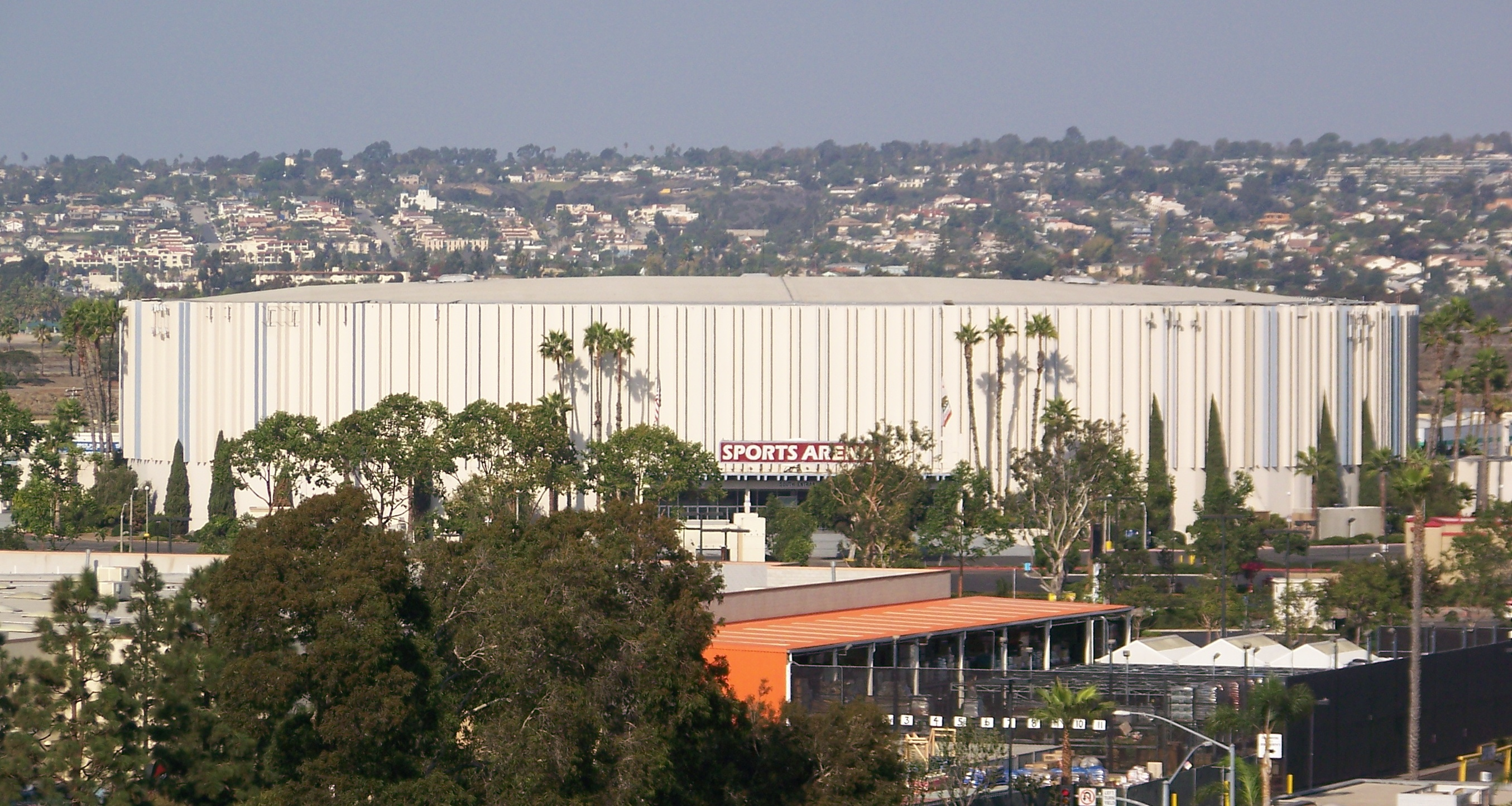
Pechanga Arena

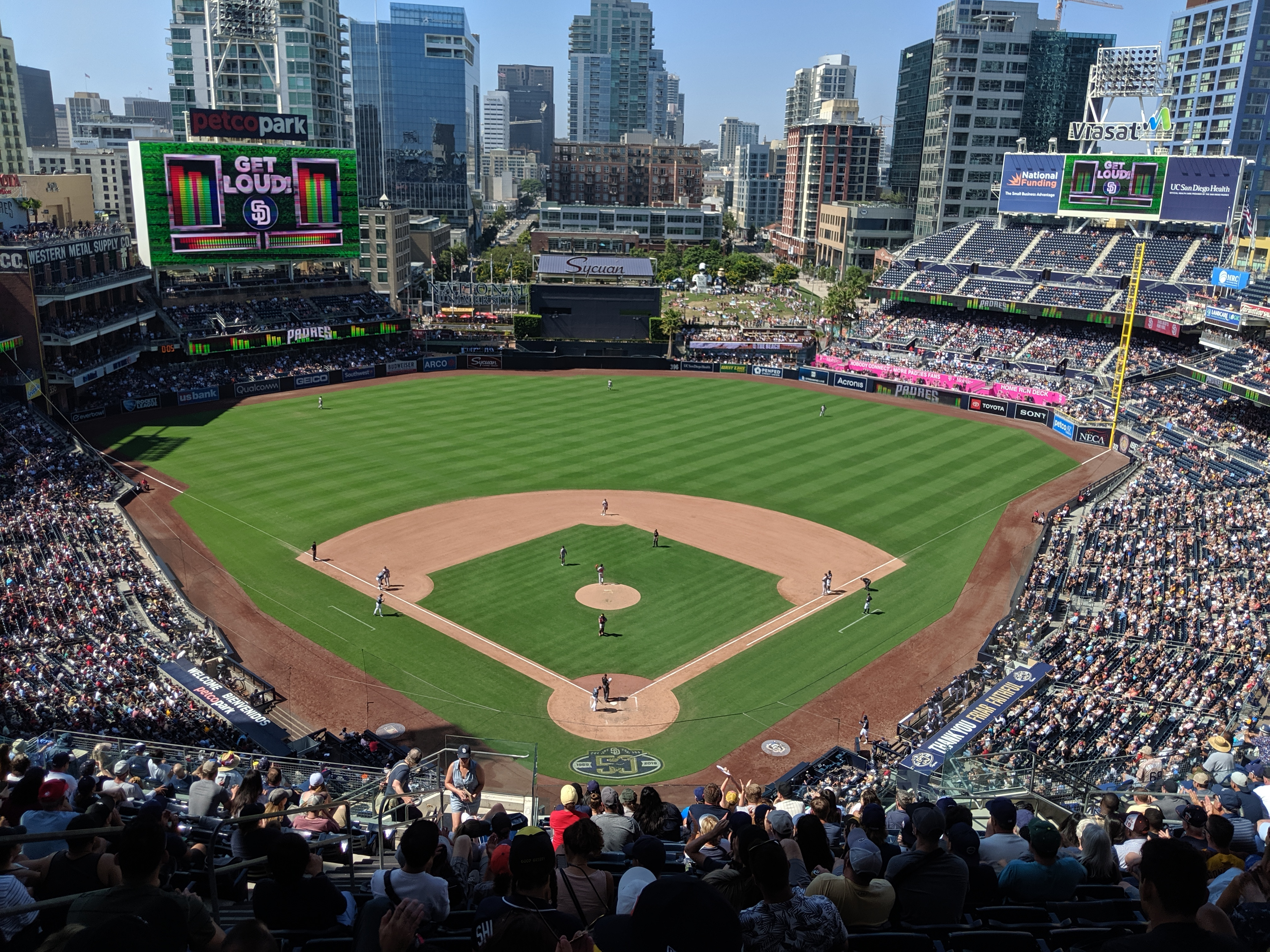
Petco Park

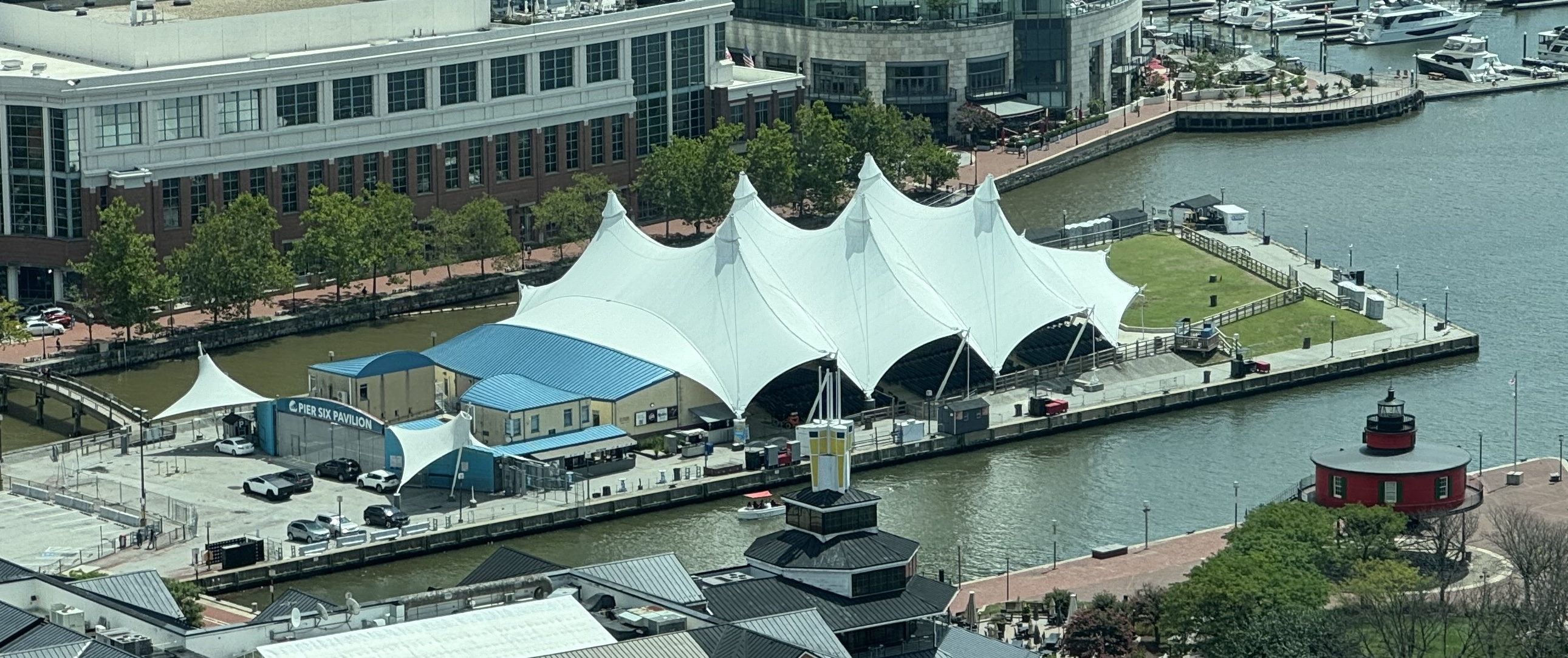
Pier Six Pavilion

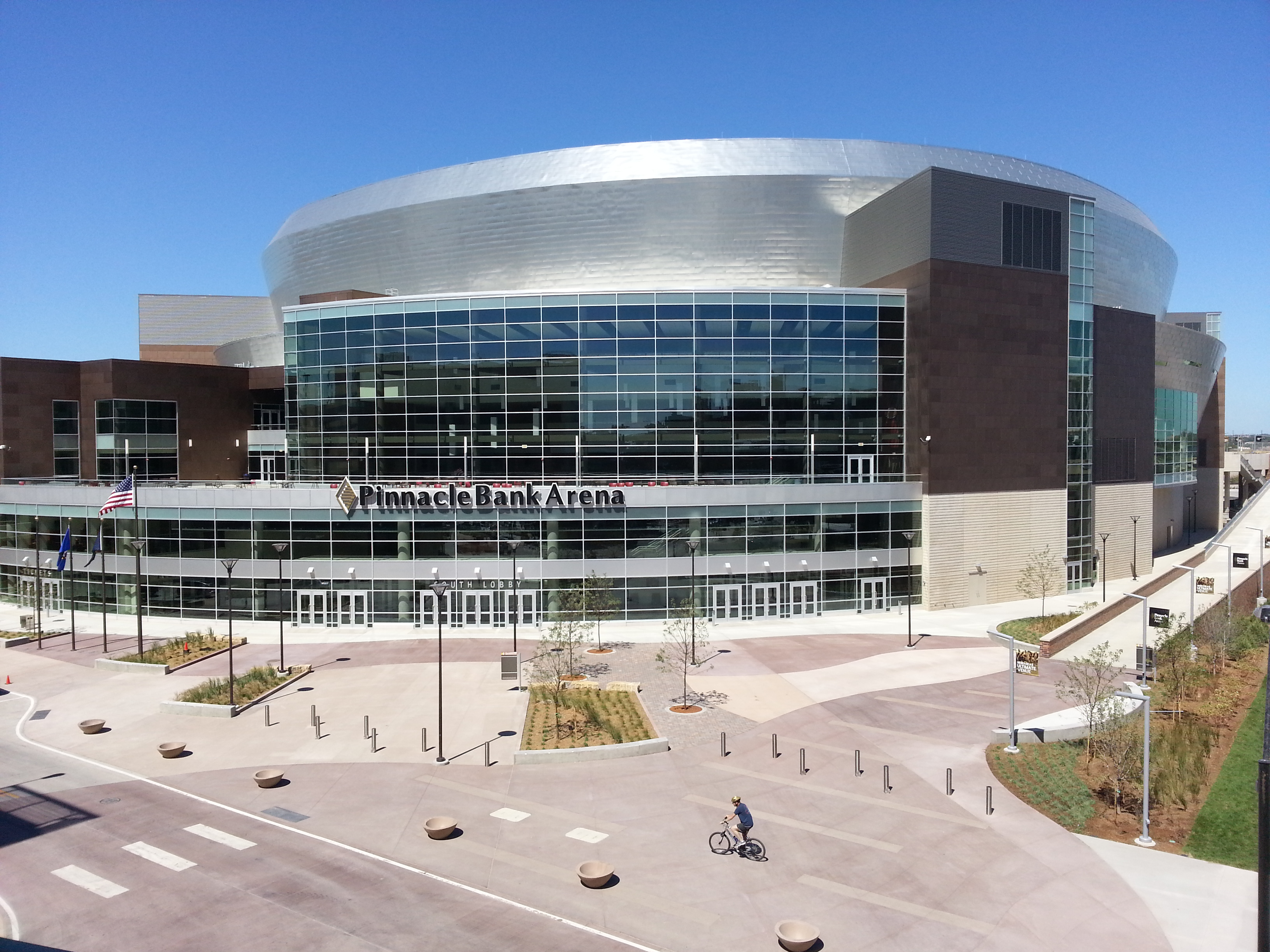
Pinnacle Bank Arena

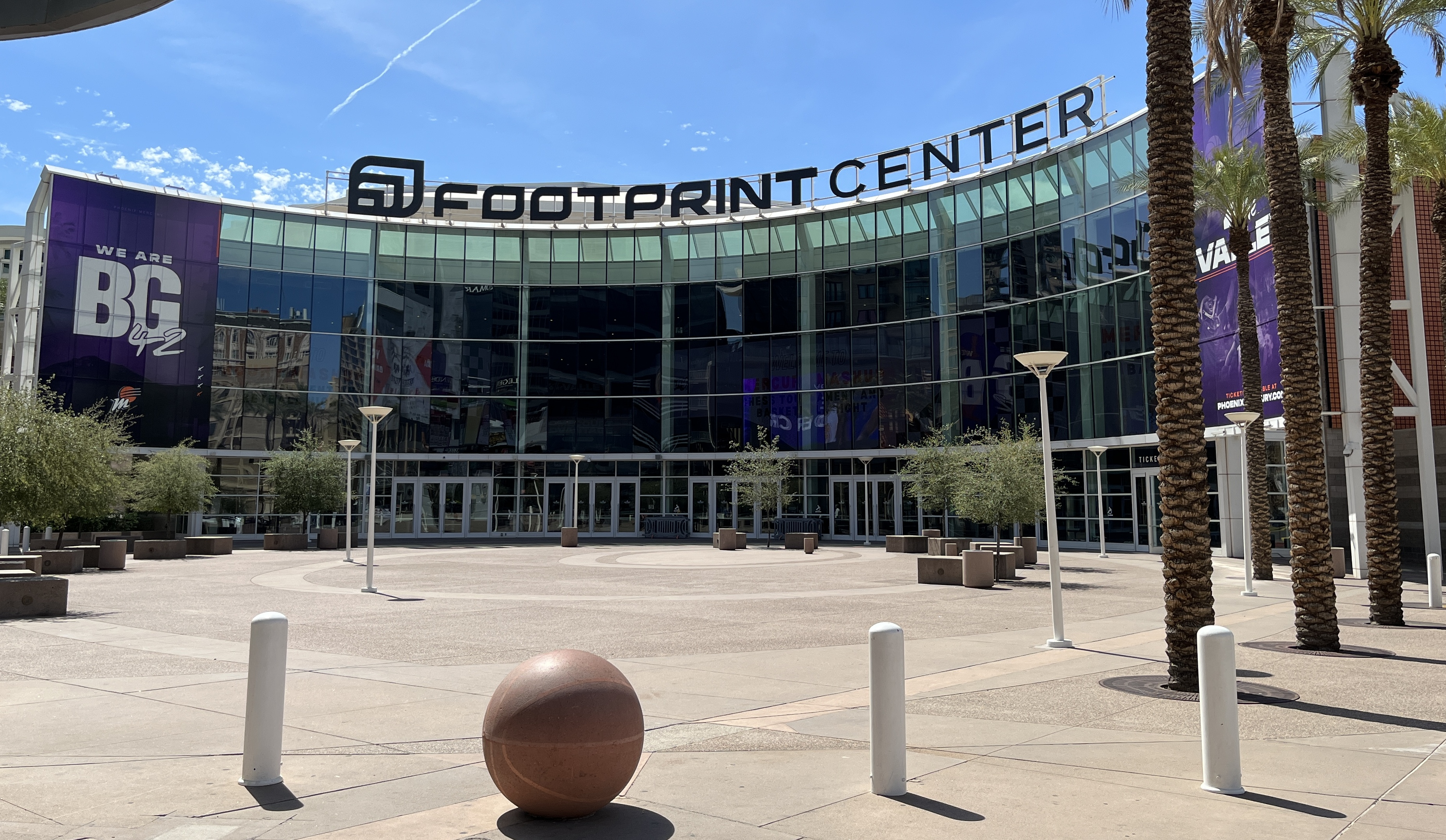
Mortgage Matchup Center

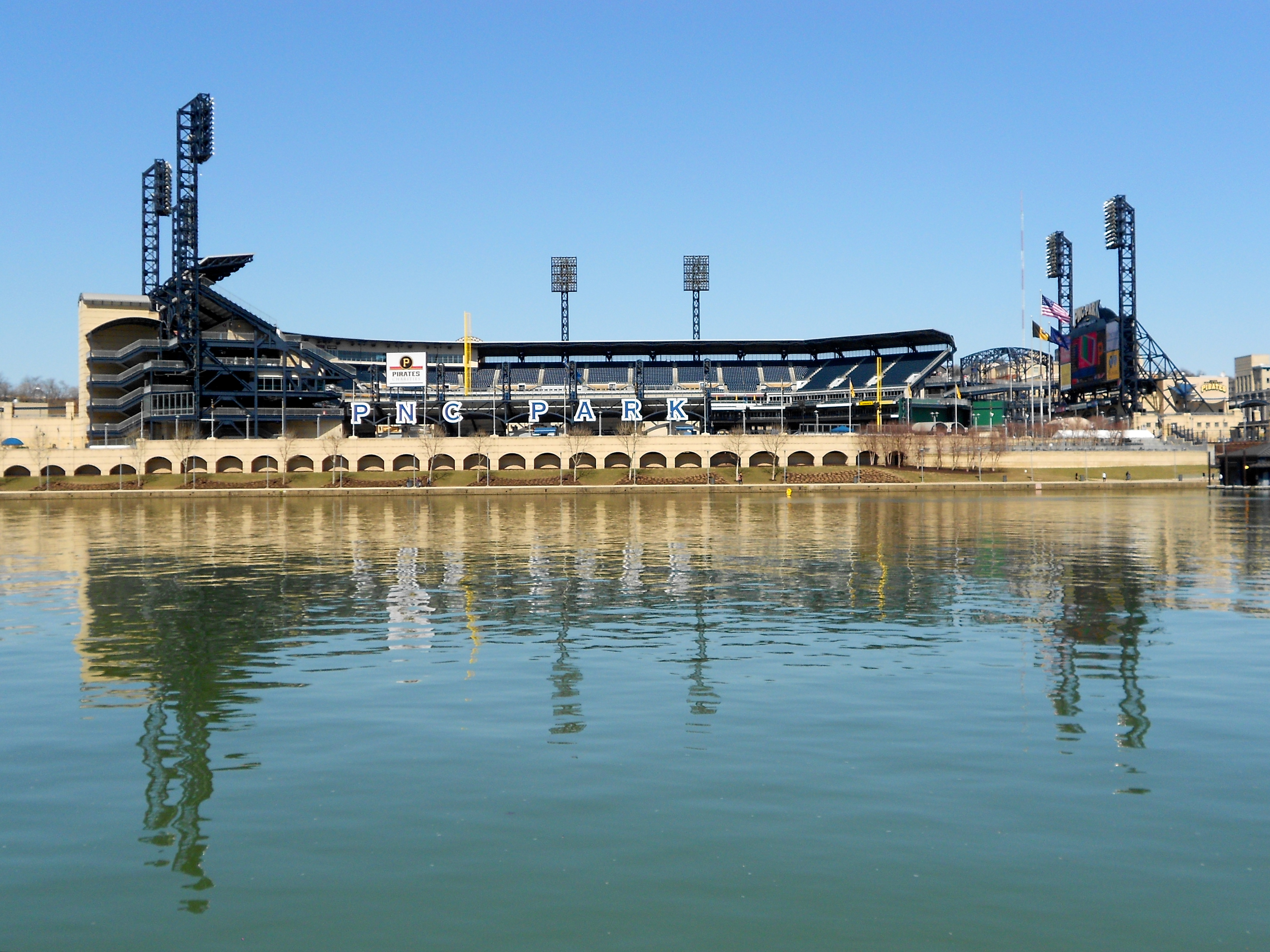
PNC Park

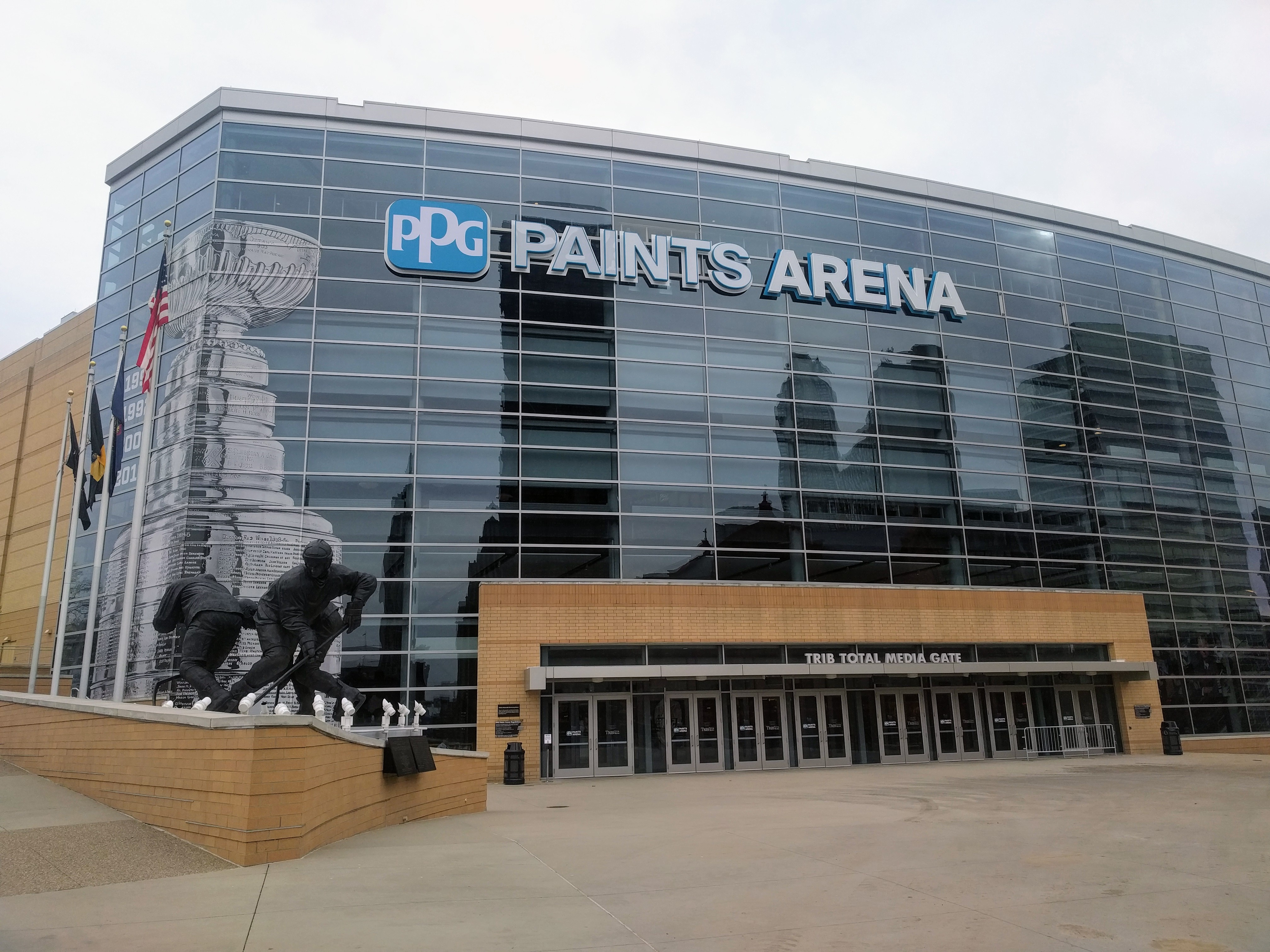
PPG Paints Arena

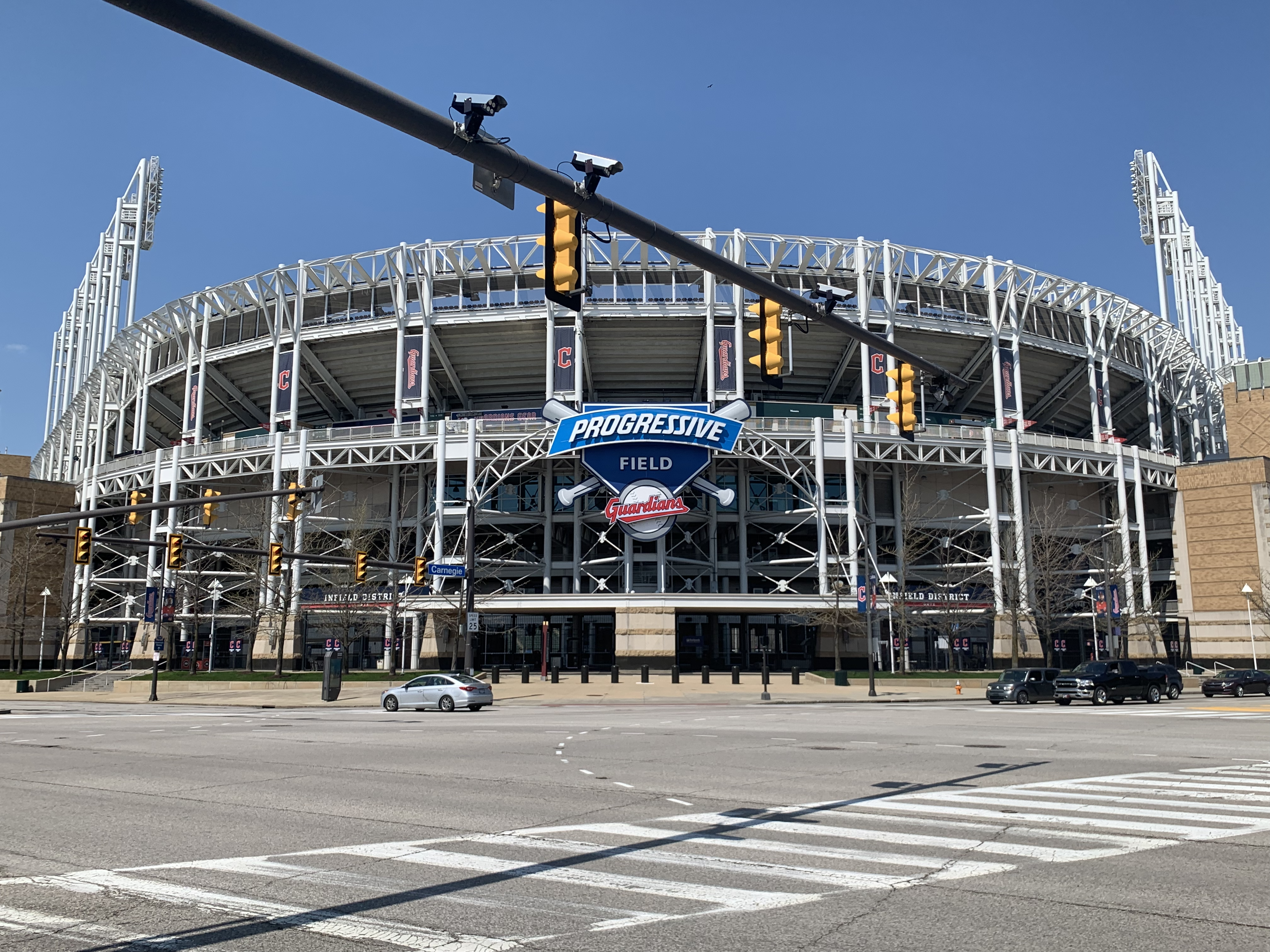
Progressive Field

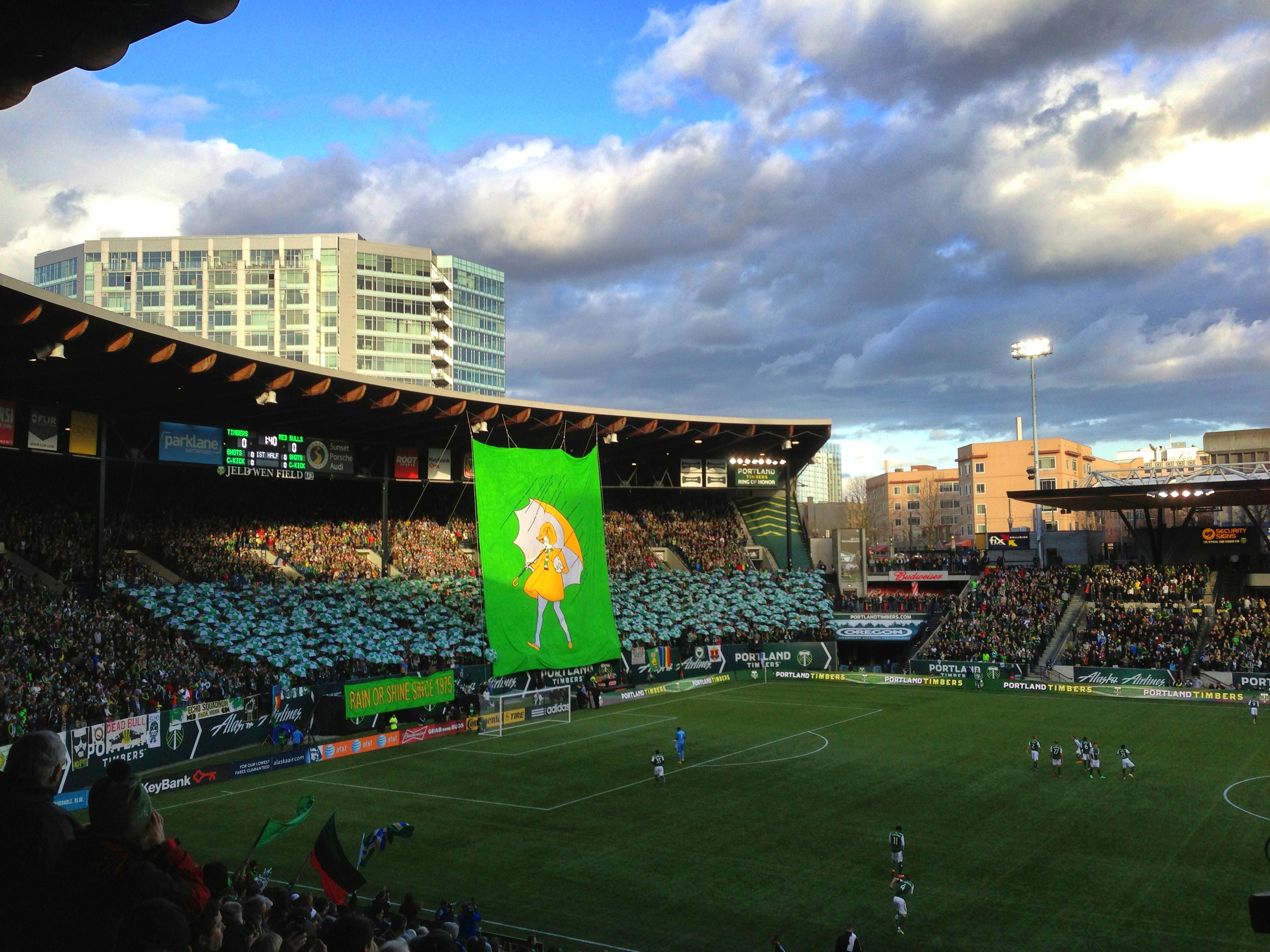
Providence Park

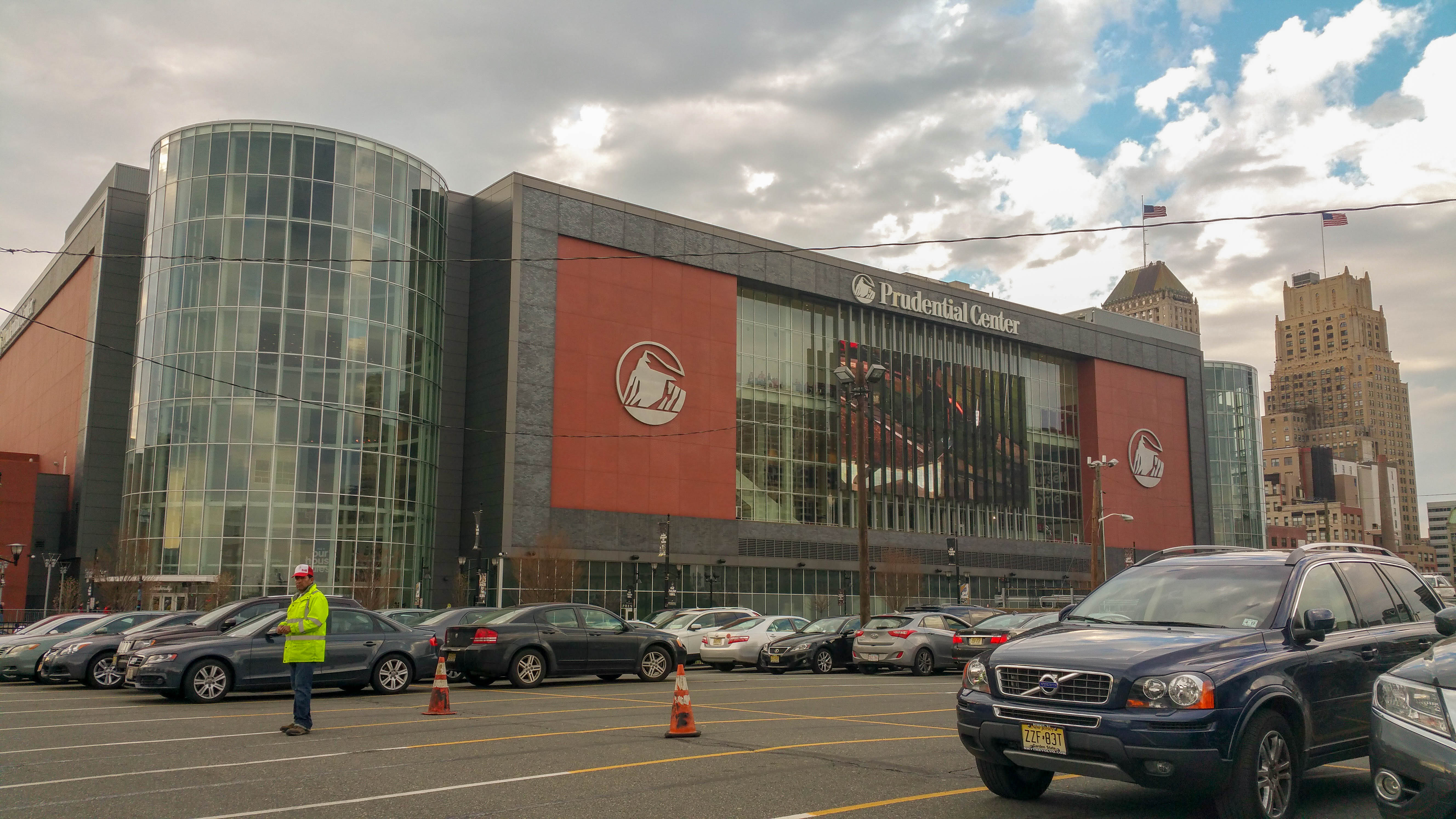
Prudential Center

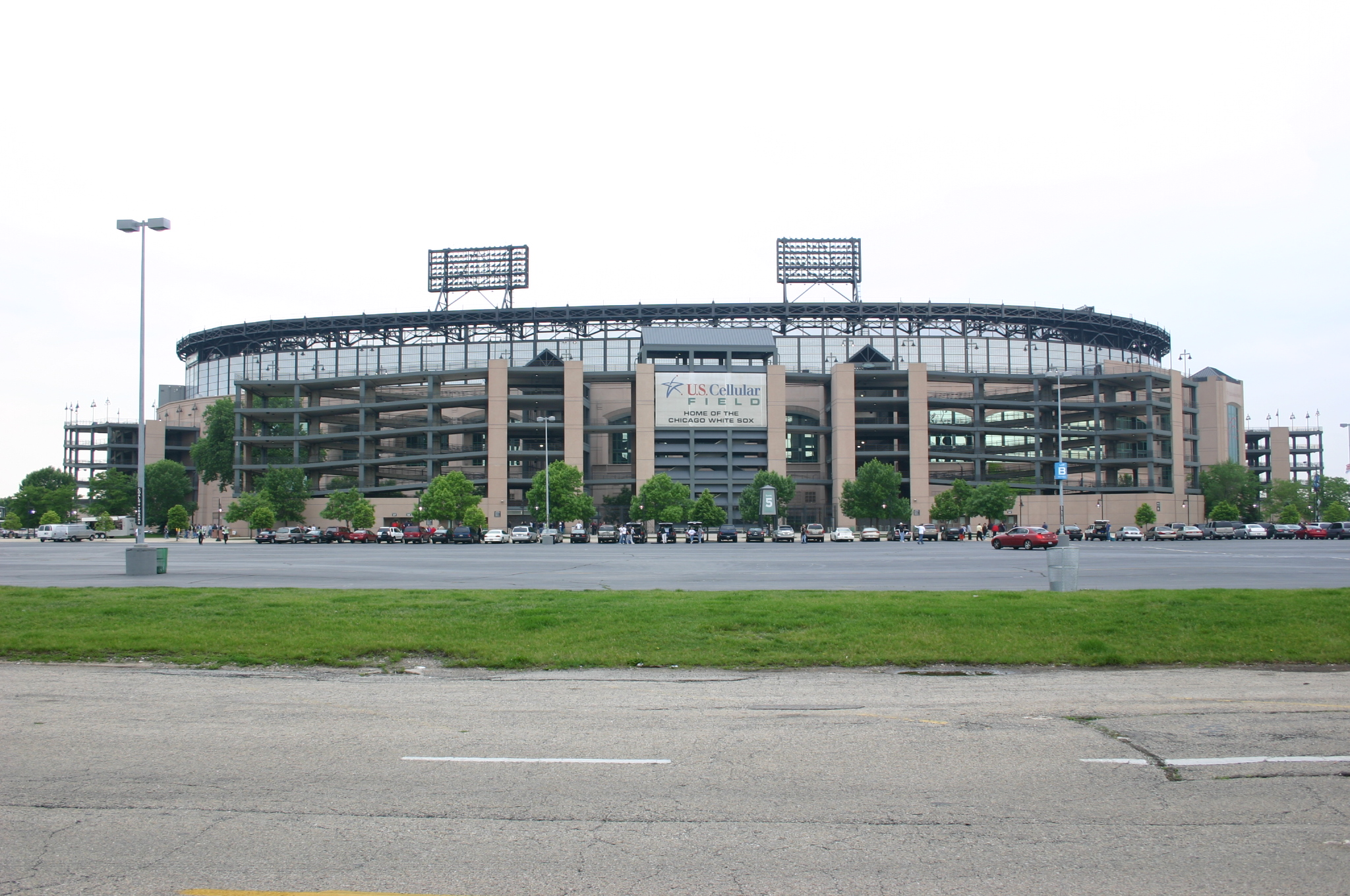
Rate Field

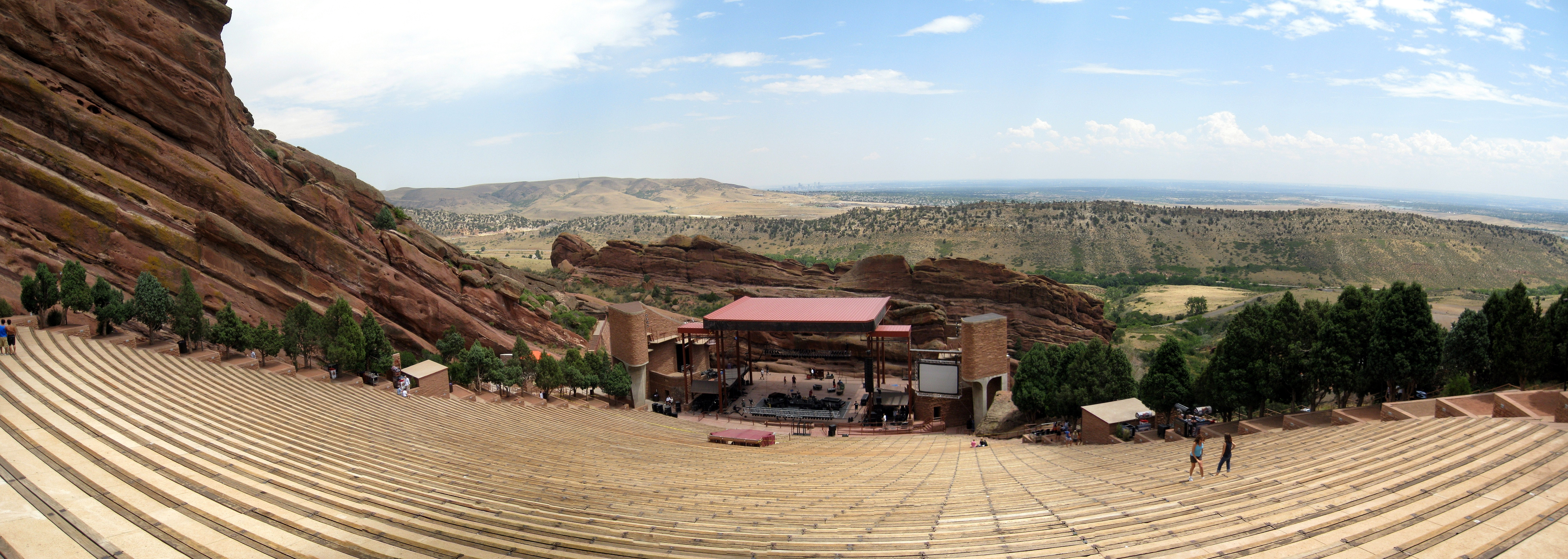
Red Rocks Amphitheatre

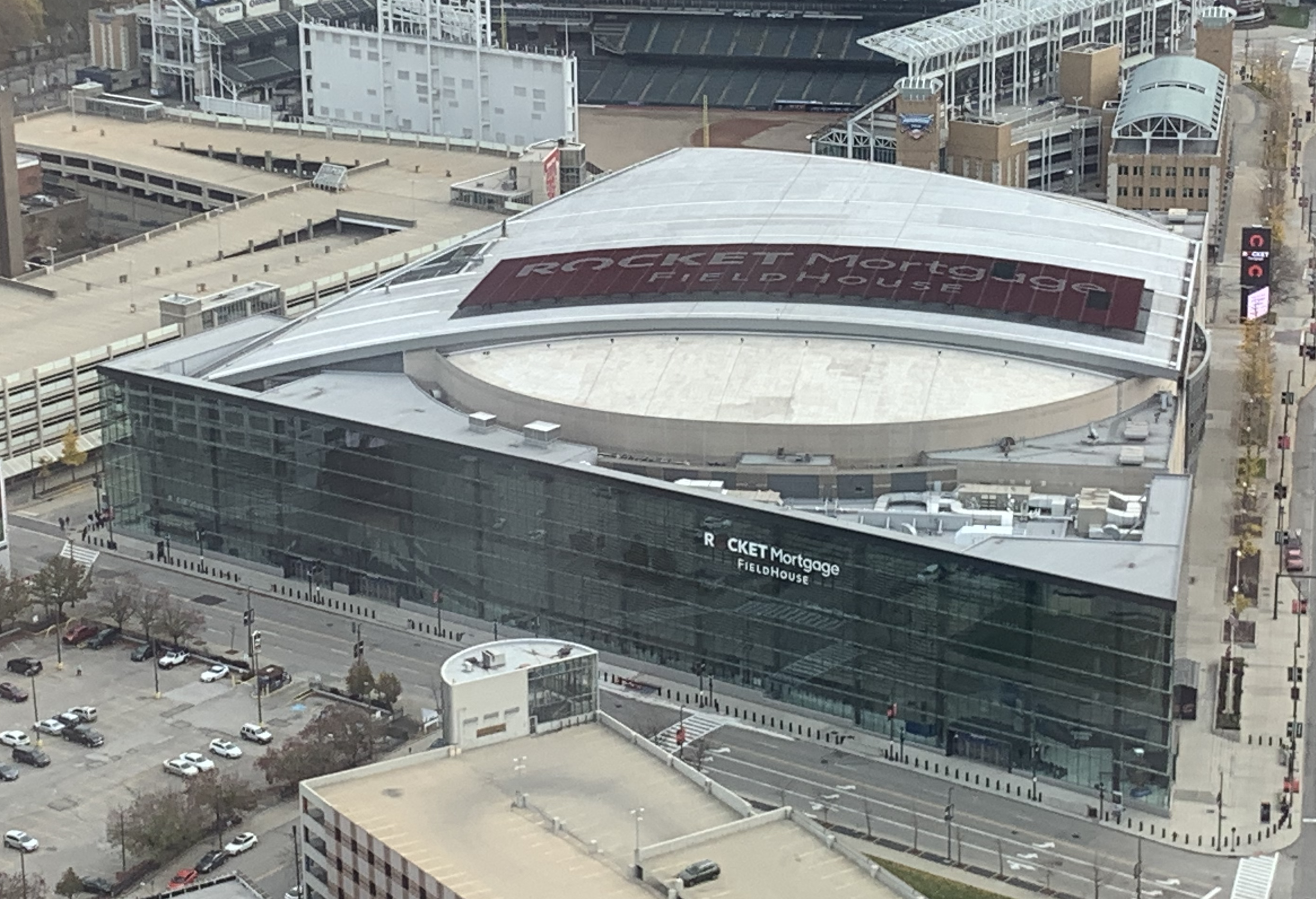
Rocket Mortgage FieldHouse

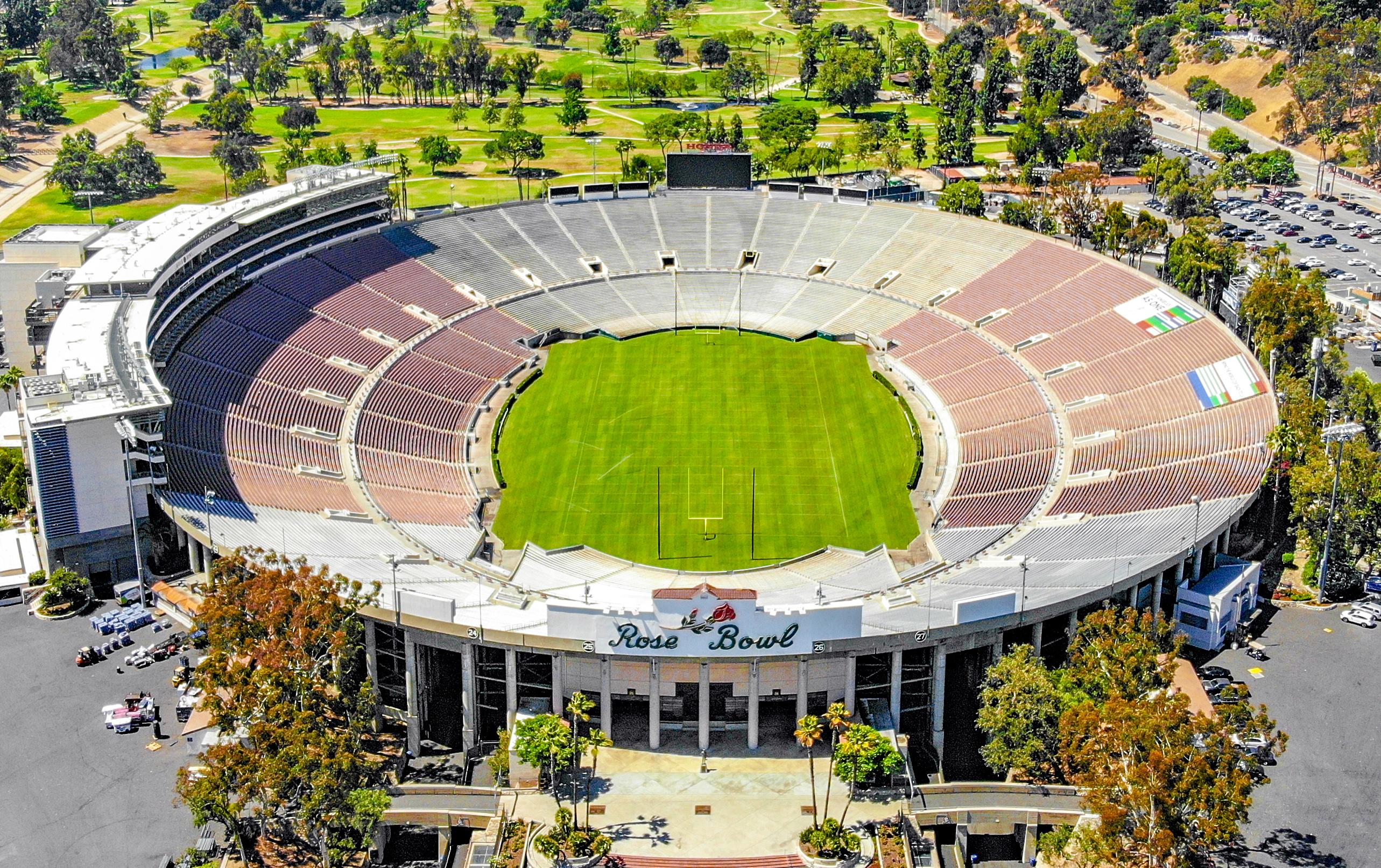
Rose Bowl

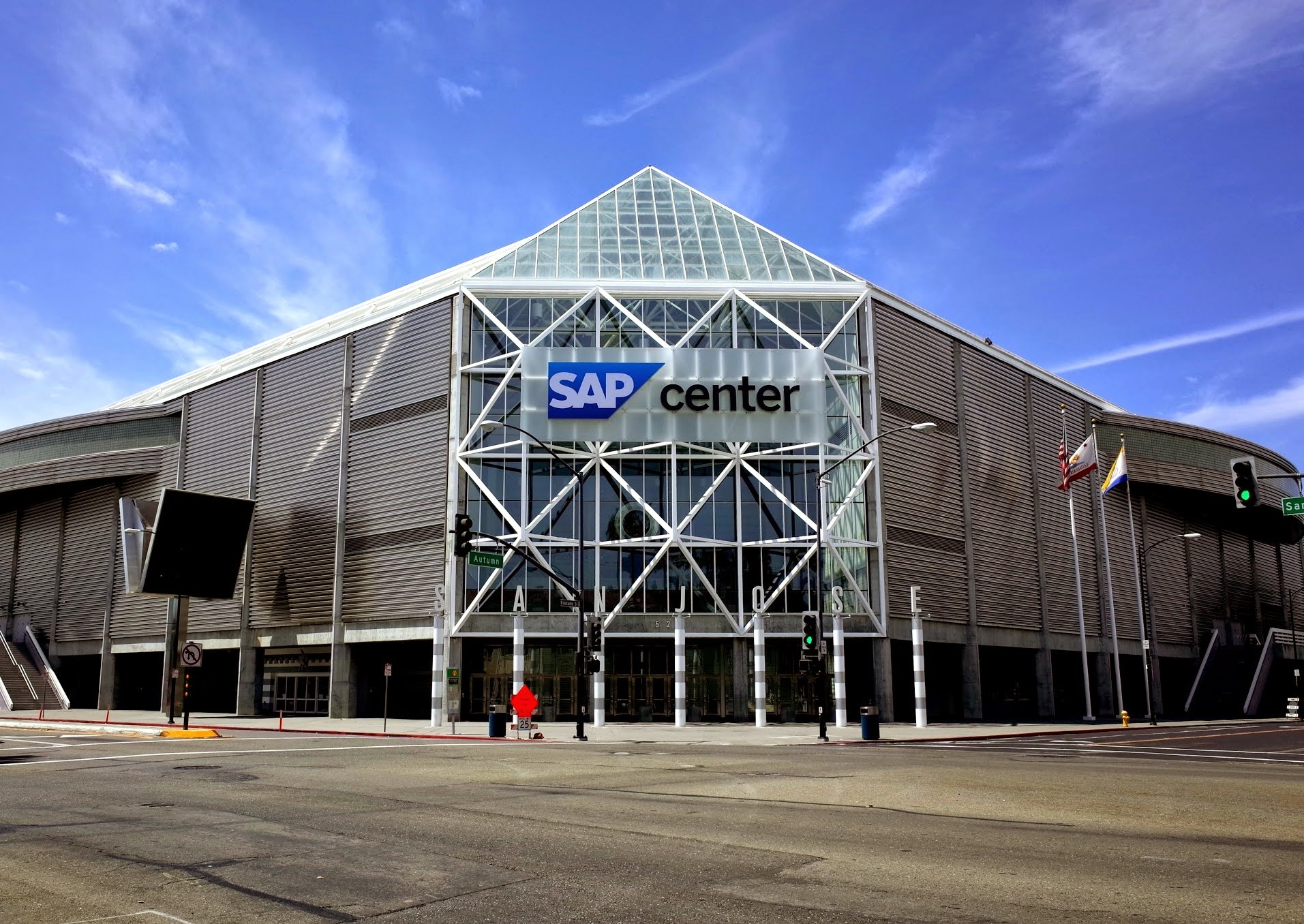
SAP Center

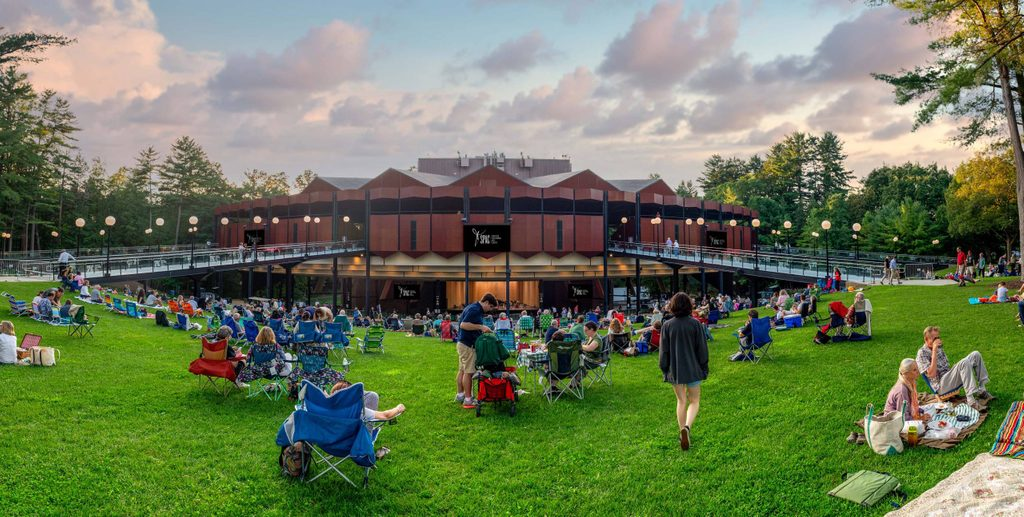
Saratoga Performing Arts Center

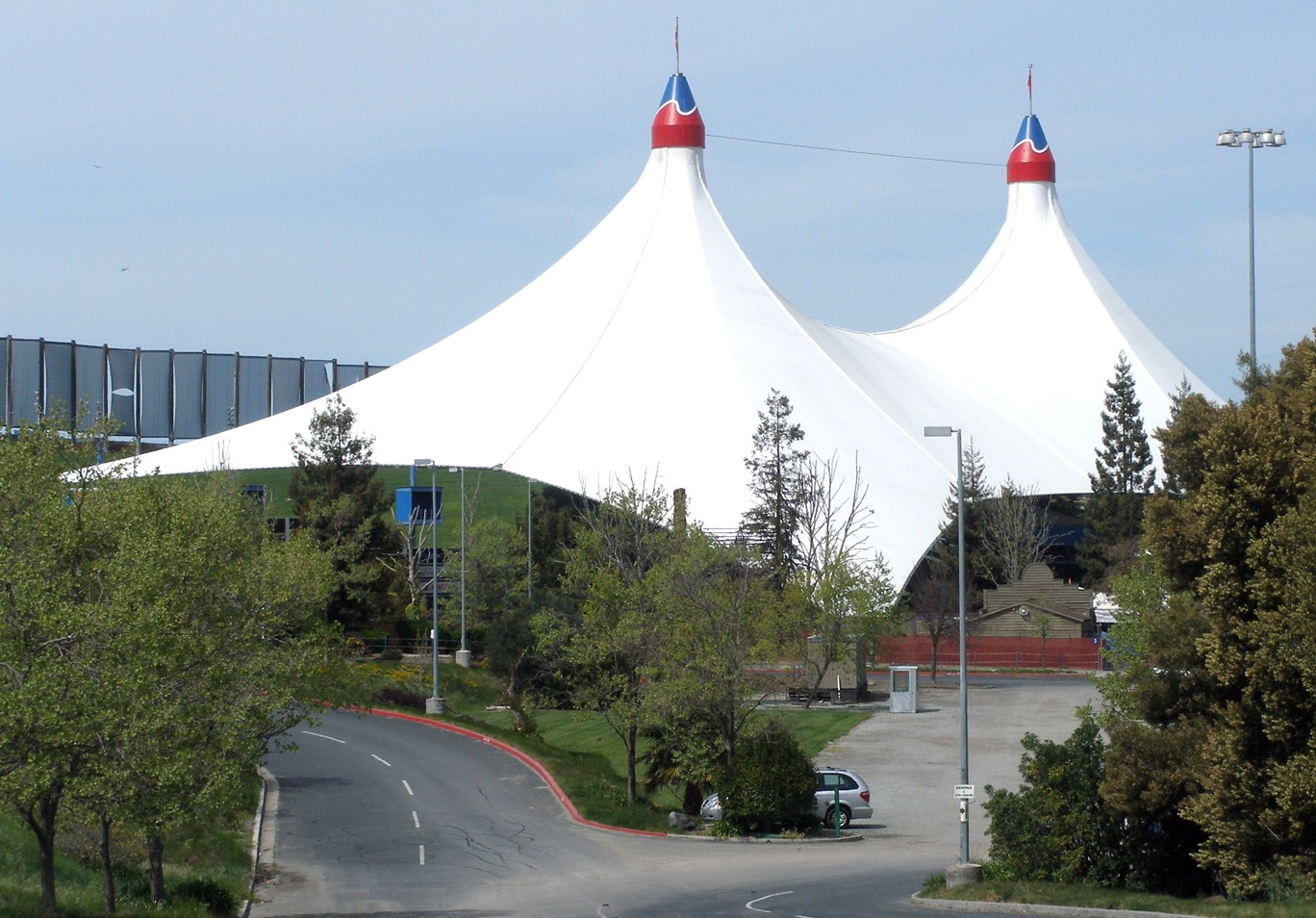
Shoreline Amphitheatre

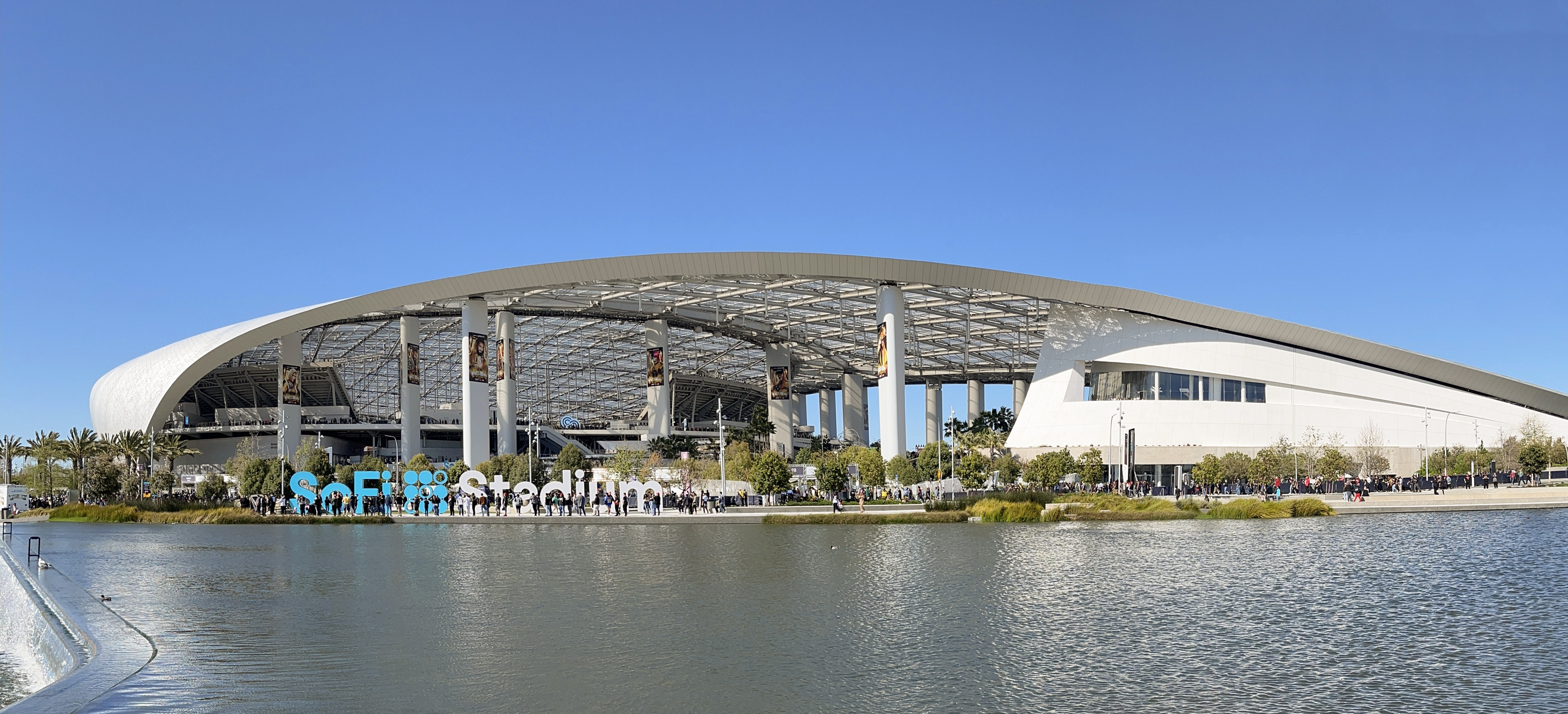
SoFi Stadium

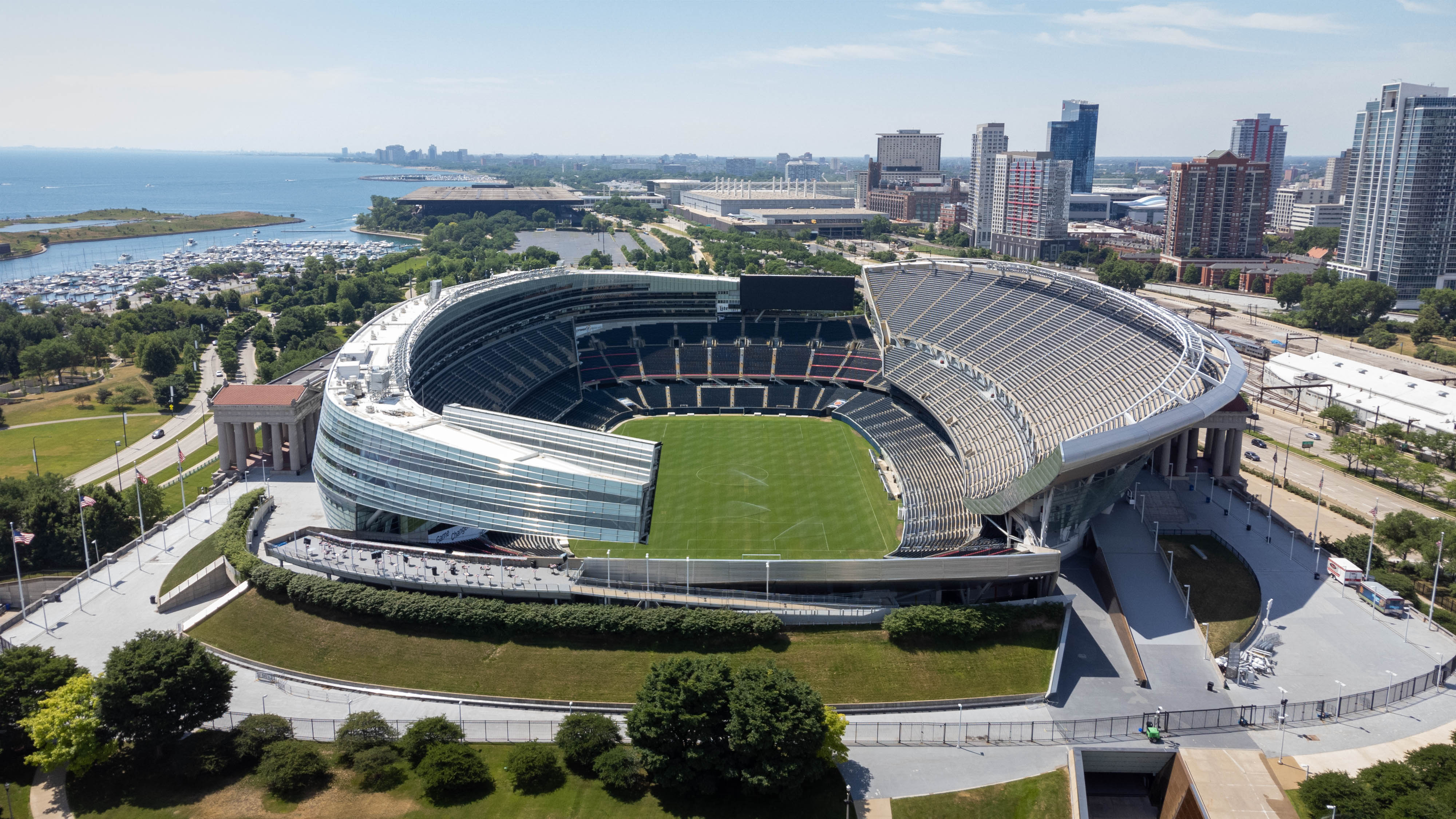
Soldier Field

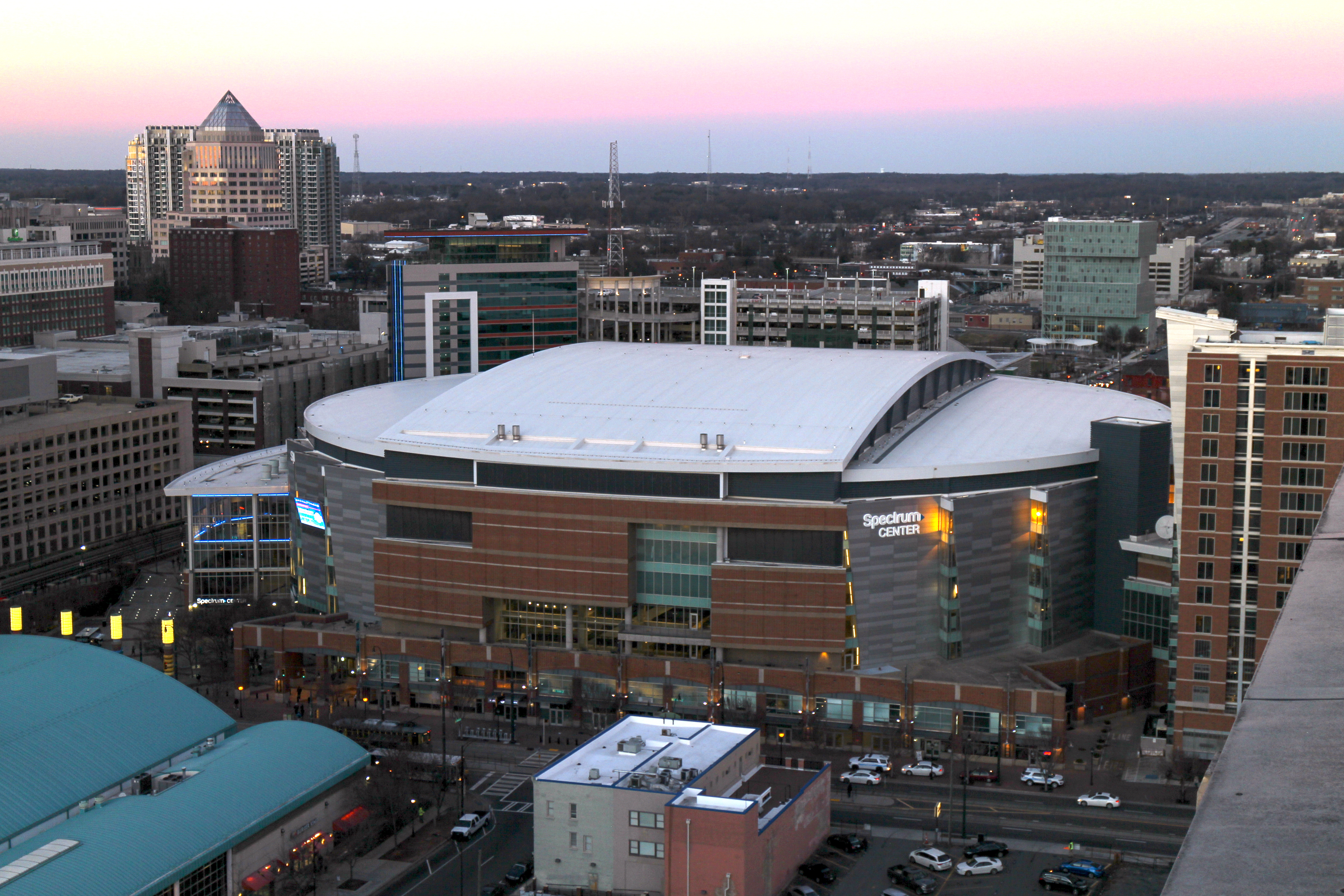
Spectrum Center

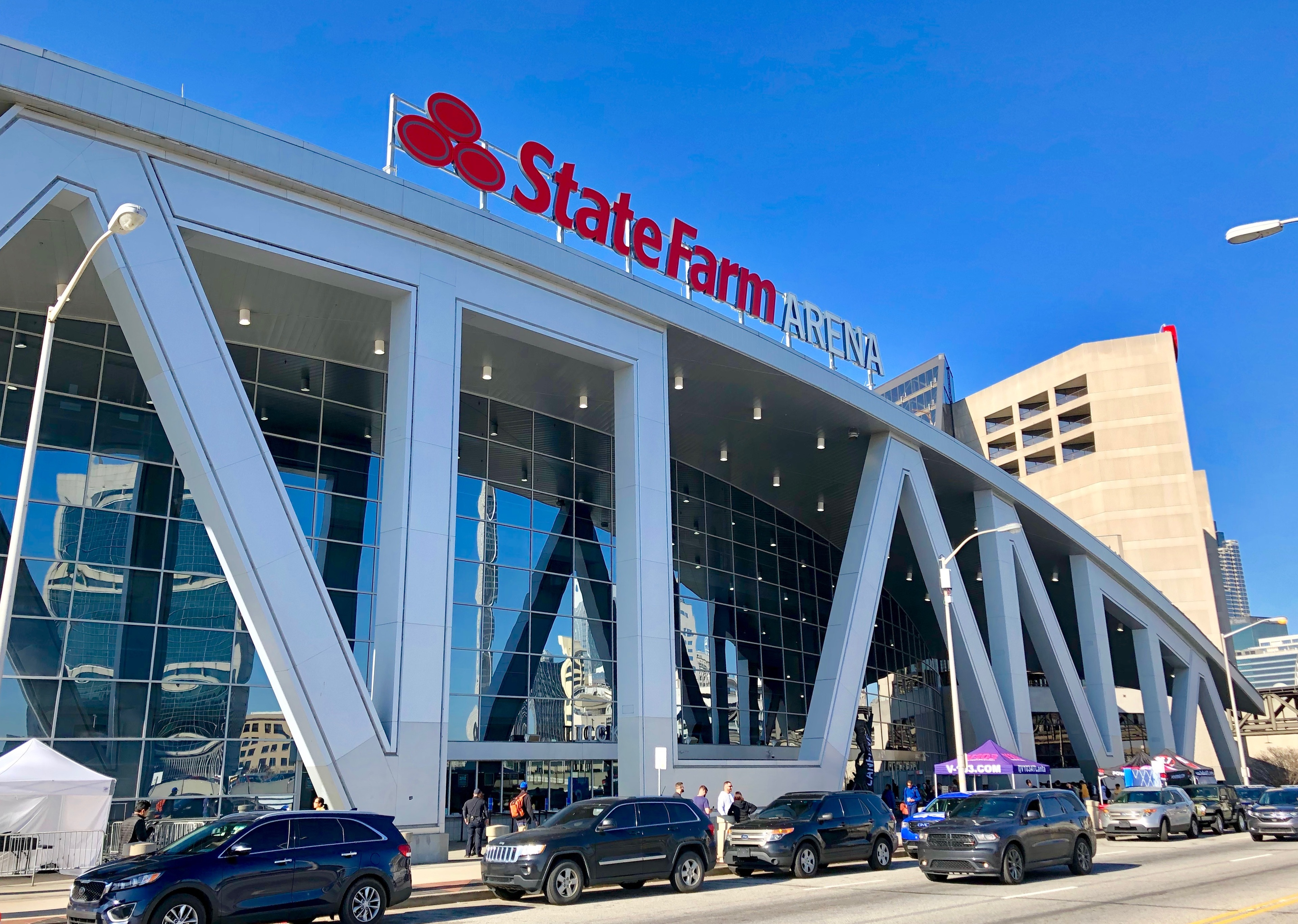
State Farm Arena

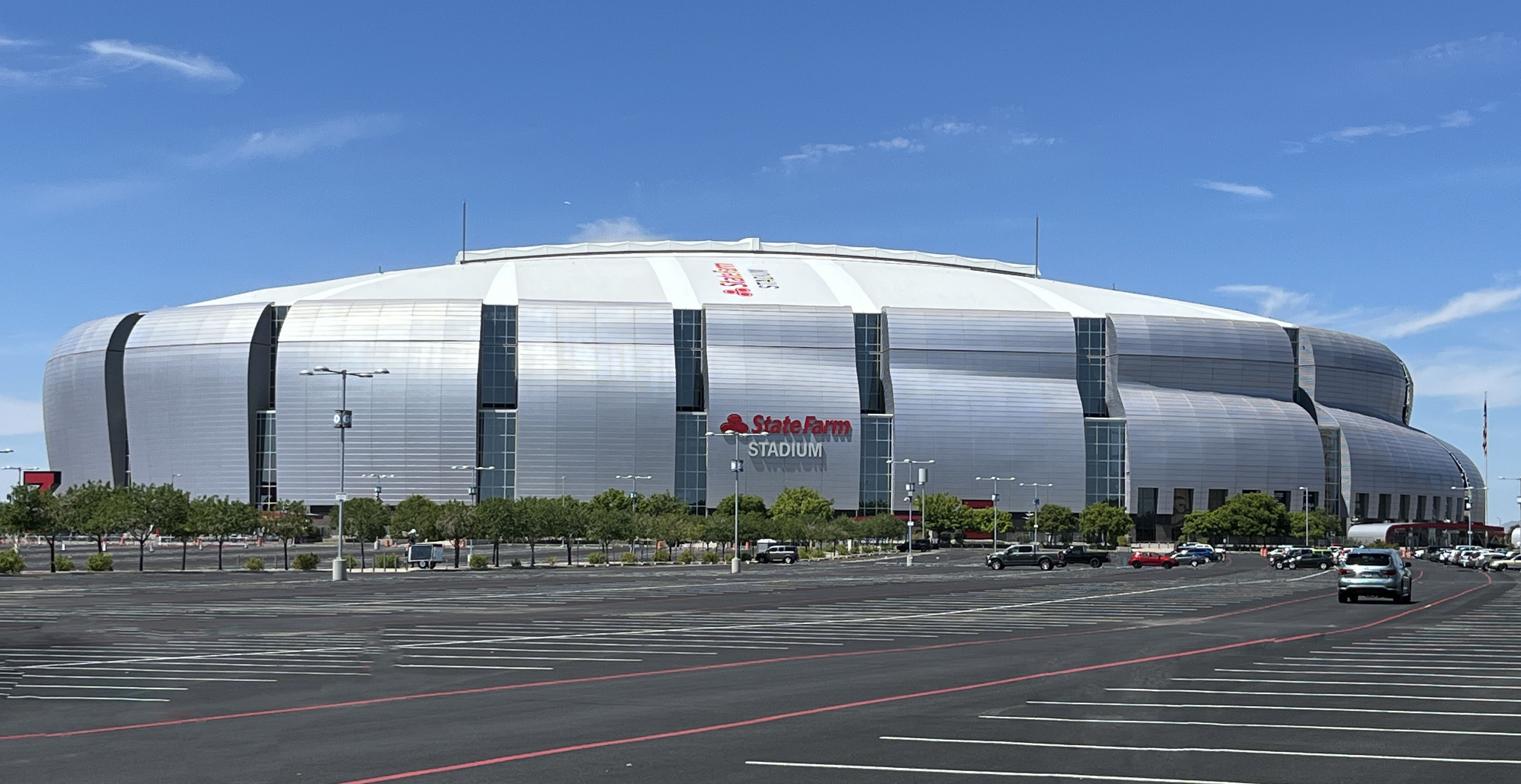
State Farm Stadium

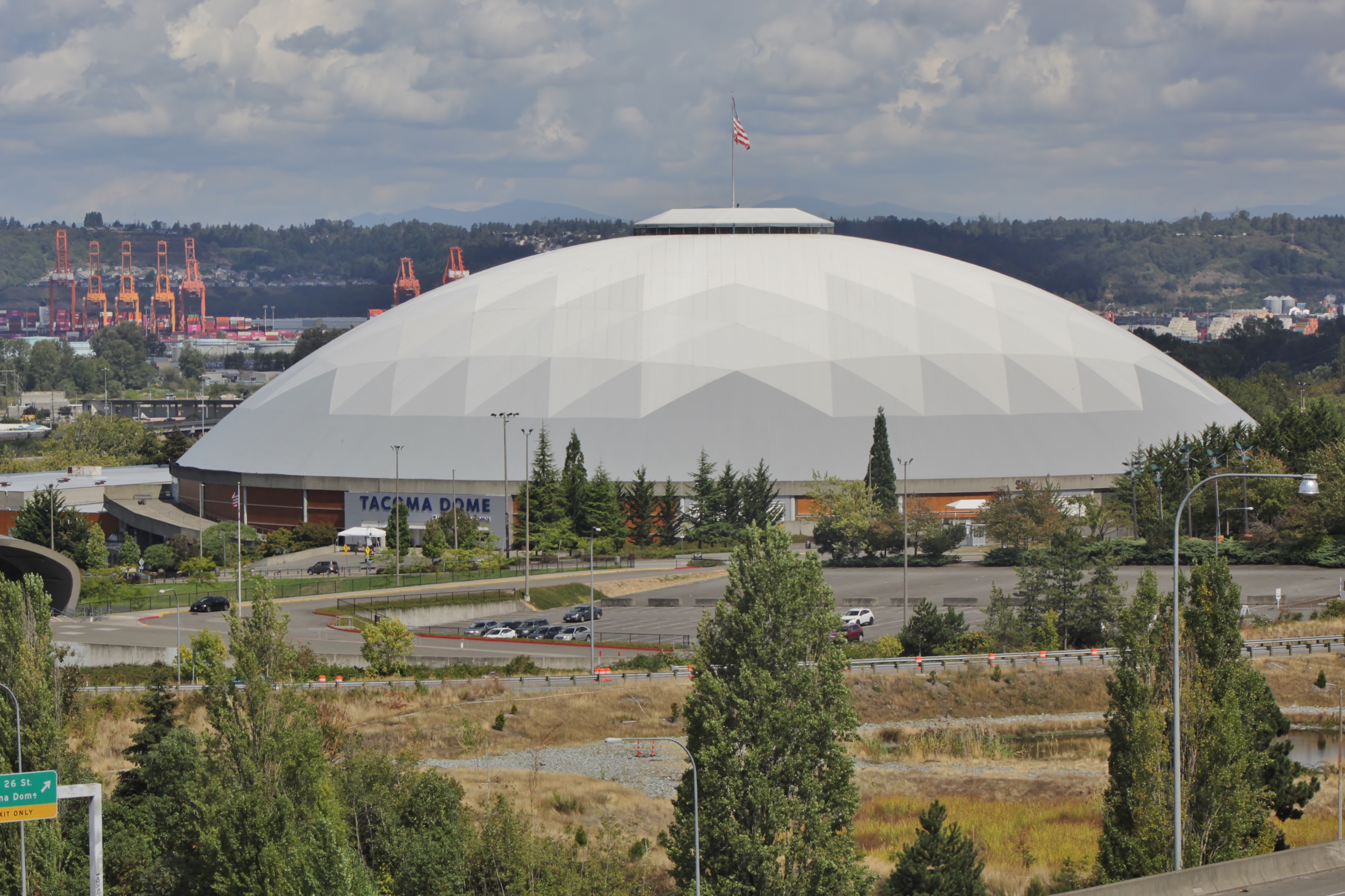
Tacoma Dome

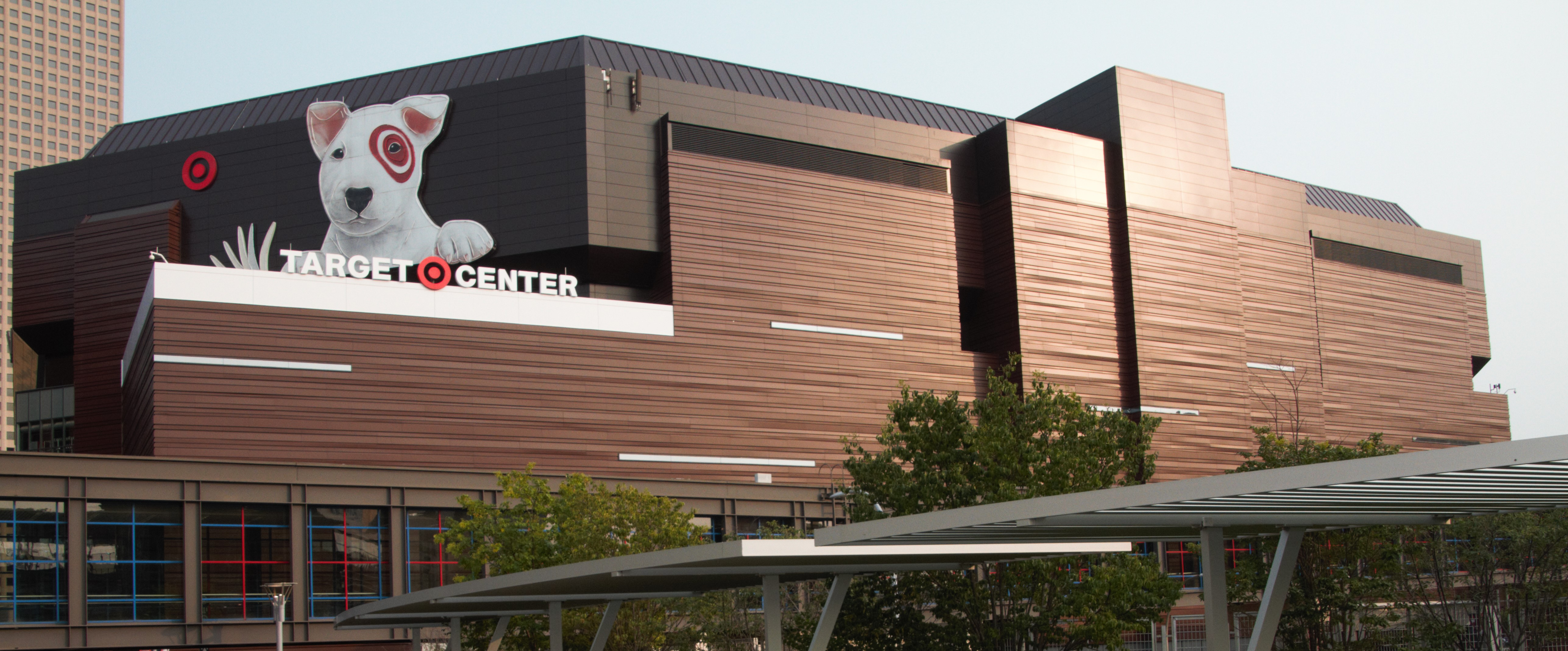
Target Center

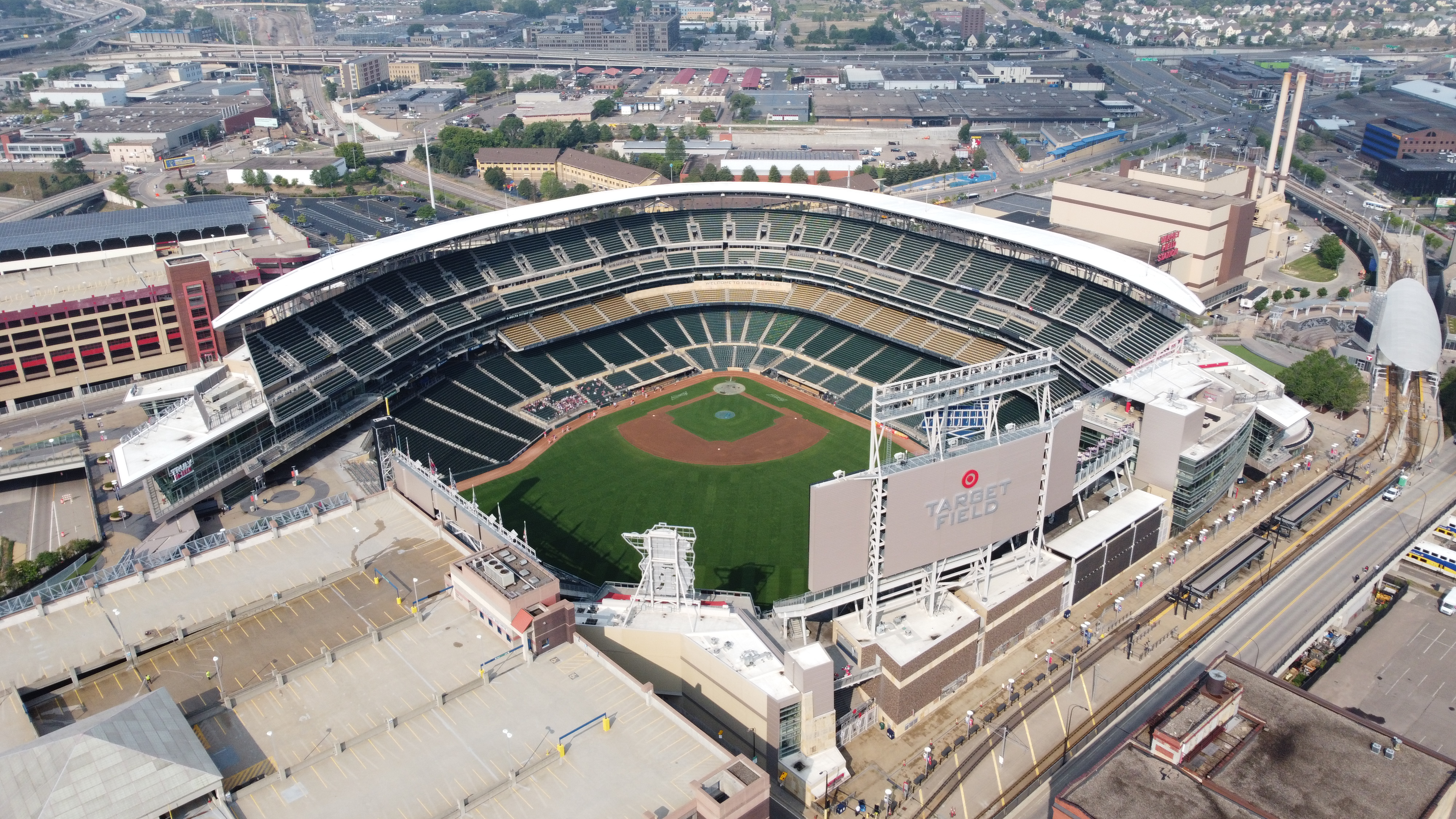
Target Field

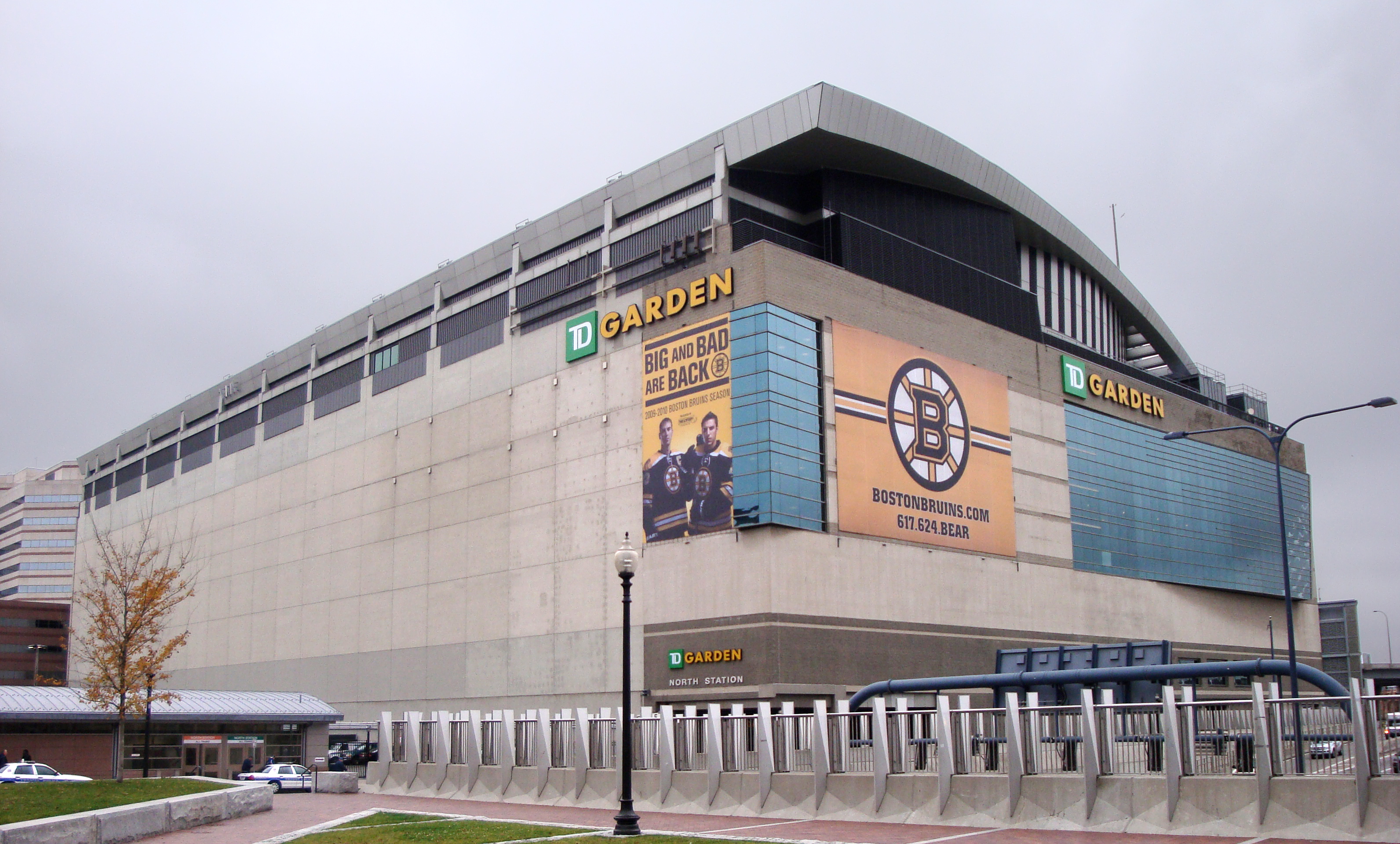
TD Garden

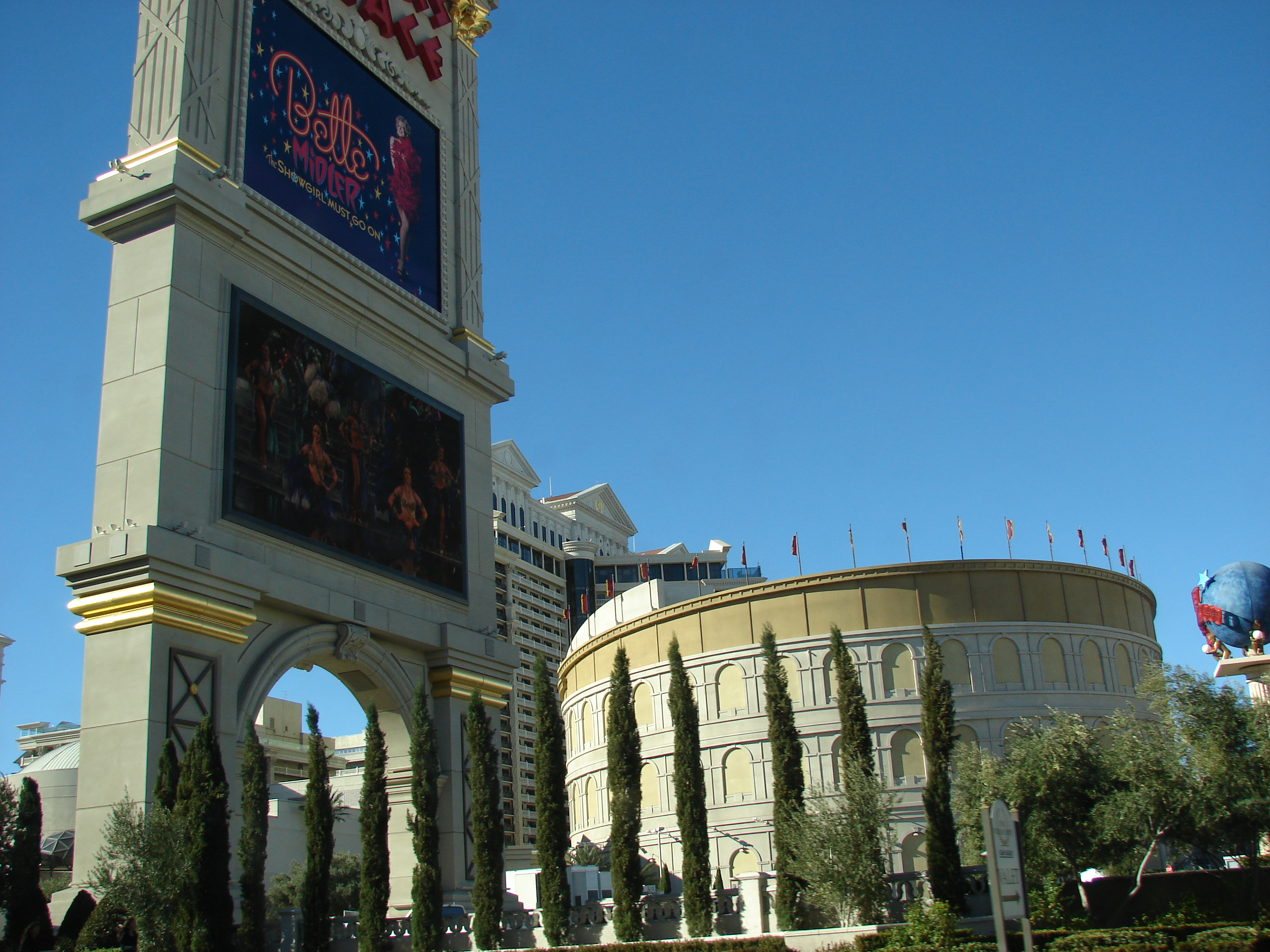
The Colosseum at Caesars Palace

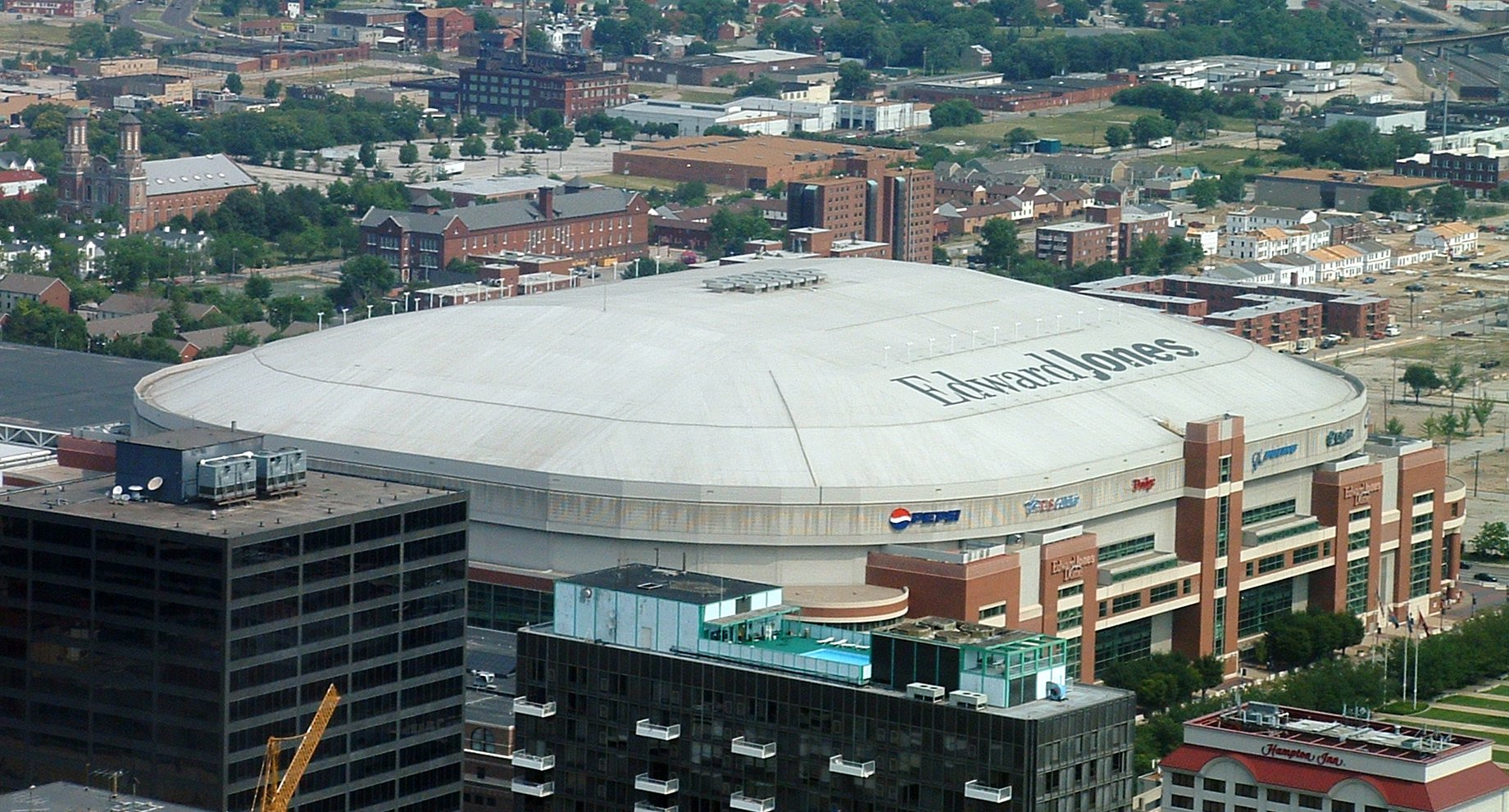
The Dome at America's Center

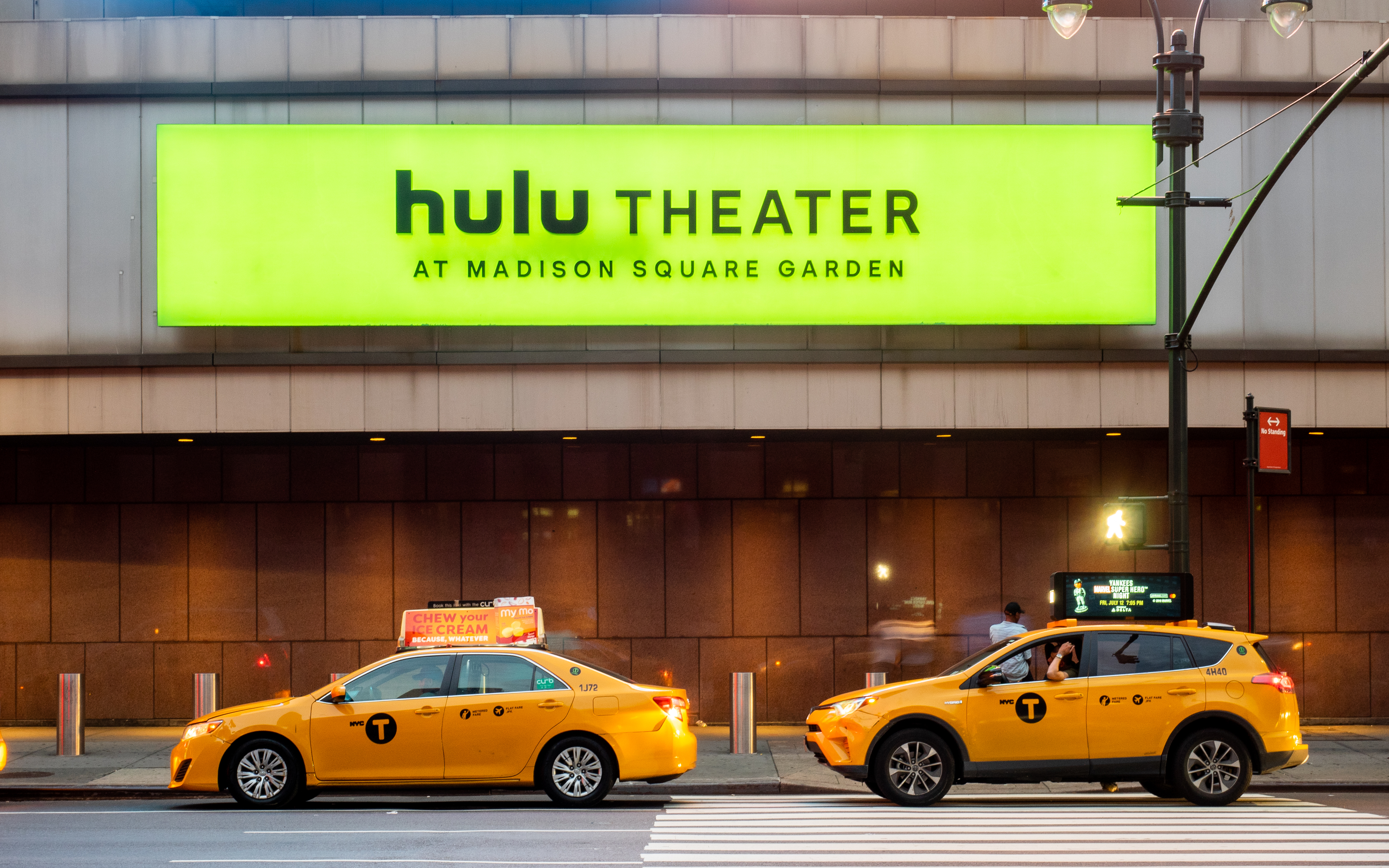
The Theater at Madison Square Garden

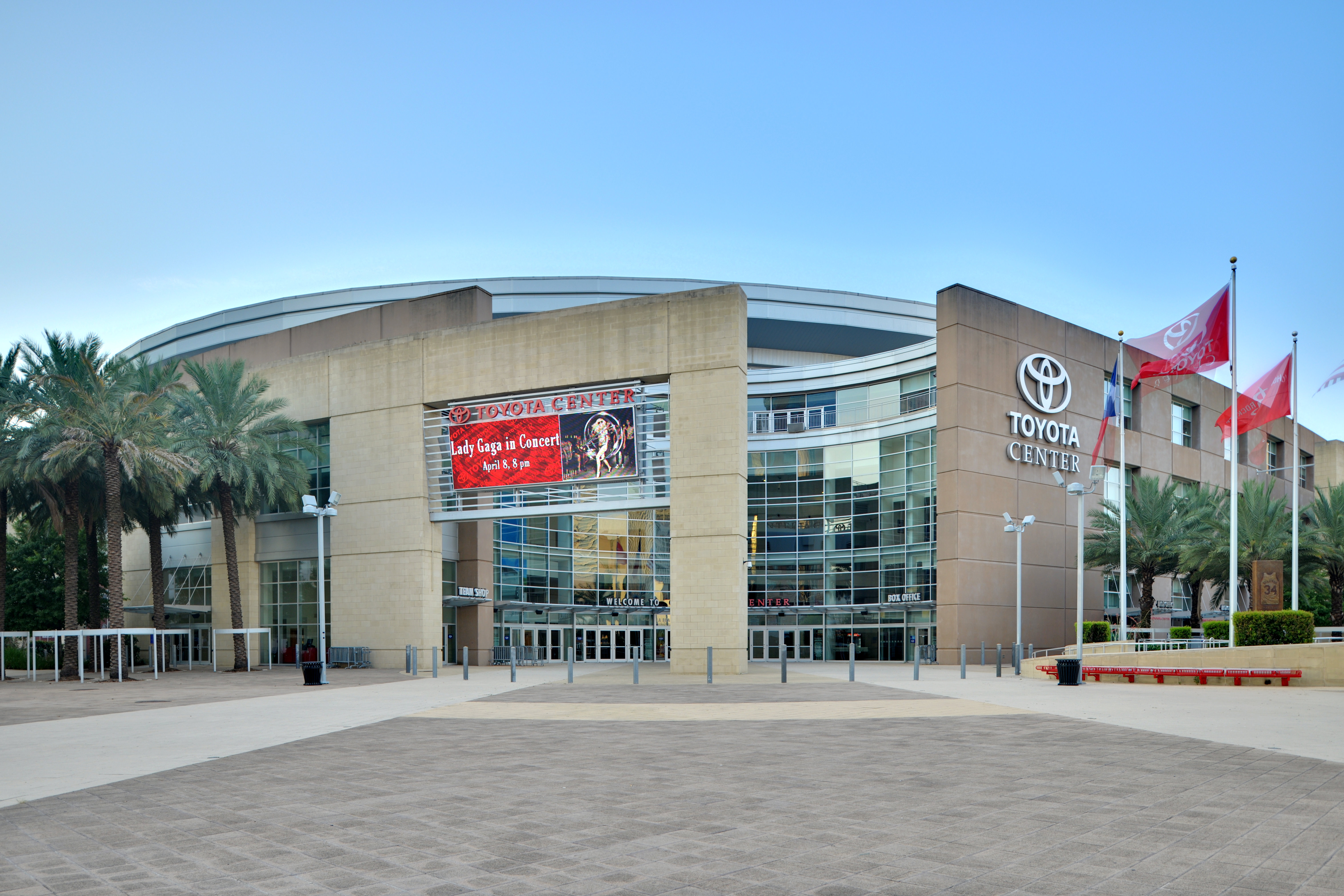
Toyota Center

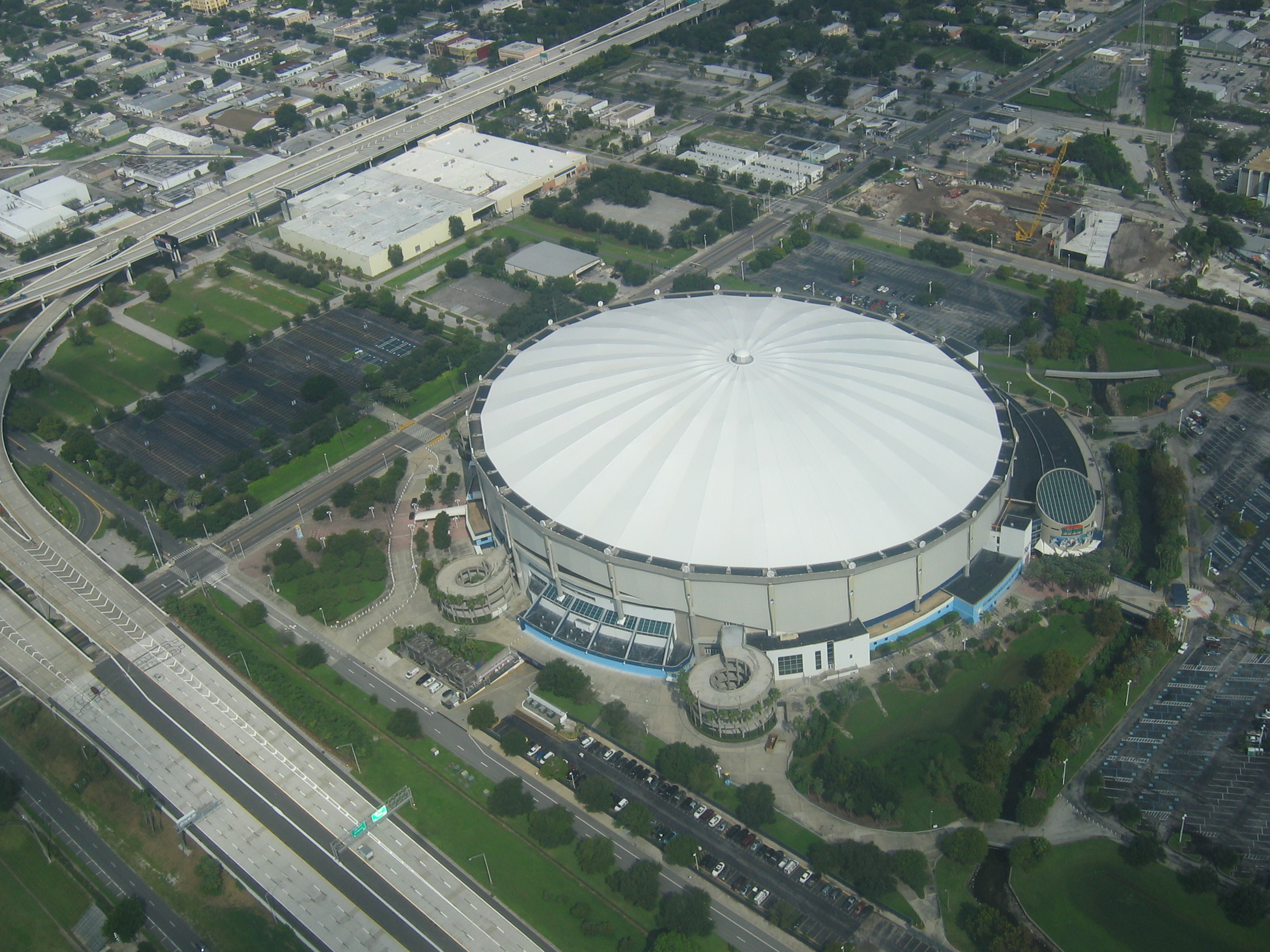
Tropicana Field

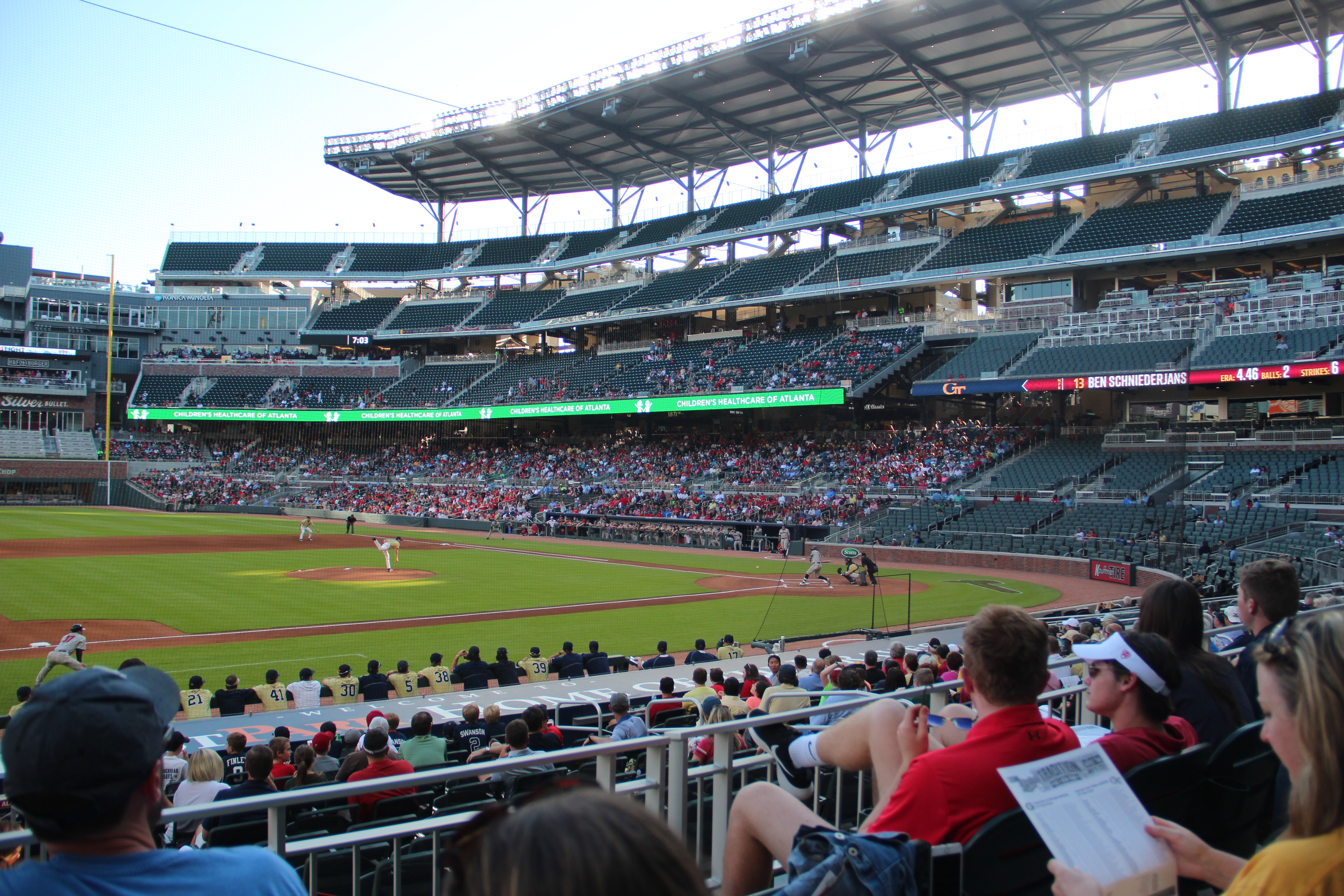
Truist Park

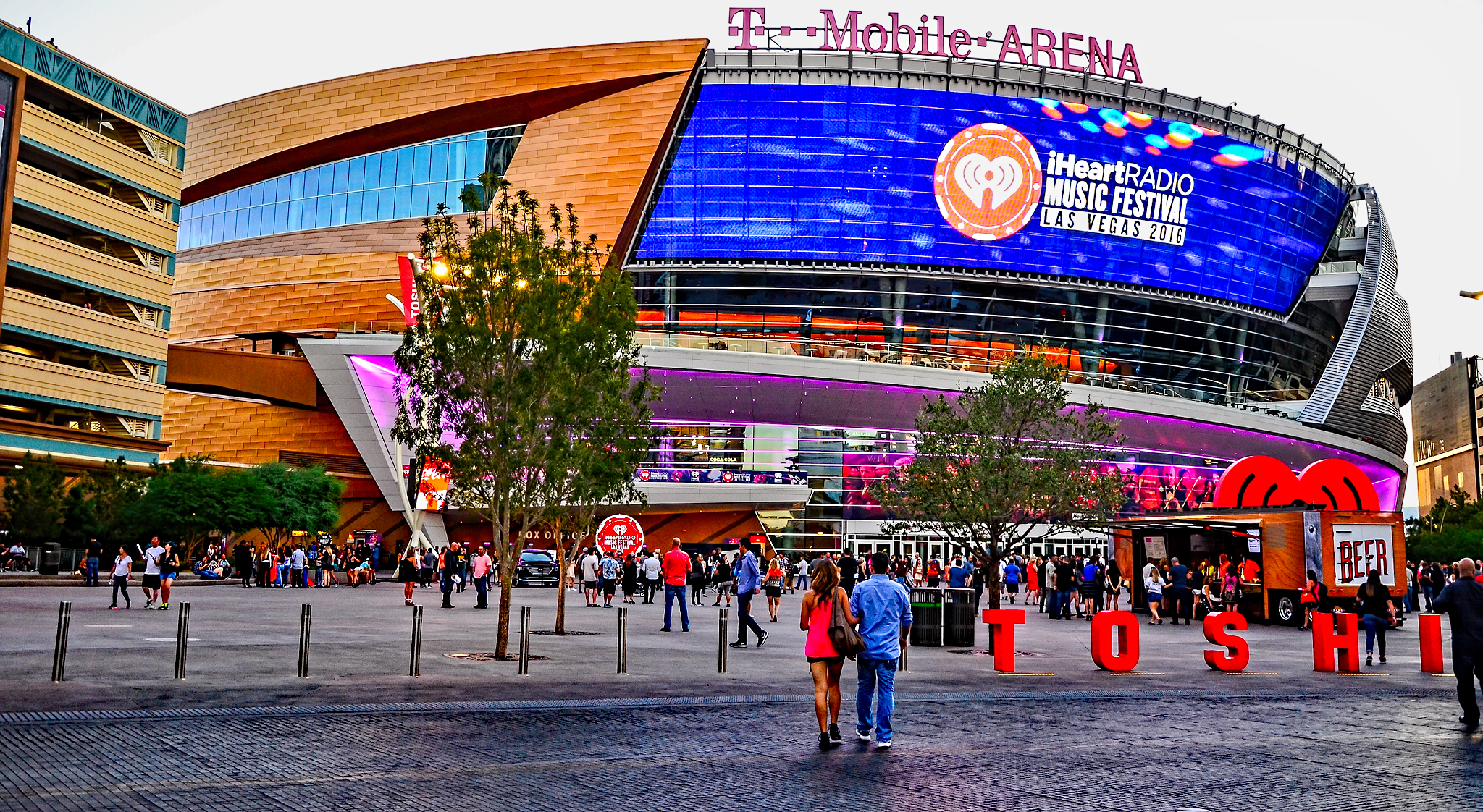
T-Mobile Arena

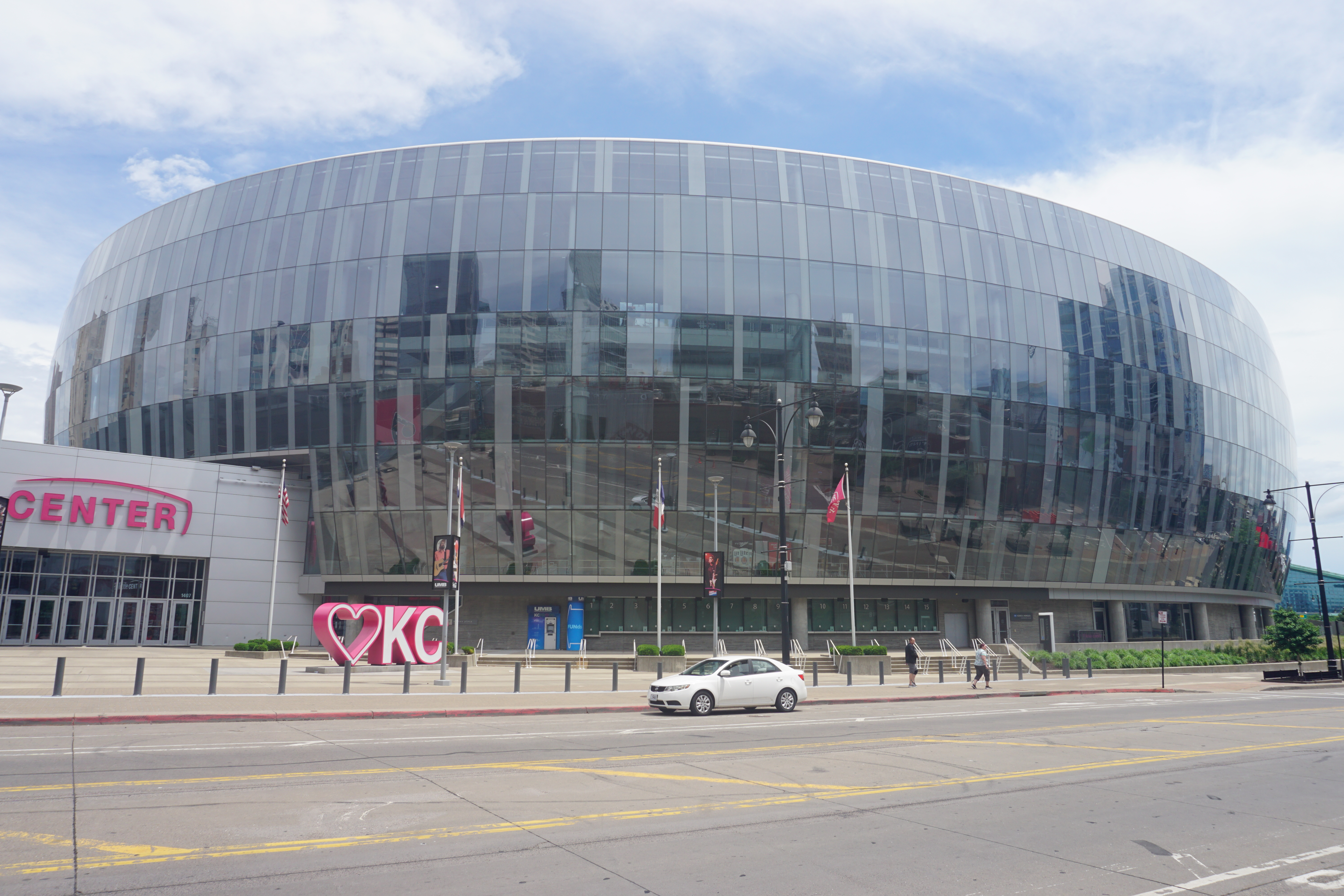
T-Mobile Center

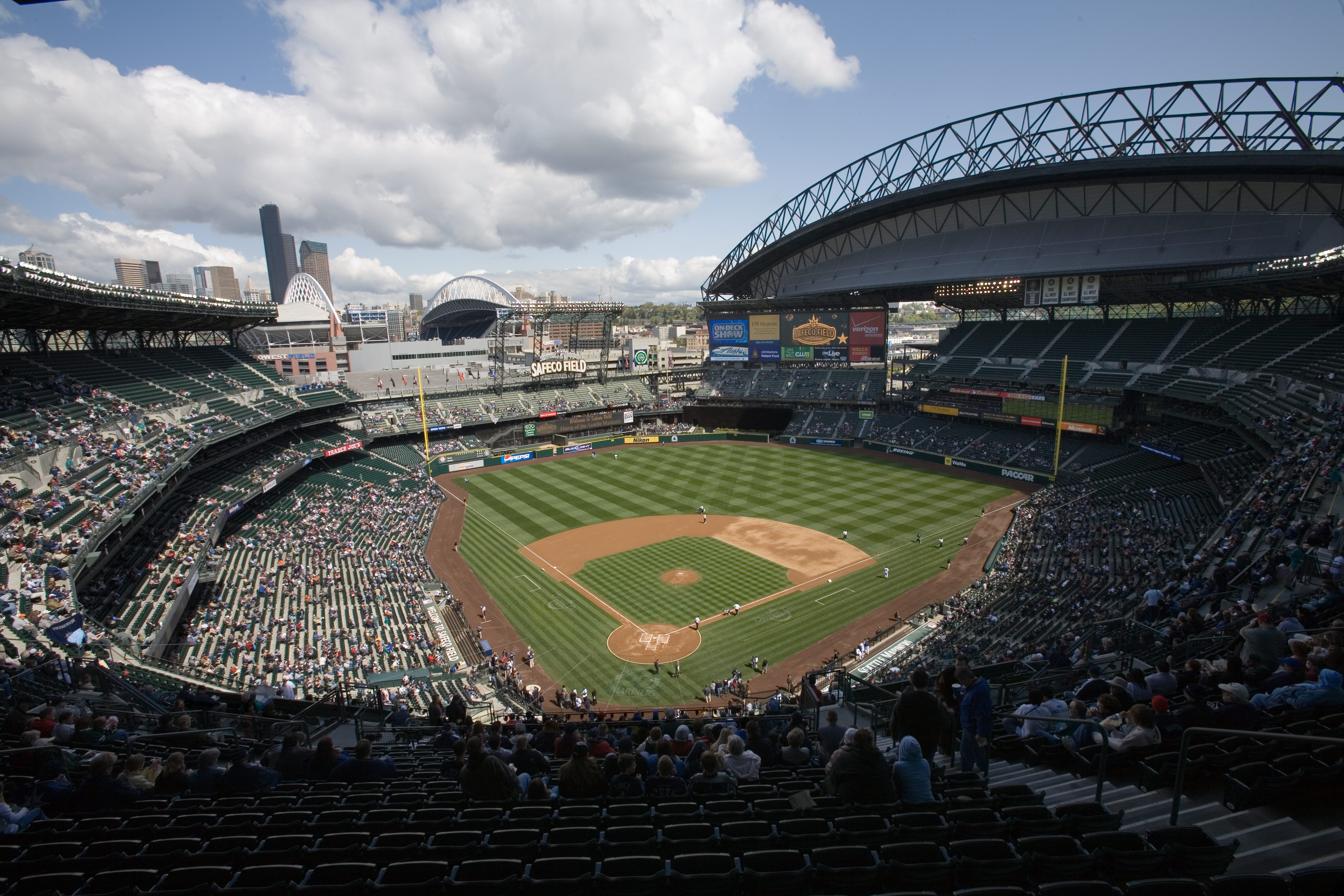
T-Mobile Park

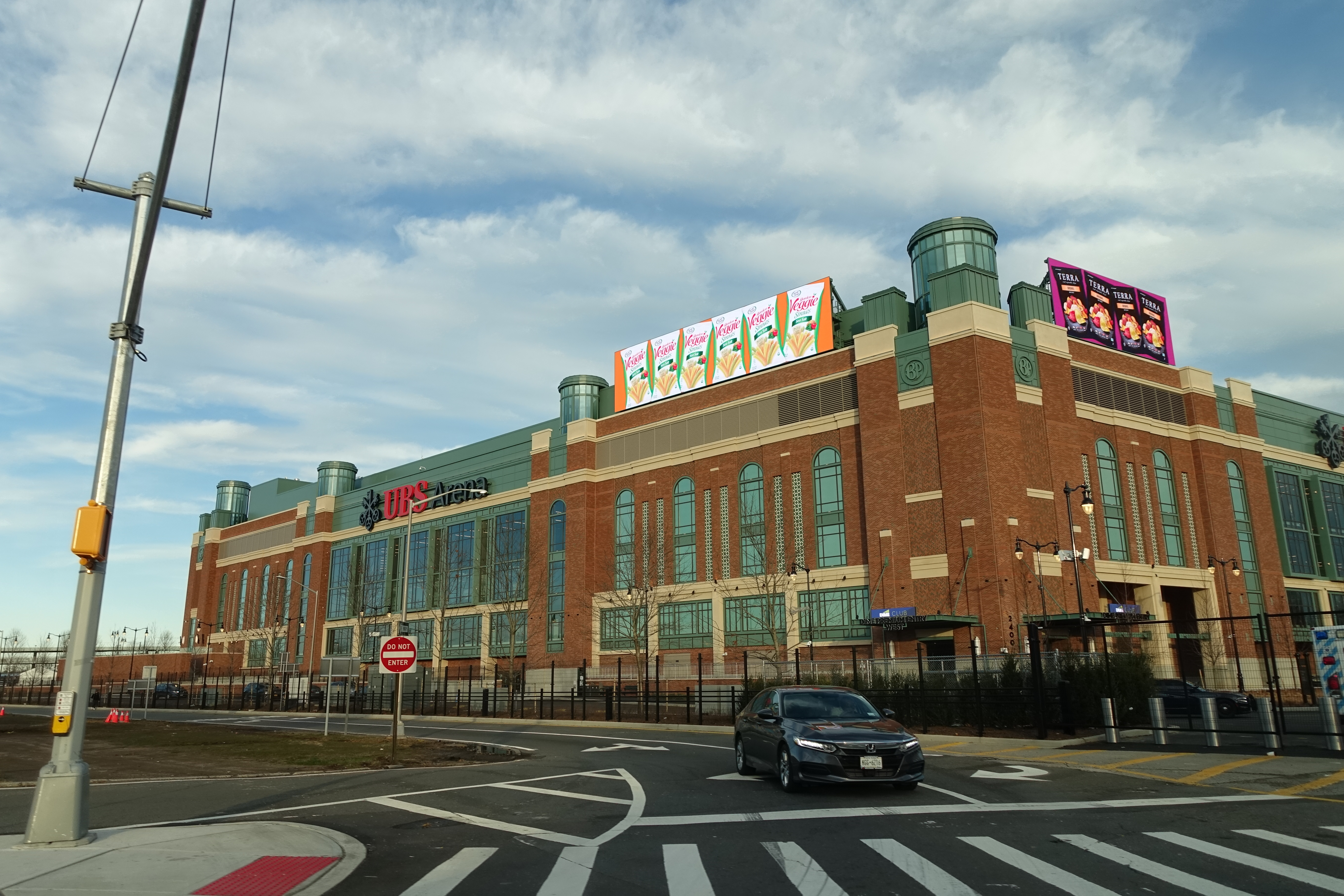
UBS Arena

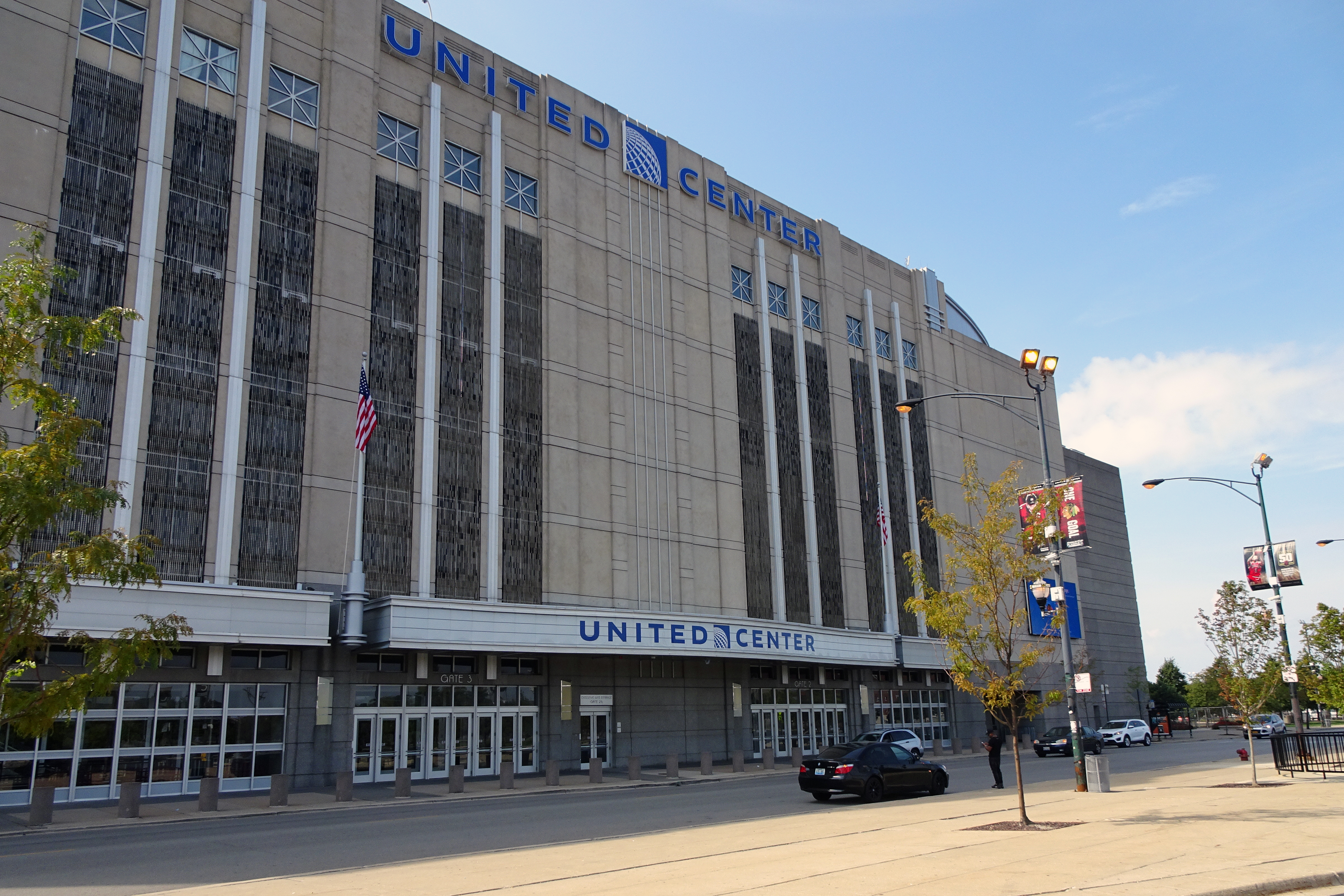
United Center

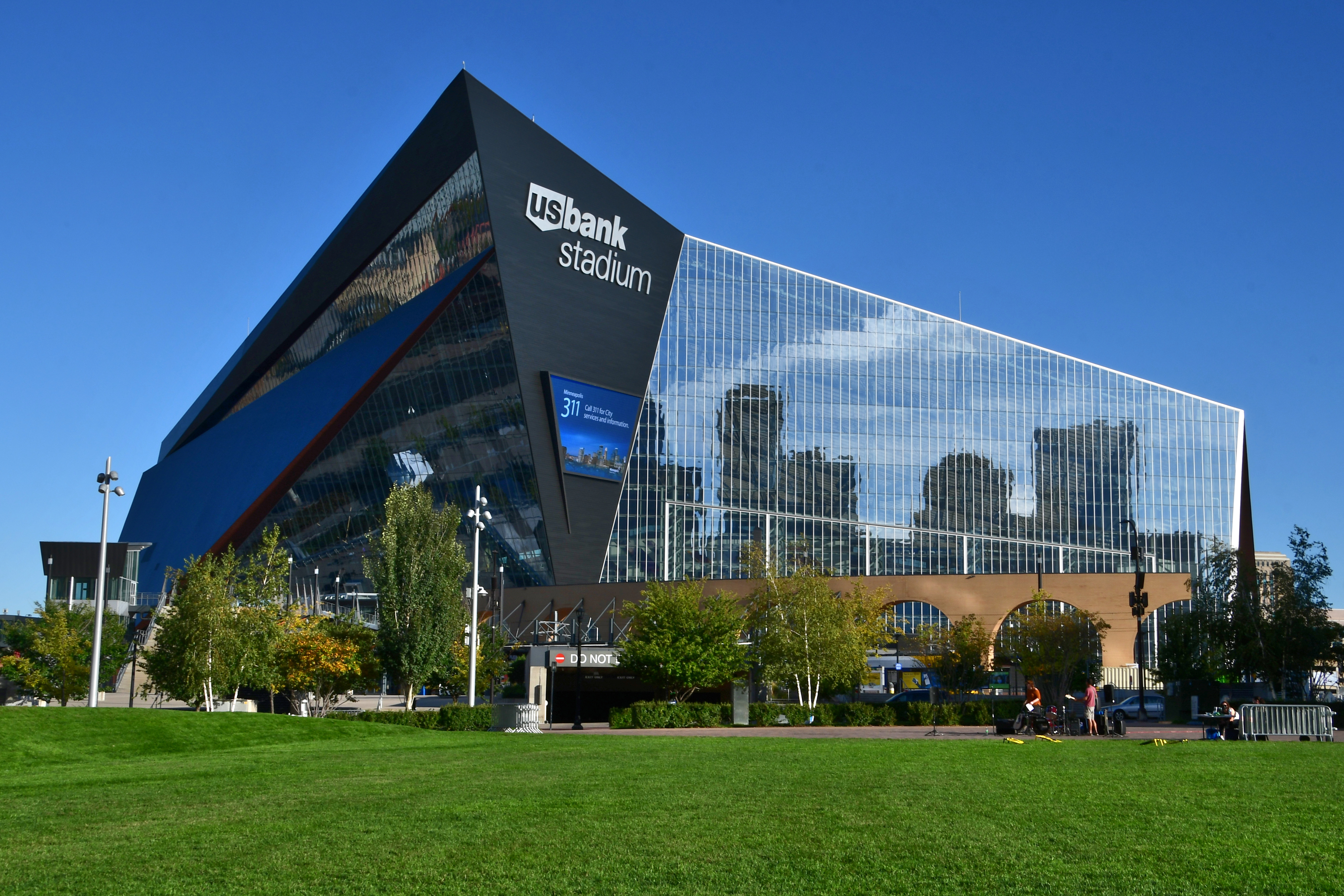
U.S. Bank Stadium

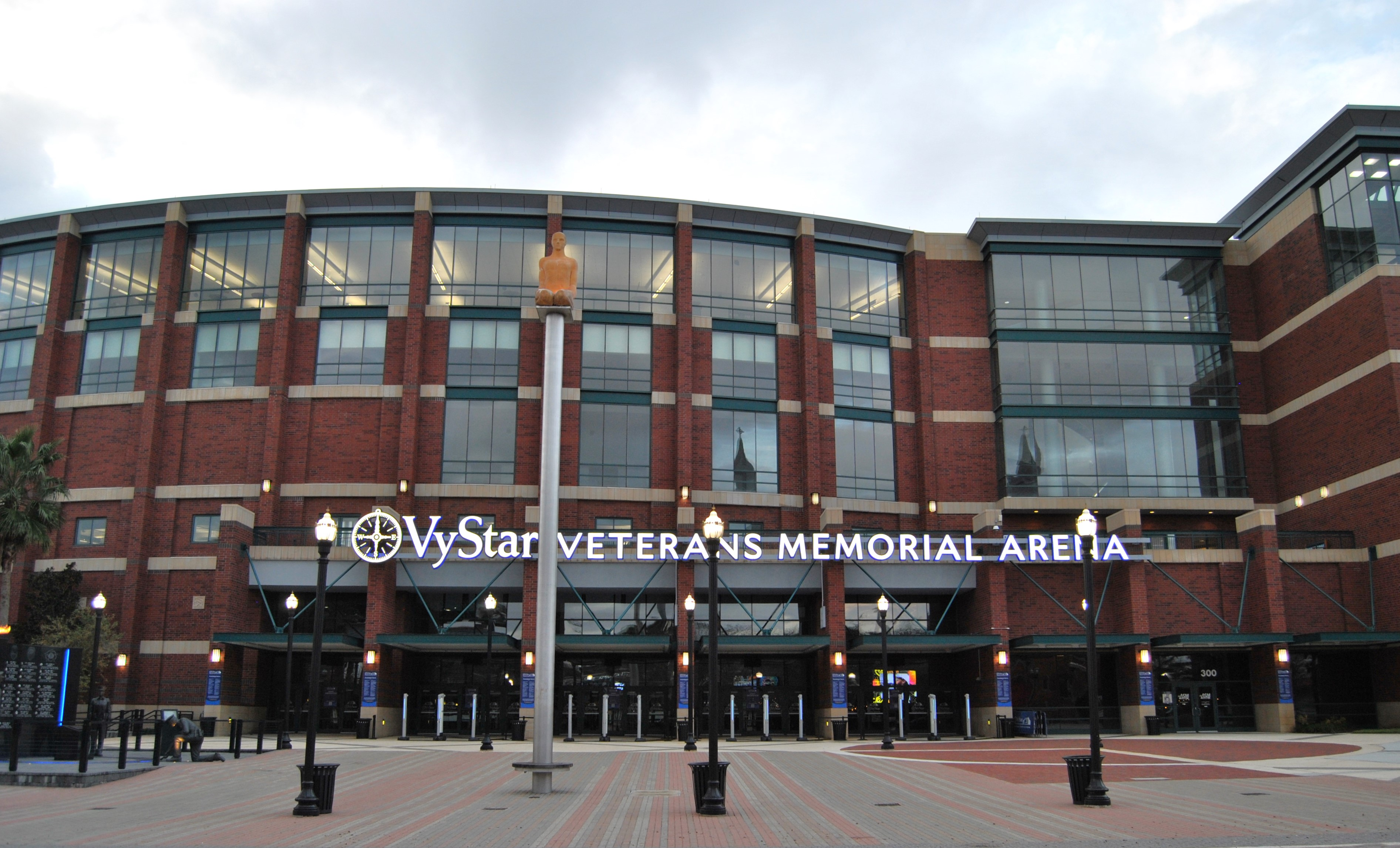
VyStar Veterans Memorial Arena

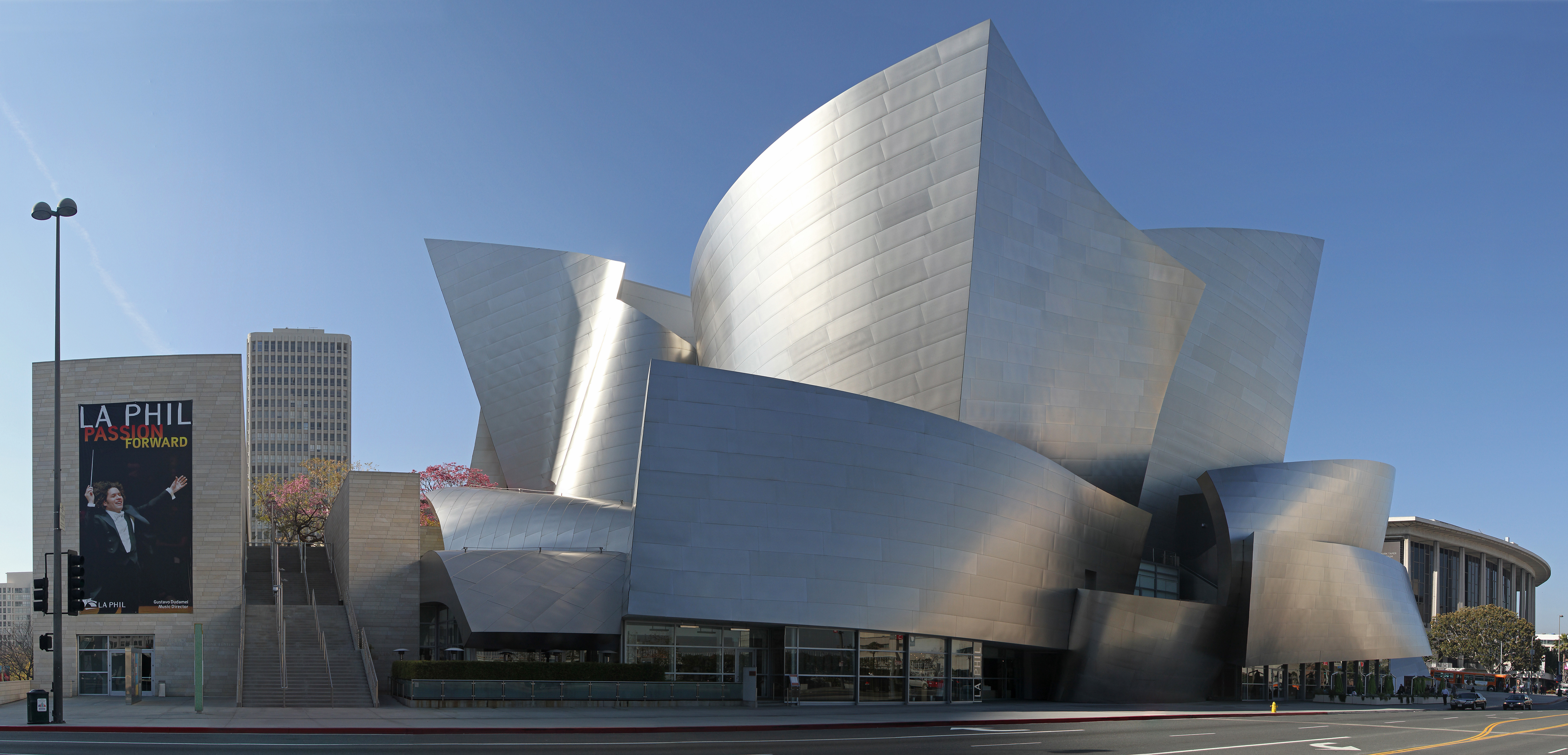
Walt Disney Concert Hall

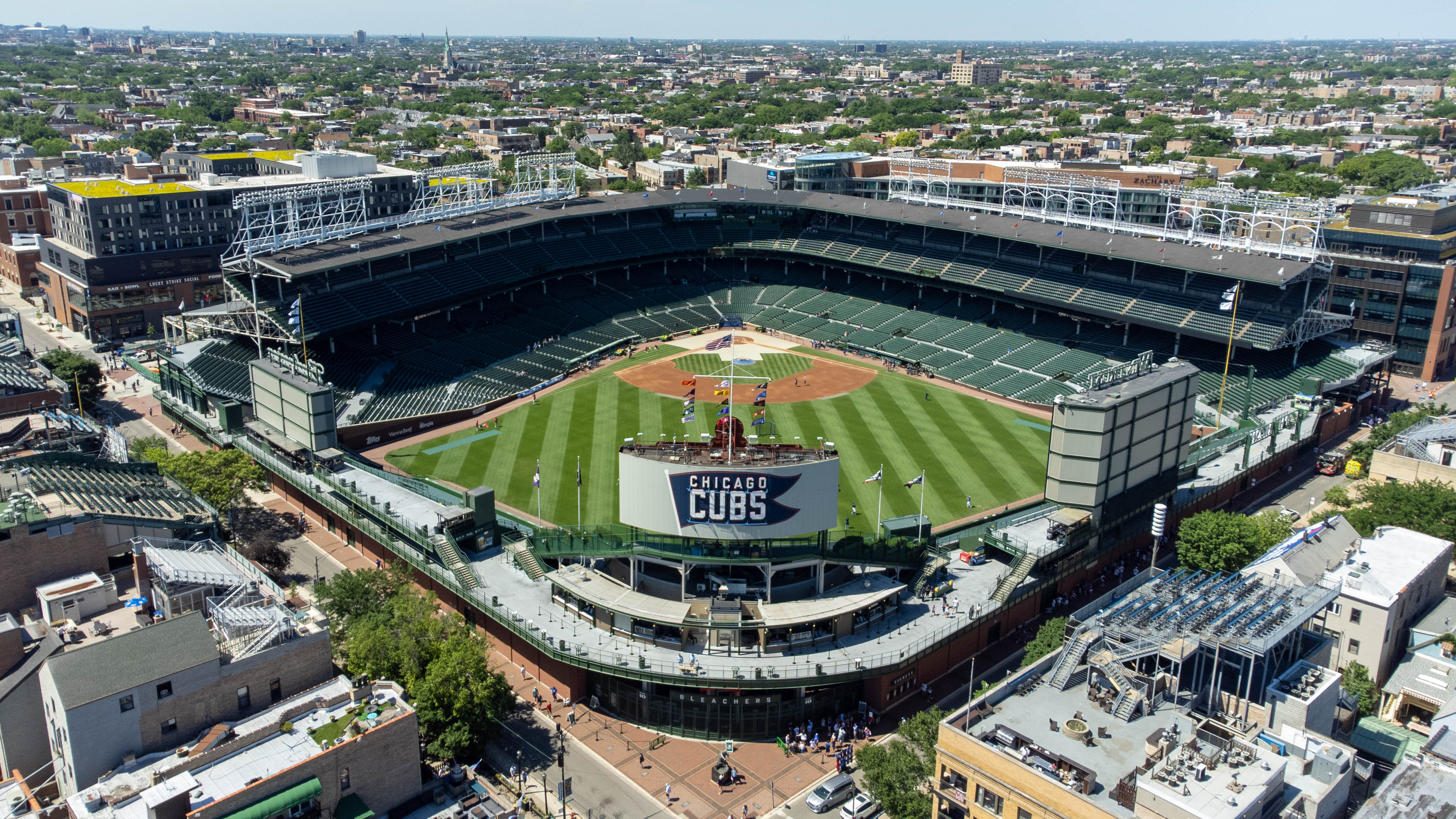
Wrigley Field

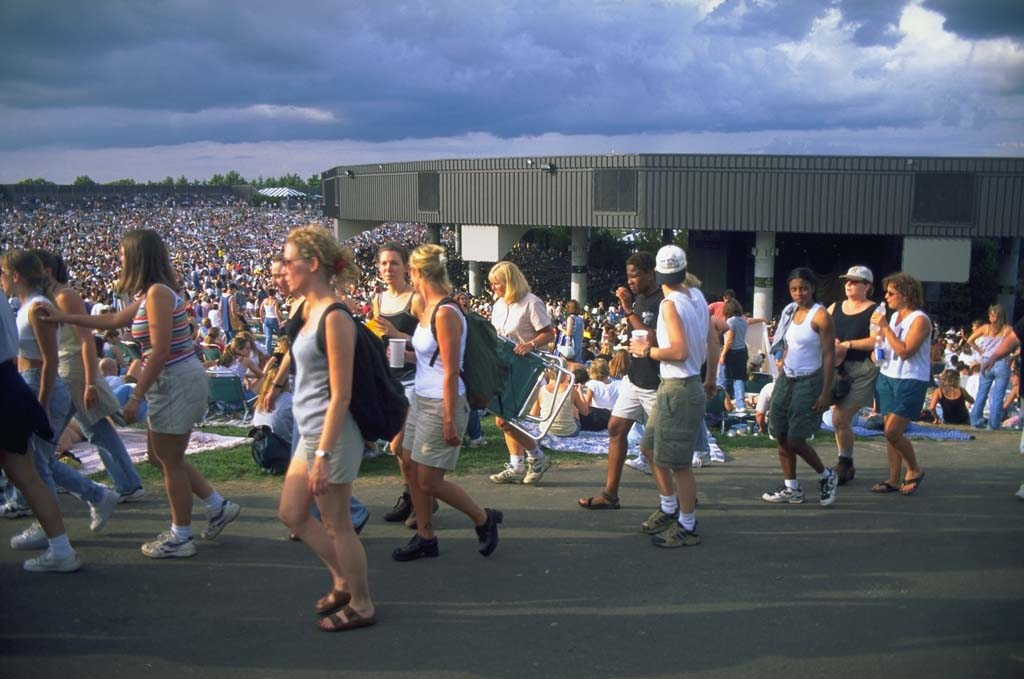
Xfinity Center

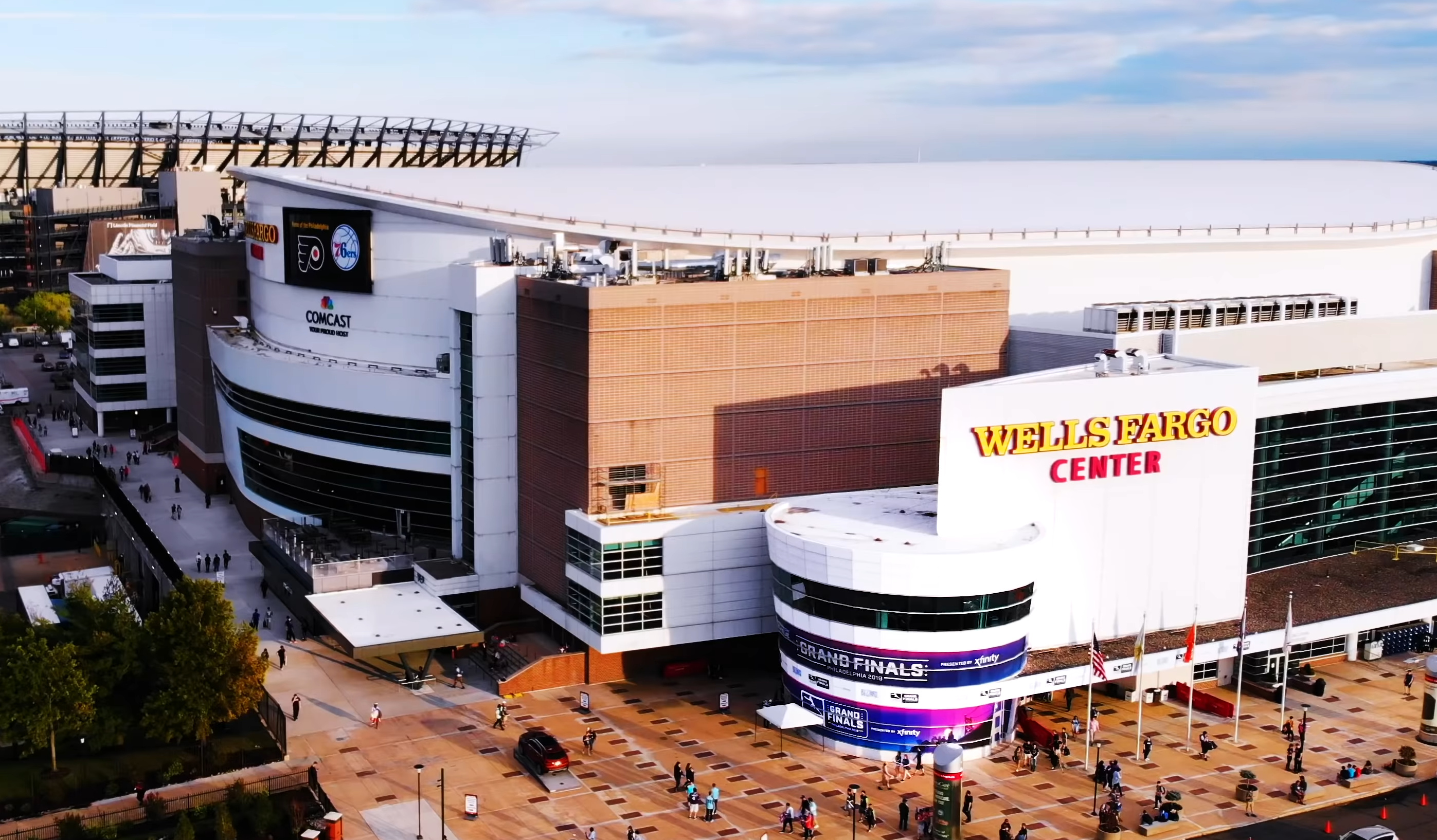
Xfinity Mobile Arena

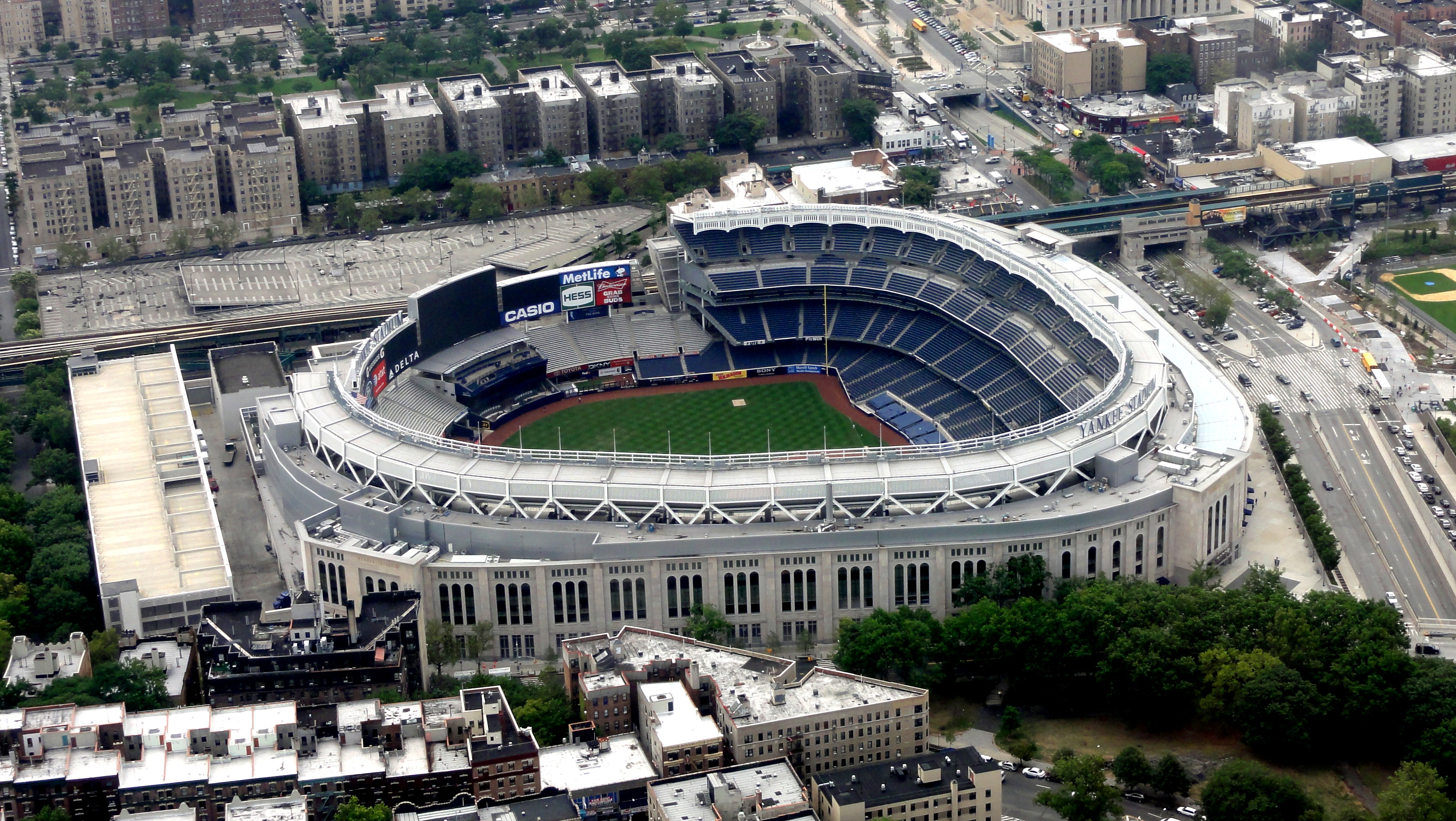
Yankee Stadium

== See also ==
- List of outdoor music venues in the United States
