= List of outdoor music venues in the United States =

This is a list of outdoor music venues in the United States. Venues with a capacity of 1,000 or higher are included.

== List ==
Opened	Venue	City	Capacity
Alabama
2022	Sand Mountain Amphitheatre	Albertville	5,000
2025	Coca-Cola Amphitheater	Birmingham	9,300
2020	Big Creek Amphitheater	Dothan	6,000
2000	AllIn Amphitheater	Dothan	12,400
2023	Venue at Coosa Landing	Gadsden	1,092
1935	Mort Glosser Amphitheater	Gadsden	1,600
May 2022	Orion Amphitheatre	Huntsville	8,000
1995	Riverwalk Amphitheater	Montgomery	6,000
2006	The Wharf Amphitheater	Orange Beach	10,000
2011	Phenix City Amphitheatre	Phenix City	3,000
April 2, 2011	Mercedes-Benz Amphitheater	Tuscaloosa	8,410
Arizona
2006	Pepsi Amphitheatre	Flagstaff	3,000
Spring 2025	VAI Resort Amphitheater	Glendale	11,000
November 11, 1990	Talking Stick Resort Amphitheatre	Phoenix	20,106
2001	Anselmo Valencia Amphitheatre	Tucson	4,400
Arkansas
2013	First Security Amphitheatre	Little Rock	8,375
2014	Walmart Arkansas Music Pavilion	Rogers	9,500
2000	Timberwood Amphitheatre	Hot Springs	5,000
California
2007	Spectrum Amphitheatre	Bakersfield	4,000
1951	Starlight Bowl	Burbank	3,800
Spring 2021	Cathedral City Community Amphitheater	Cathedral City	4,500
July 21, 1998	North Island Credit Union Amphitheatre	Chula Vista	20,500
May 1975	Toyota Pavilion at Concord	Concord	12,500
July 29, 1983	Pacific Amphitheatre	Costa Mesa	8,042
1984	Rotary Amphitheater	Fresno	4,000
1923	Ramona Bowl	Hemet	5,400
1931	John Anson Ford Amphitheatre	Hollywood	1,200
August 2024	Great Park Live	Irvine	7,500
July 11, 1922	Hollywood Bowl	Los Angeles	17,376
2024	Chicken Ranch Casino Amphitheatre	Modesto	3,500
1986	Shoreline Amphitheatre	Mountain View	22,500
2013	Vina Robles Amphitheatre	Paso Robles	3,000
1982	Glen Helen Amphitheater	San Bernardino	65,000
1936	Starlight Bowl	San Diego	4,300
May 3, 1941	CalCoast Credit Union Open Air Theatre	San Diego	4,280
August 29, 2019	The Rady Shell at Jacobs Park	San Diego	10,000
1971	Marin County Civic Center	San Rafael	6,000
October 2024	Adventist Health Amphitheatre	Tulare	6,000
June 10, 2000	Toyota Amphitheatre	Wheatland	18,500
Colorado
May 2024	Ford Amphitheater	Colorado Springs	8,000
2017	Levitt Pavilion	Denver	20,000 (Free shows); 7,500 (paid shows)
1982	Fiddler's Green Amphitheatre	Greenwood Village	18,000
1990	Gerald R. Ford Amphitheater	Vail	2,600
2004	Las Colonias Park Amphitheatre	Grand Junction	4,000
1928	Red Rocks Amphitheater	Morrison	9,525
Connecticut
1998	Hartford Healthcare Amphitheatre	Bridgeport	5,700
1995	Xfinity Theatre	Hartford	24,100
1990	Gampel Pavilion	Storrs	10,842
Delaware
2021	Freeman Arts Pavilion	Selbyville	4,000
Florida
2016	Apopka Amphitheatre	Apopka	6,300
1936	Daytona Beach Bandshell	Daytona Beach	4,500
May 2022	Caloosa Sound Amphitheater	Fort Myers	3,000
May 2017	Daily's Place	Jacksonville	5,500
1984	Metropolitan Park	Jacksonville	10,000
June 2, 1965; rebuilt 2007	St. Augustine Amphitheatre	St. Augustine	5,000
2021	Coffee Butler Amphitheatre	Key West	4,000
February 21, 2009	Universal Music Plaza Stage	Orlando	8,000
2016	Orlando Amphitheatre	Orlando	10,000
2024	Orlando Pavilion	Orlando	5,000
January 11, 1991	Mizner Park Amphitheater	Boca Raton	5,000 (GA); 3,500(Reserved)
2009	Sunset Cove Amphitheater	Boca Raton	6,000
unknown	Bassant Park	Panama City Beach	7,500
May 2012	Hunter Amphitheater	Pensacola	5,000
1992	Pompano Beach Amphitheater	Pompano Beach	3,000 (2,894 fixed seats)
1984	Jannus Live	St. Petersburg	2,000
July 25, 2004	MidFlorida Credit Union Amphitheatre	Tampa	20,000
2021	Adderley Amphitheatre	Tallahassee	3,420
April 26, 1996	ITHINK Financial Amphitheatre	West Palm Beach	20,000
1985	Klipsch Amphitheatre	Miami	10,000
Georgia
1980s	Veterans Park Amphitheatre	Albany	2,500
July 1989	Cellairis Amphitheatre	Atlanta	18,920
June 20, 1944	Synovus Bank Amphitheater	Atlanta	6,900
May 10, 2008	Ameris Bank Amphitheatre	Alpharetta	12,000
2007	Northwest Georgia Amphitheatre	Ringgold	3,500
2018	Northside Hospital-Cherokee Amphitheater	Woodstock	5,000
Hawaii
1956	Waikiki Shell	Honolulu	8,400
1994	Maui Arts and Cultural Center	Kahului	5,500 (Alexander and Baldwin Amphitheatre); 4,000 (Community Events Lawn); 1,500 (Yokouchi Pavilion)
Idaho
July 1997	Ford Idaho Center	Nampa	10,500
July 2017	Snake River Landing Waterfront	Idaho Falls	3,520
2015	Portneuf Amphitheatre	Pocatello	9,000
Illinois
August 15, 1904	Ravinia Pavilion	Highland Park	3,350
July 16, 2004	Jay Pritzker Pavilion	Chicago	11,000
June 24, 2005	Huntington Bank Pavilion	Chicago	30,000
1950	Sinnissippi Music Shell	Rockford	3,700
May 29, 2019	Devon Lakeside Amphitheatre	Decatur	3,000
1990	Credit Union 1 Amphitheatre	Tinley Park	28,000
Indiana
May 2021	Everwise Amphitheater at White River State Park	Indianapolis	6,000
2025	Nickel Plate District Amphitheater	Fishers	unknown
unknown	Caesars Amphitheatre	New Albany	6,000
1989	Ruoff Music Center	Noblesville	24,790
Iowa
2014	McGrath Amphitheatre	Cedar Rapids	6,000
July 3, 1988	Westfair Amphitheater	Council Bluffs	12,000
2014	Lauridsen Amphitheater	Des Moines	25,000
2014	Killinger Family Stage	Des Moines	2,000
unknown	Alliant Energy Amphitheater	Dubuque	4,200
Kansas
April 28, 2018	Capital Federal Amphitheater	Andover	10,000
1983	Azura Amphitheater	Bonner Springs	18,000
Kentucky
May 1974	Wilson Fine Arts Center Amphitheater	Bowling Green	2,900
2023	Megacorp Pavilion	Newport	6,000
1888	Iroquois Amphitheatre	Louisville	2,348
Louisiana
August 21, 2010	Champions Square	New Orleans	7,000
Spring 2022	First Horizon Amphitheater	Lafayette	3,000
Maine
July 28, 2010	Darling's Waterfront Pavilion	Bangor	15,000
Maryland
1981	Pier 6 Pavilion	Baltimore	4,400
1967	Merriweather Post Pavilion	Columbia	19,319
Massachusetts
1950	Cape Cod Melody Tent	Barnstable	2,300
1994	Leader Bank Pavilion	Boston	5,200
June 13, 1986	Xfinity Center	Mansfield	19,900
Michigan
Unknown	Aretha Franklin Amphitheater	Detroit	6,000
June 25, 1972	Pine Knob Music Theatre	Clarkston	15,274
1966	Meadow Brook Amphitheatre	Rochester Hills	7,700
2000	Michigan Lottery Amphitheatre at Freedom Hill	Sterling Heights	7,200
1988	Clio Amphitheatre	Clio	3,000
2005	Kern Community Pavilion	Frankenmuth	3,300
unknown	Adado Riverside Park	Lansing	15,000
May 2005	Soaring Eagle Outdoor Arena	Mt. Pleasant	11,000 (General Admission); 5,089 (Reserved)
Minnesota
1992	Grand Casino Amphitheater	Hinckley	65,000
2010	Vetter Stone Amphitheatre	Mankato	12,000
2009	Bluestem Amphitheater	Moorhead	3,000
2025	Mystic Lake Amphitheater	Shakopee	19,000
2017	Treasure Island Amphitheater	Welch	16,000
Mississippi
2018	Brandon Amphitheater	Brandon	8,300
2006	BankPlus Amphitheatre	Southaven	9,800
Missouri
June 14, 1991	Hollywood Casino Amphitheatre	Maryland Heights	20,000
2021	Grandview Amphitheatre	Grandview	5,000
1960; remodeled 2021	Capital Region MU Healthcare Amphitheatre	Jefferson City	2,500
Montana
July 13, 2017	KettleHouse Amphitheater	Bonner	4,000
Nevada
2015	Amphitheater at Craig Ranch	North Las Vegas	6,800
1944	Lake Tahoe Outdoor Arena	Stateline	7,500
New Hampshire
August 16, 1996	Bank of New Hampshire Pavilion	Gilford	9,300
New Jersey
1995	Freedom Mortgage Pavilion	Camden	25,000
1968	PNC Bank Arts Center	Holmdel	17,500
New Mexico
February 2000	Isleta Amphitheater	Albuquerque	15,000
2002	Sandia Amphitheatre	Albuquerque	4,000
New York
July 4, 2006	Bethel Woods Center for the Arts	Bethel	16,000
June 25, 2016	Ford Amphitheater at Coney Island	Brooklyn	5,000
May 1981	Darien Lake Performing Arts Center	Darien	21,600
1974	Earl W. Brydges Artpark State Park	Lewiston	10,000 (Amphitheater); 4,400 (Mainstage Amphitheater); 2,400(Mainstage Theater)
1987	Catholic Health Amphitheater at Bald Hill	Farmingdale	7,000
1874; rebuilt 2017	Chautauqua Amphitheatre	Jamestown	4,400
1983	Marvin Sands Performing Arts Center	Hopewell	15,000
July 9, 1966	Saratoga Performing Arts Center	Saratoga Springs	25,100
September 3, 2015	Empower Federal Credit Union Amphitheater	Syracuse	17,500
1952	Jones Beach Theater	Wantagh	15,000
North Carolina
July 4, 1991	Truliant Amphitheater	Charlotte	19,500
June 2009	Skyla Credit Union Amphitheatre	Charlotte	5,000
September 1, 2023	The Amp Ballantyne	Charlotte	3,500
June 5, 2011	White Oak Amphitheatre	Greensboro	7,061
July 4, 1991	Coastal Credit Union Music Park	Raleigh	20,601
June 4, 2010	Red Hat Amphitheater	Raleigh	5,990
July 4, 2021	Live Oak Bank Pavilion	Wilmington	7,200
unknown	Greenfield Lake Amphitheater	Wilmington	1,200
Ohio
July 4, 1984	Riverbend Music Center	Cincinnati	20,500
May 24, 2008	PNC Pavilion	Cincinnati	4,100
1982	Timberwolf Amphitheatre	Cincinnati	10,000
1987	Jacobs Pavilion	Cleveland	5,000
1981	Blossom Music Center	Cuyahoga Falls	23,000
1991	Fraze Pavilion	Kettering	4,300
May 2023	Pangle Pavilion at Greater Lima Park and Amphitheatre	Lima	3,600
December 18, 2013	MGM Northfield Park	Northfield	1,900
1936	Toledo Zoo Amphitheater	Toledo	4,500
June 14, 2019	Youngstown Foundation Amphitheatre	Youngstown	4,800
Oklahoma
1936	Zoo Amphitheatre	Oklahoma City	8,500
Oregon
2002	Hayden Homes Amphitheater	Bend	8,000
Unknown	Cuthbert Amphitheatre	Eugene	5,000
Unknown	Swanson Amphitheatre	Roseburg	5,000
1911	Mcmenamins Edgewood Lawn	Troutdale	7,000
unknown	L.B. Day Amphitheatre	Salem	8,900
Pennsylvania
1935	Mann Center	Philadelphia	14,000
2012	Highmark Skyline Stage	Philadelphia	7,500
2011	Peoples' Natural Gas Park	Johnstown	4,000 (including lawn area)
December 2010	Stage AE	Pittsburgh	5,500 (Amphitheater); 2,400 (Music Hall)
June 24, 2000	The Pavilion	Scranton	16,000
unknown	Poconos Park Amphitheater	Bushkill	10,000
May 18, 1939	Star Pavilion	Hershey	8,000
unknown	Highmark Amphitheatre	Erie	5,000
June 17, 1990	The Pavilion at Star Lake	Burgettstown	23,000
South Carolina
1999	Floyd Amphitheater	Anderson	12,000
unknown	Amphitheatre at the Point	North Charleston	15,000
2005	CCNB Amphitheatre	Simpsonville	15,000
South Dakota
1981	Buffalo Chip Campground	Sturgis	100,000
Tennessee
unknown	Wilma Rudolph Amphitheater	Clarksville	5,000
unknown	Mud Island Amphitheater	Memphis	5,000
July 30, 2015	Ascend Amphitheater	Nashville	6,800
2012	Carl Black Chevy Woods Amphitheatre	Nashville	4,500
2021	FirstBank Amphitheater	Franklin	7,500
1982	Tennessee Amphitheater	Knoxville	7,500
unknown	Chilhowee Park Amphitheater	Knoxville	4,500
1971	Melton Lake Park	Oak Ridge	4,000 (North Side Pavilion); 1,500 (South Side Pavilion)
Texas
unknown	Lime Rock Amphitheater	Tuscola	5,000
unknown	Starlight Ranch	Amarillo	2,500
November 17, 2012	Germania Insurance Amphitheater	Austin	14,000
2021	Moody Amphitheater	Austin	5,000
2003	Doggett Ford Park	Beaumont	9,000(Arena); 2,300(Doggett Ford Theater); 14,300 (Amphitheater)
Unknown	Wolf Pen Creek Amphitheater	College Station	7,000
2001	Concrete Street Amphitheater	Corpus Christi	10,000
1988	Dos Equis Pavilion	Dallas	20,000
2016	The Horseshoe Amphitheater	Midland	4,300
2001; remodeled 2019	Real Life Amphitheater	Selma	20,000
April 1990	Cynthia Woods Mitchell Pavilion	The Woodlands	16,500
Utah
2003	USANA Amphitheatre	West Valley City	20,000
unknown	Ogden Amphitheater	Ogden	7,573
unknown	Deseret Peak Complex	Tooele	4,816 (Indoor arena); 4,500(Outdoor Arena)
Virginia
unknown (Renovated 2024-26)	Riverfront Park Amphitheater	Lynchburg	3,500 (Reserved); 5,000 (General Admission)
2001	Union Bank & Trust Pavilion	Portsmouth	6,500
June 1995	Jiffy Lube Live	Bristow	25,262
2025	Allianz Amphitheater	Richmond	7,500
2014	Elmwood Park Amphitheater	Roanoke	4,000
1996	Veterans United Home Loans Amphitheater	Virginia Beach	20,000
1957; restored 2025	The Dome	Virginia Beach	2,407 (Reserved); 3,500 (General Admission); 5,000 (Amphitheater)
Washington
1986	The Gorge Amphitheatre	George	27,500
June 14, 2003	White River Amphitheatre	Auburn	16,000
2003	RV Inn Style Resorts Amphitheater	Ridgefield	18,000
1974	Spokane Pavilion	Spokane	5,000
West Virginia
2009	Clarksburg Amphitheatre	Clarksburg	2,000
unknown	Ruby Amphitheatre	Morgantown	1,500
May 20, 2006	Mountain Lakes Amphitheater	Flatwoods	1,700
Wisconsin
1987	American Family Insurance Amphitheater	Milwaukee	23,000
1977	Alpine Valley Music Theater	East Troy	37,000
2020	Riverside Park	La Crosse	250 fixed seating 2000+ lawn seating
May 26, 2005	Leach Amphitheater	Oshkosh	7,500
1981; expanded 2011	Somerset Amphitheater	Somerset	40,000 (Amphitheater); 10,000(The Grove)
unknown	Marathon Park Amphitheater	Wausau	8,220
Wyoming
1991	Cheyenne Frontier Days Arena	Cheyenne	19,000
Guam
Unknown	Governor Joseph F. Flores Memorial Park	Tamuning	15,000
Puerto Rico
	Anfiteatro Tito Puente	San Juan	3,000
Washington, D.C.
1950	Carter Barron Amphitheatre	Washington, D.C.	4,200
1917	National Sylvan Theater	Washington, D.C.	10,000

== Gallery ==
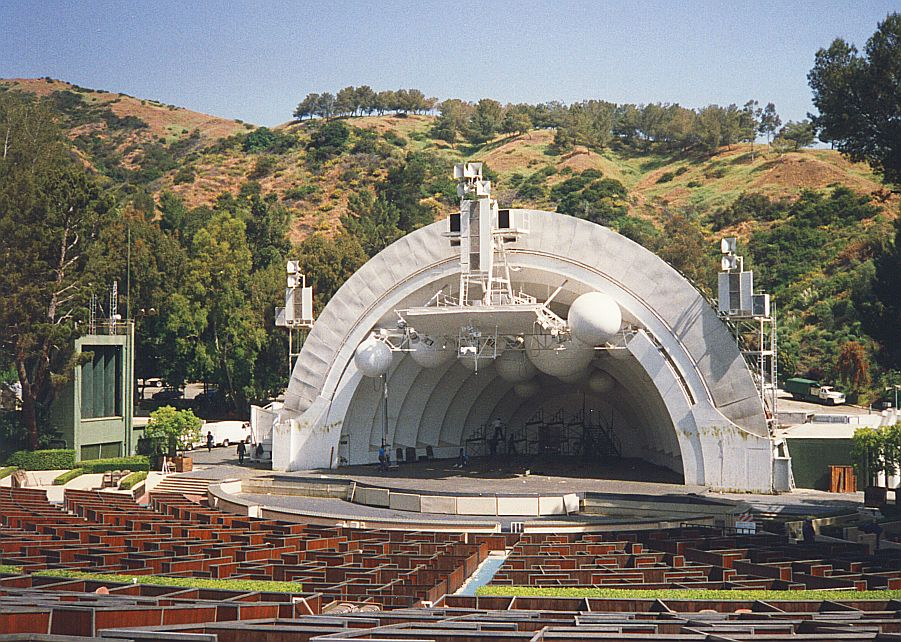
Hollywood Bowl

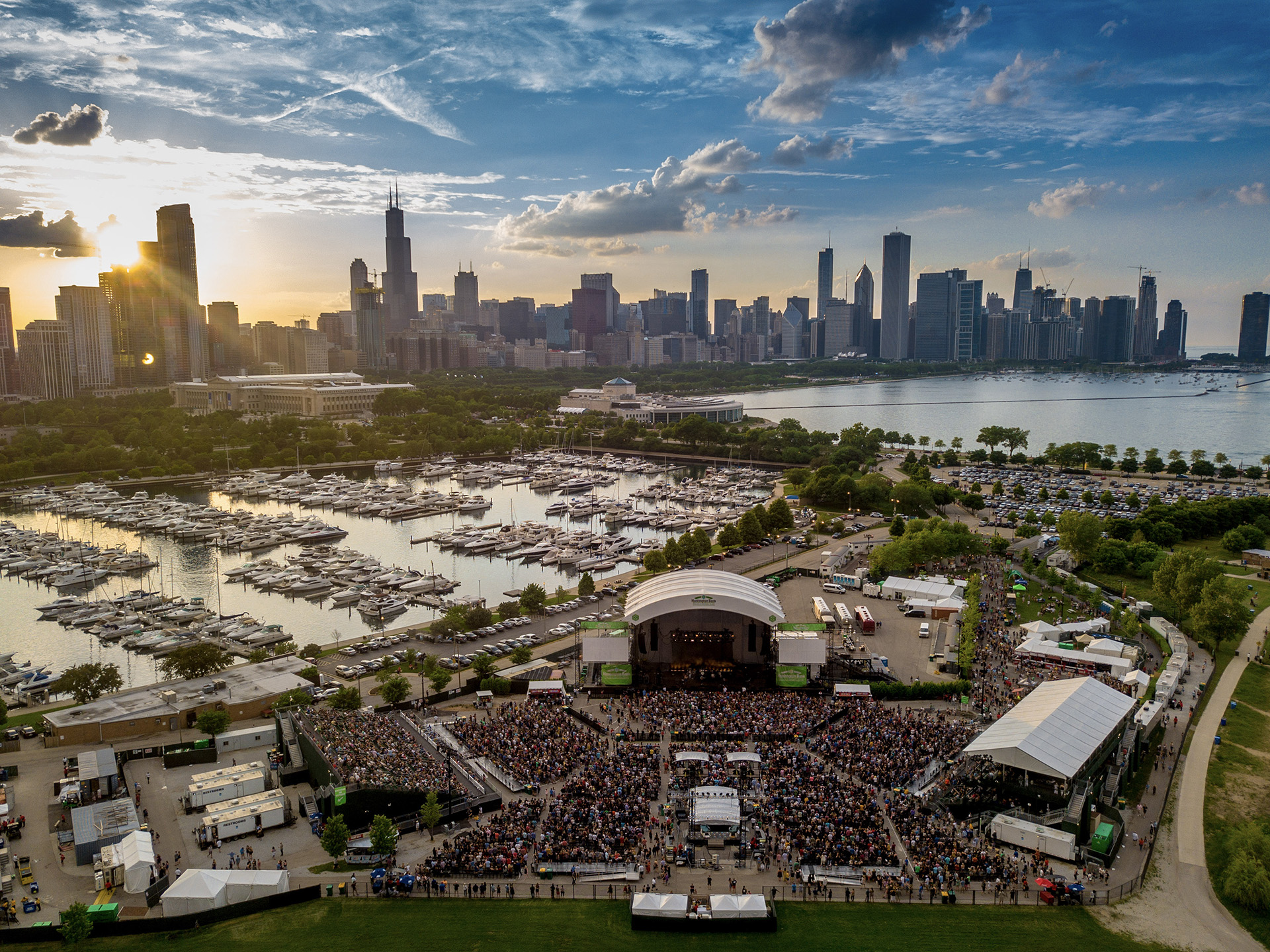
Huntington Bank Pavilion

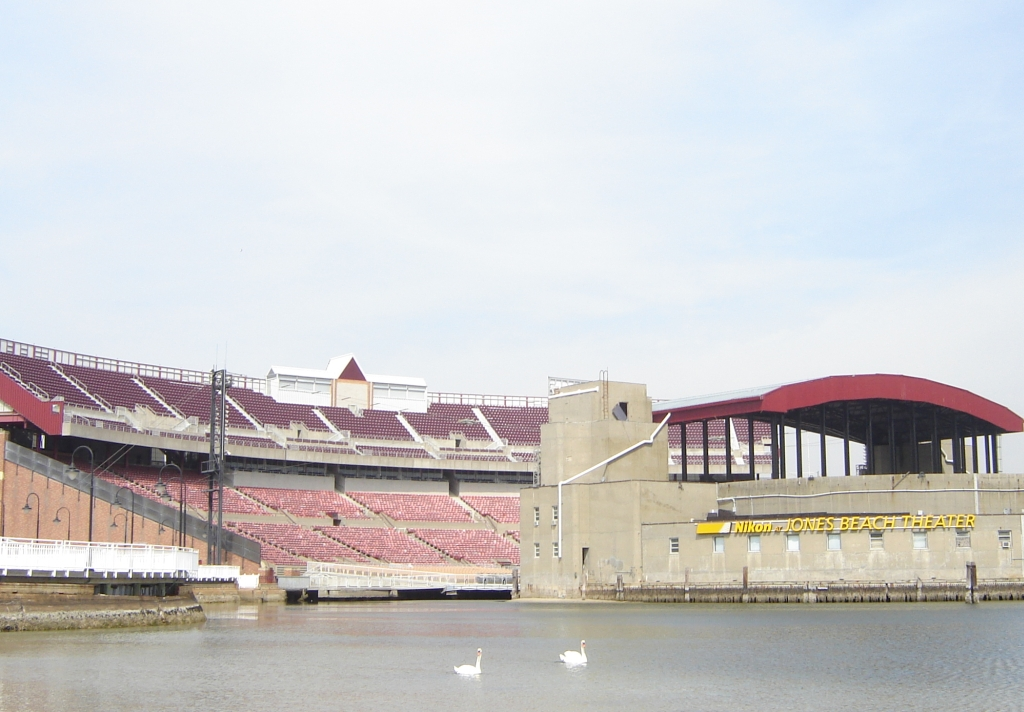
Jones Beach Theater

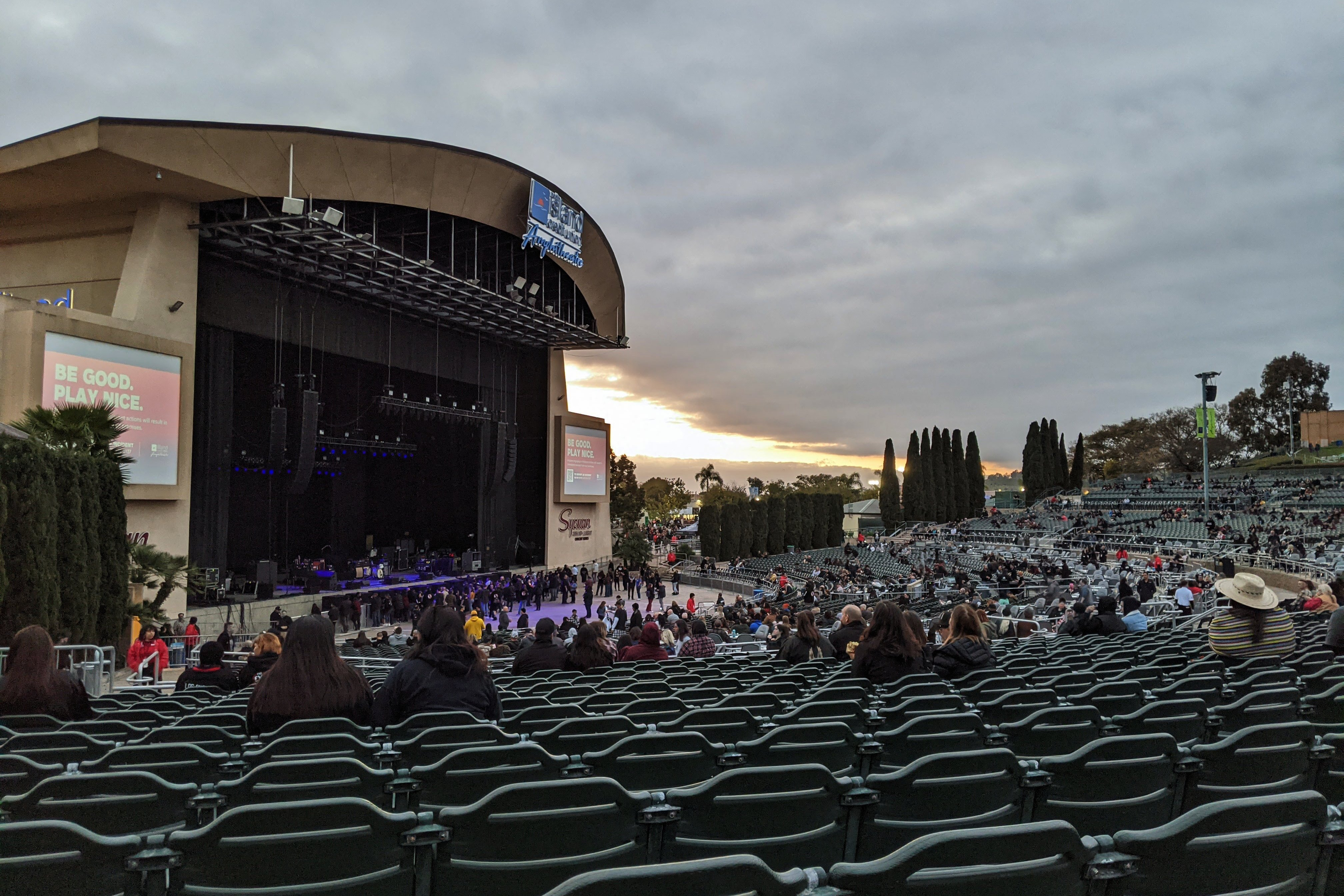
North Island Credit Union Amphitheatre

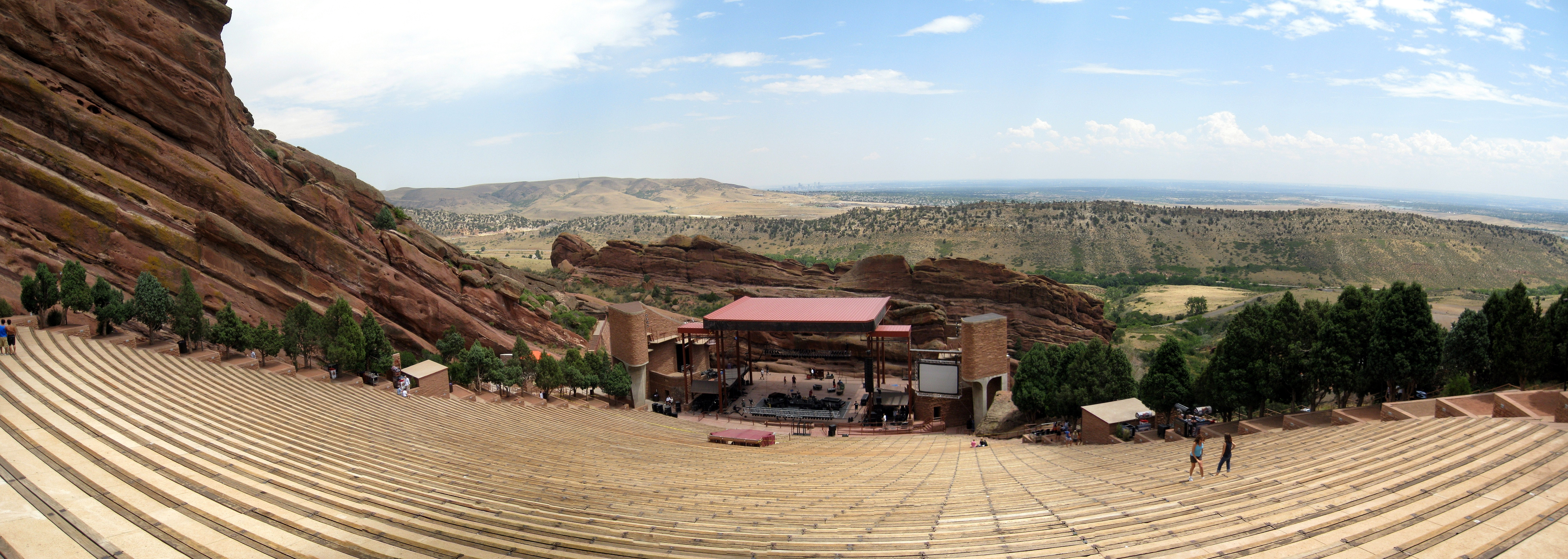
Red Rocks Amphitheatre

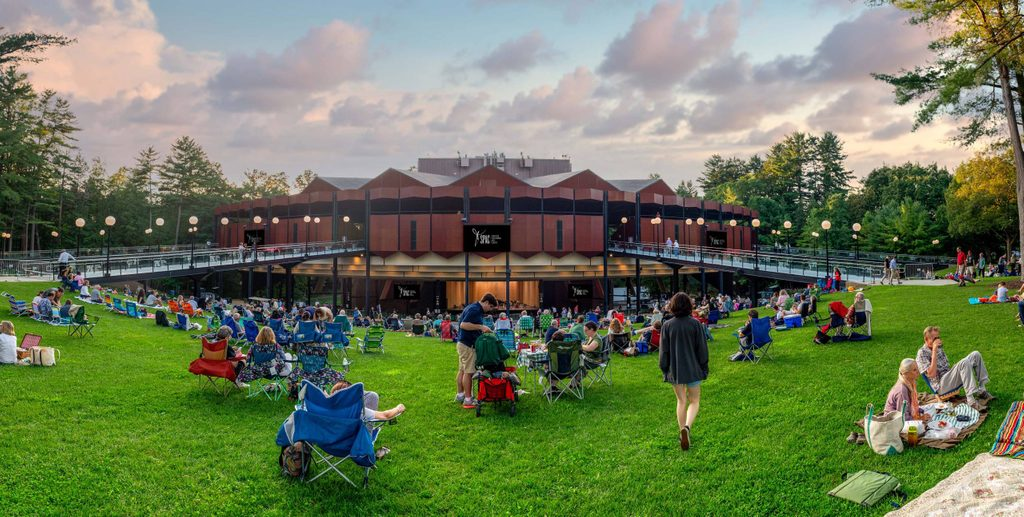
Saratoga Performing Arts Center

== See also ==
- List of music venues in the United States
- List of contemporary amphitheatres
