= List of contemporary amphitheatres =

This is a list of outdoor amphitheatres in use today with a capacity of at least 1,000.

== Amphitheatres by capacity ==
Country	Province, state, etc.	City	Name	Stage type	Capacity	Image
Argentina	Santa Fe	Rosario	Humberto de Nito Municipal Amphitheater	Not covered	3,000	Humberto de Nito Municipal Amphitheater
Australia	Australian Capital Territory	Canberra	Stage 88, Commonwealth Park	Covered stage and lawn	10,000	Stage 88 in Commonwealth Park
Australia	Queensland	Brisbane	Riverstage	Roof only	9,500	
Australia	Queensland	Brisbane	Roma Street Parkland Amphitheatre	Roof only	2,000	
Australia	Victoria	Melbourne	Sidney Myer Music Bowl	Tent	12,030	Sidney Myer Music Bowl in May 2005
Australia	Western Australia	Perth	Belvoir Amphitheatre		4,500	
Austria	Vorarlberg	Bregenz	Seebühne	Not covered (floating)	11,735	
Bahrain	Southern Governorate	Zallaq	Al Dana Amphitheatre		10,000	
Belarus	Vitebsk Region	Vitebsk	Summer Amphitheatre	Roof only	6,219	
Belarus	Minsk Region	Maladzyechna	Maladzyechna Amphitheatre	Roof only	2,600	
Brunei	Jerudong	Bandar Seri Begawan	Jerudong Park Amphitheater	Roof only	60,000	
Canada	Alberta	Banff	Shaw Amphitheatre at the Banff Centre	Roof only	1,600	
Canada	Alberta	Edmonton	Heritage Amphitheatre in Hawrelak Park		4,033	
Canada	British Columbia	Vancouver	PNE Amphitheatre at the Pacific National Exhibition		4,500	
Canada	Ontario	Sudbury	Grace Hartman Amphitheatre	Square enclosure	1,950	
Canada	Ontario	Thunder Bay	Fort William Historical Park Amphitheatre		50,000	
Canada	Ontario	Toronto	RBC Amphitheatre	Square enclosure	16,000	
Canada	Ontario	Vaughan	Kingswood Music Theatre at Canada's Wonderland		15,000	
Canada	Quebec	Joliette	Amphithéâtre Fernand-Lindsay	Roof	7,000	
Canada	Quebec	Montreal	Théâtre de Verdure	Not covered	2,500	
Canada	Quebec	Trois-Rivières	Amphithéâtre Cogeco	Roof	9,000	
Chile	Valparaíso Region	Viña del Mar	Anfiteatro de la Quinta Vergara	Square enclosure	20,000	
Colombia	Bogotá	Bogotá	La Media Torta	Not covered	7,000	
Dominican Republic	Dominican Republic	La Romana	Altos de Chavón Amphitheater	Not covered	5,000	
Germany	Berlin-Brandenburg Metropolitan Region	Berlin	Kindl-Bühne Wuhlheide	Tent	17,000	
Germany	Berlin-Brandenburg Metropolitan Region	Berlin	Waldbühne	Tent	22,290	Waldbühne during a performance by Barbra Streisand, summer 2007
Germany	Mecklenburg-Vorpommern	Ralswiek	Open Air Theatre	Not covered	8,800	
Germany	Saxony	Dresden	Freilichtbühne Großer Garten	Tent	4,900	
Greece	Argolis	Epidaurus	Ancient Theatre of Epidaurus	Greek theatre	14,000	The 4th-century BC Ancient Theatre of Epidaurus still functions today as an open-air amphitheatre for ancient Greek tragedy and comedy performances as well as for modern theatrical performances.
Greece	Attica	Athens	Lycabettus Theatre	Not covered	3,000	
Greece	Attica	Athens	Odeon of Herodes Atticus	Not covered	5,000	
Greece	Attica	Athens	Katrakio Theatre	Not covered	5,000	
Greece	Attica	Athens	Petra Theatre	Not covered	4,000	
Greece	Attica	Athens	Theater of the Rocks "Melina Merkouri"	Not covered	2,800	
Greece	Attica	Piraeus	Veakio Theatre	Not covered	2,000	
Israel	Central District	Ra'anana	Ra'anana Amphipark	Not covered	8,300	
Mexico	Nuevo León	Monterrey	Auditorio Banamex		8,000	
New Zealand	Hastings	Hawke's Bay	Black Barn Amphitheatre		2,000	
Philippines	Metro Manila	Marikina	Riverbanks Amphitheater		20,000	
Poland	Pomeranian Voivodeship	Sopot	Forest Opera	Tensile membrane roof	5,047	
Poland	West Pomeranian Voivodeship	Kołobrzeg	Kołobrzeg Amphitheatre	Roof only	4,500	
Netherlands	Amstelveen	Amsterdamse Bos	Amsterdamse Bos Theater	Not covered	1,500	
Qatar	Doha	Katara Cultural Village	Amphitheatre of Katara	Not covered	3,800	
Russia	Bashkortostan	Ufa	Ufa Amphitheatre	Not covered	5,000	
South Africa	Gauteng	Pretoria	Nelson Mandela Amphitheatre	Not covered	9,000	
Spain	Catalonia	Barcelona	Teatre Grec	Not covered	1,900	
Spain	Catalonia	Barcelona	Fòrum: Parc dels Auditoris	Not covered	3,500	
Spain	Galicia	Santiago de Compostela	Auditorio Monte do Gozo	Not covered	37,800	
Sweden	Dalarna	Rättvik	Dalhalla	Tent	4,000	The Dalhalla Amphitheatre is located in a former limestone quarry in Sweden.
Taiwan	Taichung	Nantun District	Fulfillment Amphitheater		6,000	
Turkey	Istanbul Province	Istanbul	Cemil Topuzlu Harbiye Amphitheatre	Square enclosure	3,972	The Cemil Topuzlu Open-Air Theatre in Istanbul, Turkey before the Loreena McKennitt concert on 13 June 2009
United Arab Emirates	Dubai	Dubai	Media City Amphitheatre		15,000	
United Arab Emirates	Sharjah	Sharjah	Al Majaz Amphitheatre	Greek theatre	4500	Distant side view of Al Majaz Amphitheatre in 2018
United Kingdom	England	Milton Keynes	National Bowl	Square enclosure	65,000	Stage at the Bowl, 2023
United Kingdom	England	Aldershot	Rushmoor Arena	Not covered	30,000	
United States	Alabama	Albertville	Sand Mountain Amphitheater		7,600	
United States	Alabama	Birmingham	Coca-Cola Amphitheater		9,300	
United States	Alabama	Huntsville	Orion Amphitheater		8,000	
United States	Alabama	Orange Beach	The Wharf Amphitheater		10,000	
United States	Alabama	Tuscaloosa	Tuscaloosa Amphitheater	Roof only	8,410	
United States	Arizona	Mesa	Mesa Amphitheatre	square enclosure	4,950	
United States	Arizona	Phoenix	Talking Stick Resort Amphitheatre	Square enclosure	20,106	
United States	Arizona	Tucson	AVA Amphitheater	Square enclosure	5,000	
United States	Arkansas	Hot Springs	Timberwood Amphitheater at Magic Springs		5,000	
United States	Arkansas	Little Rock	Riverfest Amphitheater	Roof only	10,000	
United States	Arkansas	Rogers	Walmart Arkansas Music Pavilion	Roof only	9,500	
United States	California	Berkeley	Hearst Greek Theatre	Not covered	8,500	
United States	California	Burbank	Starlight Bowl	Square enclosure	5,000	
United States	California	Chula Vista	North Island Credit Union Amphitheatre		20,500	
United States	California	Concord	Concord Pavilion	Square enclosure	12,500	
United States	California	Costa Mesa	Pacific Amphitheatre	Scaffolding only	8,042	
United States	California	Devore	Glen Helen Amphitheater	Square enclosure	65,000	
United States	California	Los Angeles	Greek Theatre		5,870	
United States	California	Los Angeles	Hollywood Bowl	Shell	17,500	
United States	California	Los Angeles	John Anson Ford Amphitheatre		1,200	
United States	California	Mill Valley – Mount Tamalpais State Park	Sidney B. Cushing Memorial Amphitheatre (Mountain Theater)	None	4,000	
United States	California	Mountain View	Shoreline Amphitheatre	Tent	22,500	
United States	California	Murphys	Ironstone Amphitheatre	Roof only	4,950	
United States	California	Oceanside	Junior Seau Pier Amphitheatre	Square enclosure	2,500	
United States	California	Palmdale	Palmdale Amphitheater		12,000	
United States	California	Paso Robles	Vina Robles Amphitheatre	Square enclosure	3,300	
United States	California	Rancho Mirage	Rancho Mirage Amphitheater		2,909	
United States	California	Redlands	Redlands Bowl	Shell	5,000	
United States	California	Rocklin	Quarry Park Amphitheater		1,850	
United States	California	San Diego	CalCoast Credit Union Open Air Theatre		4,500	
United States	California	San Diego	Humphrey's by the Bay		1,200	
United States	California	San Diego	Mount Helix Amphitheater	Not covered	1,600	
United States	California	San Diego	Starlight Bowl	Square enclosure	4,300	
United States	California	San Diego	The Rady Shell at Jacobs Park		10,000	
United States	California	San Francisco	Jerry Garcia Amphitheater	Not covered	3,200	
United States	California	Santa Barbara	Santa Barbara Bowl	Square enclosure	4,562	
United States	California	Saratoga	Mountain Winery		2,500	
United States	California	Seal Beach	Leisure World Amphitheater	Not covered	2,500	
United States	California	Stanford	Frost Amphitheater		8,000	
United States	California	Vista	Moonlight Amphitheater	Square enclosure	2,500	
United States	California	Wheatland	Toyota Amphitheatre	Square enclosure	18,500	
United States	Colorado	Colorado Springs	Ford Amphitheater		8,000	
United States	Colorado	Dillon	Dillon Amphitheater		3,656	
United States	Colorado	Grand Junction	Los Colonias Amphitheatre		4,000	
United States	Colorado	Greenwood Village	Fiddler's Green Amphitheatre	Roof only	18,000	
United States	Colorado	Morrison	Red Rocks Amphitheatre	Not covered	9,525	A view of the seating at Red Rocks Amphitheatre
United States	Colorado	Vail	Gerald R. Ford Amphitheater	Roof only	2,565	
United States	Connecticut	Bridgeport	Hartford HealthCare Amphitheater		5,700	
United States	Connecticut	Hartford	The Meadows Music Theatre		30,000	
United States	Connecticut	Wallingford	Toyota Oakdale Theatre		4,803	
United States	Florida	Clearwater	The BayCare Sound		9,000	
United States	Florida	Crystal River	Rock Crusher Canyon Amphitheater		5,000	
United States	Florida	Daytona Beach	Daytona Beach Bandshell	Shell	4,500	
United States	Florida	Fort Myers	Caloosa Sound Amphitheater		3,000	
United States	Florida	Jacksonville	Daily's Place		5,500	
United States	Florida	Key West	Coffee Butler Amphitheater		4,000	
United States	Florida	Lake Buena Vista	Hollywood Hills Amphitheater		10,000	
United States	Florida	Miami	FPL Solar Amphitheater at Bayfront Park		10,000	
United States	Florida	Miramar	Miramar Regional Park Amphitheater		5,000	
United States	Florida	New Port Richey	Sims Park Amphitheater		2,000	
United States	Florida	Orlando	Universal Music Plaza Stage		8,000	
United States	Florida	Panama City Beach	Aaron Bessant Park Amphitheater		7,500	
United States	Florida	Pensacola	Hunter Amphitheater at the Pensacola Maritime Park		5,000	
United States	Florida	Pompano Beach	Pompano Beach Amphitheater		10,000	
United States	Florida	St. Augustine	St. Augustine Amphitheatre	Tent	4,092	
United States	Florida	Tallahassee	Adderley Amphitheater at Cascades Park		3,500	
United States	Florida	Tampa	MidFlorida Credit Union Amphitheatre		20,000	
United States	Florida	West Palm Beach	ITHINK Financial Amphitheatre	Roof only	20,000	
United States	Georgia	Alpharetta	Ameris Bank Amphitheatre		12,000	
United States	Georgia	Atlanta	Cellairis Amphitheatre	Square enclosure	18,920	
United States	Georgia	Atlanta	Synovus Bank Amphitheater	Square enclosure	6,900	
United States	Georgia	Atlanta	Historic Fourth Ward Park Amphitheater	Not covered	1,000	
United States	Georgia	Peachtree City	Frederick Brown Jr. Amphitheater		2,500	
United States	Georgia	Ringgold	Northwest Georgia Amphitheatre	Roof only	3,500	
United States	Hawaii	Honolulu	Waikiki Shell	Shell	8,400	
United States	Idaho	Pocatello	Portneuf Health Trust Amphitheater	Square Enclosure	11,000	
United States	Idaho	Nampa	Ford Idaho Center Amphitheatre		10,500	
United States	Illinois	Chicago	Huntington Bank Pavilion	Roof only	30,000	
United States	Illinois	Chicago	Jay Pritzker Pavilion		11,000	
United States	Illinois	Chicago	SkyLine Stage		1,200	
United States	Illinois	Decatur	Devon Lakeshore Amphitheater		3,000	
United States	Illinois	Highland Park	Ravinia Pavilion		3,350	
United States	Illinois	Peoria	Glen Oak Amphitheatre		1,200	
United States	Illinois	Tinley Park	Credit Union 1 Amphitheatre		28,739	
United States	Indiana	Fishers	Nickel Plate District Amphitheater	Square enclosure	4,000	
United States	Indiana	Fort Wayne	Foellinger Theater	Roof	2,751	
United States	Indiana	Indianapolis	MacAllister Center for the Performing Arts	Square enclosure	5,000	
United States	Indiana	Indianapolis	Everwise Amphitheater at White River State Park	Square enclosure	6,000	
United States	Indiana	Indianapolis	Taggart Memorial Amphitheatre	Not covered	2,000	
United States	Indiana	Lincoln City	Lincoln Amphitheatre	Roof	1,500	
United States	Indiana	Noblesville	Ruoff Music Center	Square enclosure	24,790	
United States	Indiana	Terre Haute	The Mill Amphitheater		6,000	
United States	Indiana	West Lafayette	Slayter Center of Performing Arts Amphitheatre	Roof only	20,000	
United States	Iowa	Council Bluffs	Westfair Amphitheater		15,000	
United States	Iowa	Des Moines	Susan Knapp Amphitheater		5,000	
United States	Kansas	Bonner Springs	Sandstone Amphitheater		18,000	
United States	Kentucky	Beaver Dam	Beaver Dam Amphitheater		4,000	
United States	Kentucky	Louisville	Iroquois Amphitheatre	Not covered	2,407	
United States	Kentucky	Newport	MegaCorp Pavilion	Not covered	7,000	
United States	Maine	Bangor	Maine Savings Amphitheater	Roof only	15,000	
United States	Maine	Old Orchard Beach	Seaside Pavilion	Square enclosure	1,400	
United States	Maryland	Baltimore	Pier Six Pavilion	Tent	4,600	
United States	Maryland	Columbia	Merriweather Post Pavilion	Square enclosure	19,319	
United States	Massachusetts	Boston	Leader Bank Pavilion		5,200	
United States	Massachusetts	Cohasset	South Shore Music Circus	Tent	2,300	
United States	Massachusetts	Florence	Pines Theater		2,000	
United States	Massachusetts	Hyannis	Cape Cod Melody Tent	Tent	2,300	
United States	Massachusetts	Lenox	Koussevitzky Music Shed at Tanglewood	Covered seating and open lawn	20,000	
United States	Massachusetts	Mansfield	Xfinity Center		19,900	
United States	Massachusetts	Webster	Indian Ranch	Covered seating	3,000	
United States	Michigan	Chesaning	Chesaning Showboat Amphitheatre		6,600	
United States	Michigan	Clarkston	Pine Knob Music Theatre	Square enclosure	15,274	
United States	Michigan	Clio	Clio Amphitheatre		3,200	
United States	Michigan	Detroit	Aretha Franklin Amphitheater	Tent	6,000	
United States	Michigan	Grand Rapids	Acrisure Amphitheater	Roof	12,000	
United States	Michigan	Grand Rapids Charter Township	Frederik Meijer Gardens Amphitheater		1,900	
United States	Michigan	Rochester	Meadow Brook Amphitheatre at Oakland University		7,700	
United States	Michigan	Sterling Heights	Michigan Lottery Amphitheatre at Freedom Hill	Roof	7,310	
United States	Minnesota	Apple Valley	Weesner Family Amphitheater		1,500	
United States	Minnesota	Chisholm	Minnesota Discovery Center Amphitheater		1,600	
United States	Minnesota	Edina	Centennial Lakes Park		1,000	
United States	Minnesota	Hinckley	Grand Casino Hinckley Amphitheater	Square enclosure	12,000	
United States	Minnesota	Moorhead	Bluestem Amphitheater	Roof only	3,000	
United States	Minnesota	Shakopee	Mystic Lake Amphitheater	Roof only	19,000	
United States	Mississippi	Brandon	Brandon Amphitheater		8,300	
United States	Mississippi	Southaven	BankPlus Amphitheater at Snowden Grove		11,000	
United States	Missouri	Branson	Echo Hollow Amphitheatre		4,000	
United States	Missouri	Camdenton	Ozarks Amphitheater		10,222	
United States	Missouri	Chesterfield	Chesterfield Amphitheater		4,000	
United States	Missouri	Kansas City	Starlight Theatre	Square enclosure	7,958	
United States	Missouri	Lampe	Black Oak Mountain Amphitheater		9,000	
United States	Missouri	Maryland Heights	Hollywood Casino Amphitheatre		20,000	
United States	Missouri	St. Louis	The Muny		11,000	
United States	Montana	Bonner	KettleHouse Amphitheater		4,250	
United States	Nebraska	La Vista	The Astro Amphitheater		5,500	
United States	Nebraska	Lincoln	Pinewood Bowl Theater	Roof only	5,500	
United States	Nebraska	Papillion	SumTur Amphitheater		1,500	
United States	Nevada	Henderson	Sunset Amphitheater at Sunset Station		5,000	
United States	New Hampshire	Gilford	BankNH Pavilion		8,300	
United States	New Jersey	Camden	Freedom Mortgage Pavilion	Square enclosure	24,488	
United States	New Jersey	Holmdel	PNC Bank Arts Center		17,500	
United States	New Mexico	Albuquerque	First Financial Credit Union Amphitheater		15,000	
United States	New York	Baldwinsville	Baldwinsville Amphitheater at Paper Mill Island		3,500	
United States	New York	New York City	Central Park SummerStage		5,000	
United States	New York	Bethel	Bethel Woods Center for the Arts	Roof	15,000	
United States	New York	New York City	Delacorte Theater		1,800	
United States	New York	New York City	Ford Amphitheater at Coney Island		5,000	
United States	New York	Canandaigua	Constellation Brands – Marvin Sands Performing Arts Center	Roof	15,000	
United States	New York	Chautauqua	Chautauqua Amphitheater	roof	6,000	The Chautauqua Amphitheater during a lecture that took place during the 2022 Summer Assembly Season
United States	New York	Darien	Darien Lake Performing Arts Center	Roof	21,600	
United States	New York	Farmingville	Catholic Health Amphitheater at Bald Hill	Open air	7,000	
United States	New York	Lewiston	Artpark Outdoor Amphitheater	Open Air	20,000	
United States	New York	Saratoga Springs	Saratoga Performing Arts Center	Roof	25,103	Saratoga Performing Arts Center is an open-air amphitheatre, but has a roof and two stories of seating.
United States	Syracuse	Empower Federal Credit Union Amphitheater	Roof	17,500		
United States	Wantagh	Northwell Health at Jones Beach Theater	Shell	15,000	Nikon at Jones Beach Theater is right on the water. This aerial photo is from 1959.	
United States	North Carolina	Cary	Koka Booth Amphitheatre		7,000	
United States	North Carolina	Charlotte	The Amp Ballantyne		3,500	
United States	North Carolina	Charlotte	Carowinds Paladium		13,000	
United States	North Carolina	Charlotte	Skyla Credit Union Amphitheatre		5,000	
United States	North Carolina	Charlotte	Truliant Amphitheater		19,500	
United States	North Carolina	Greensboro	White Oak Amphitheatre		7,061	
United States	North Carolina	Raleigh	North Carolina Museum of Art		2,700	
United States	North Carolina	Raleigh	Raleigh Little Theatre		1,700	
United States	North Carolina	Raleigh	Red Hat Amphitheater		5,990	
United States	North Carolina	Raleigh	Coastal Credit Union Music Park		20,601	
United States	North Carolina	Roanoke Rapids	Carolina Crossroads Amphitheater		1,500	
United States	North Carolina	Wilmington	Greenfield Lake Amphitheater		1,200	
United States	Ohio	Cincinnati	Riverbend Music Center		20,500	
United States	Ohio	Cleveland	Jacobs Pavilion at Nautica		5,000	
United States	Ohio	Columbus	KEMBA Live!		5,200	
United States	Ohio	Columbus	Celeste Center		10,200	
United States	Ohio	Cuyahoga Falls	Blossom Music Center		23,000	
United States	Ohio	Huber Heights	Rose Music Center	Fully Covered Roof	4,200	
United States	Ohio	Kettering	Fraze Pavilion	Square enclosure	4,300	
United States	Ohio	Mason	Timberwolf Amphitheater		7,400	
United States	Ohio	Toledo	Toledo Zoo Amphitheater		4,500	
United States	Ohio	Youngstown	Youngstown Foundation Amphitheatre	Roof only	4,800	
United States	Oklahoma	Oklahoma City	Starlight Amphitheater		8,000	
United States	Oklahoma	Oklahoma City	OKC Zoo Amphitheater		2,000	
United States	Oregon	Bend	Hayden Homes Amphitheater	Roof only	8,000	
United States	Oregon	Central Point	Bi-Mart Amphitheater		6,000	
United States	Oregon	Eugene	Cuthbert Amphitheatre		4,500	
United States	Oregon	Jacksonville	Britt Pavilion		2,200	
United States	Oregon	Salem	L. B. Day Amphitheatre	Shell	14,000	
United States	Pennsylvania	Bensalem	Penn Community Bank Amphitheater		3,000	
United States	Pennsylvania	Burgettstown	The Pavilion at Star Lake		23,100	
United States	Pennsylvania	Bushkill	Tom Ridge Pavilion at Mountain Laurel Center for the Performing Arts		10,009	
United States	Pennsylvania	Philadelphia	Mann Center for the Performing Arts	Square Enclosure	14,000	
United States	Pennsylvania	Philadelphia	Dell Music Center	Square enclosure	5,884	
United States	Pennsylvania	Pittsburgh	Stage AE		5,500	
United States	Pennsylvania	Scranton	The Pavilion at Montage Mountain	Tent	16,000	
United States	Puerto Rico	San Juan	Tito Puente Amphitheatre (Spanish: Anfiteatro Tito Puente)		3,000	
United States	South Carolina	Simpsonville	Heritage Park Amphitheatre	Square enclosure	15,000	
United States	South Carolina	Clemson	Clemson University – Outdoor Theater	Not covered	2,500	
United States	Tennessee	Franklin	FirstBank Amphitheater	Roof only	7,500	
United States	Tennessee	Knoxville	Tennessee Amphitheater	Covered	1,400	
United States	Tennessee	Nashville	Ascend Amphitheater	Roof only	6,800	
United States	Tennessee	Memphis	Mud Island Amphitheater	Roof only	5,000	
United States	Texas	Austin	Germania Insurance Amphitheater within Circuit of the Americas		14,000	
United States	Texas	Austin	Moody Amphitheater	Lawn and seating	5,000	
United States	Texas	Austin	LifeAustin Amphitheatre		1,500	
United States	Texas	Beaumont	Ford Pavilion	Square enclosure facing 6,300 seats under cover and 8,000 lawn seats	14,300	
United States	Texas	College Station	Wolf Pen Creek Amphitheater		7,000	
United States	Texas	Corpus Christi	Concrete Street Amphitheatre		3,000	
United States	Texas	Dallas	Dos Equis Pavilion		20,000	
United States	Texas	Houston	Miller Outdoor Theatre	Covered	6,200	
United States	Texas	New Braunfels	Whitewater Amphitheater	Covered	5,600	
United States	Texas	Palo Duro Canyon	Pioneer Amphitheatre	Not covered	1,800	
United States	Texas	Selma	Real Life Amphitheater		20,000	
United States	Texas	Tyler	Bergfeld Park Amphitheater		1,700	
United States	Texas	The Woodlands	Cynthia Woods Mitchell Pavilion		16,500	
United States	United States Virgin Islands	Saint Thomas	Reichhold Center for the Arts	Not covered	1,196	
United States	Utah	Ivins	Tuacahn Amphitheatre	Not covered	1,920	
United States	Utah	Provo	Recreation Center "The Castle", Utah State Hospital		1,000	
United States	Utah	Salt Lake City	Red Butte Garden Amphitheatre	Roof only	3,000	
United States	Utah	Sandy	Sandy Amphitheater		2,700	
United States	Utah	Sundance	"Eccles Outdoor Stage", Sundance Resort	Not covered	1,400	
United States	Utah	West Valley City	Utah First Credit Union Amphitheatre	Square enclosure	20,000	
United States	Vermont	Essex Junction	The Champlain Valley Expo	Partial Roof, flat floor	12,500	
United States	Virginia	Arlington National Cemetery	Arlington Memorial Amphitheater	Shell	5,000	Arlington Memorial Amphitheater has been the site of numerous Memorial Day and Veterans Day ceremonies, as well as hosting the funerals of many famous Americans.
United States	Virginia	Bristow	Jiffy Lube Live	Square enclosure	25,262	
United States	Virginia	Charlottesville	McIntire Amphitheatre	Not covered	1,500	
United States	Virginia	Charlottesville	Ting Pavilion	Tent	3,500	
United States	Virginia	Danville	Blue Ridge Amphitheater		2,500	
United States	Virginia	Doswell	Kingswood Amphitheatre at Kings Dominion		7,000	
United States	Virginia	Portsmouth	Atlantic Union Bank Pavilion	Tent	6,500	
United States	Virginia	Richmond	Virginia Credit Union Live!	Square enclosure	6,000	
United States	Virginia	Vienna	Filene Center at Wolf Trap National Park for the Performing Arts	Shell	7,028	
United States	Virginia	Virginia Beach	Veterans United Home Loans Amphitheater	Square enclosure	20,000	
United States	Virginia	Williamsburg	Martha Wren Briggs Amphitheatre at Lake Matoaka	Roof only	1,700	
United States	Washington	Auburn	White River Amphitheatre	Roof only	16,000	
United States	Washington	George	The Gorge Amphitheatre	Roof only	20,000	
United States	Washington	Ridgefield	RV Inn Style Resorts Amphitheater	Square enclosure	18,000	
United States	Washington, D.C.		Carter Barron Amphitheatre	Roof only	4,000	
United States	West Virginia	Glen Jean	AT&T Summit Stadium	Tent	80,000	
United States	West Virginia	Grandview	Cliffside Amphitheatre	Not covered	1,259	
United States	Wisconsin	Arcadia	Millennium Amphitheater		4,500	
United States	Wisconsin	East Troy	Alpine Valley Music Theatre	Roof only	37,000	
United States	Wisconsin	Milwaukee	American Family Insurance Amphitheater	Square enclosure	23,000	
BMO Harris Pavilion	Wisconsin	Milwaukee		10,000		
Somerset	Wisconsin	Somerset Amphitheater	Roof only	40,000		
Spring Green	Wisconsin	American Players Theater	Not Covered	1,148		
Uruguay	Montevideo	Montevideo	Teatro de Verano	Covered stage	40,000	

== See also ==
- List of concert halls
- List of jazz venues
- List of opera houses
- List of Roman amphitheatres
- Lists of stadiums
