= Starlight Bowl =

Starlight Bowl may refer to the following amphitheaters in California, United States:

- Starlight Bowl (Burbank, California)
- Starlight Bowl (San Diego)
