= Ford Amphitheatre =

Ford Amphitheatre may refer to:

- MidFlorida Credit Union Amphitheatre, originally Ford Amphitheatre, in Tampa, Florida, U.S.
- John Anson Ford Amphitheatre, in Hollywood, California, U.S.
- Ford Amphitheater at Coney Island, in Brooklyn, New York, U.S.
- Gerald R. Ford Amphitheater, in Vail, Colorado, U.S., a music venue in Colorado
- Ford Amphitheater (Colorado Springs, Colorado), U.S., a music venue in Colorado

== See also ==
- Ford Park, a multi-purpose park and arena in Beaumont, Texas, U.S.
- Ford Idaho Center, a complex of sports and entertainment venues in Nampa, Idaho, U.S.
