= Live Trax =

Live Trax may refer to:

- Live Trax (Megadeth EP), 1997 EP by Megadeth
- Live Trax (series), a series of live albums by Dave Matthews Band
  - Live Trax (Dave Matthews Band album), 2007
