= Centennial Lakes Park (Minnesota) =

Park in Edina, Minnesota, United States

Coordinates: 44°52′1″N 93°19′32″W

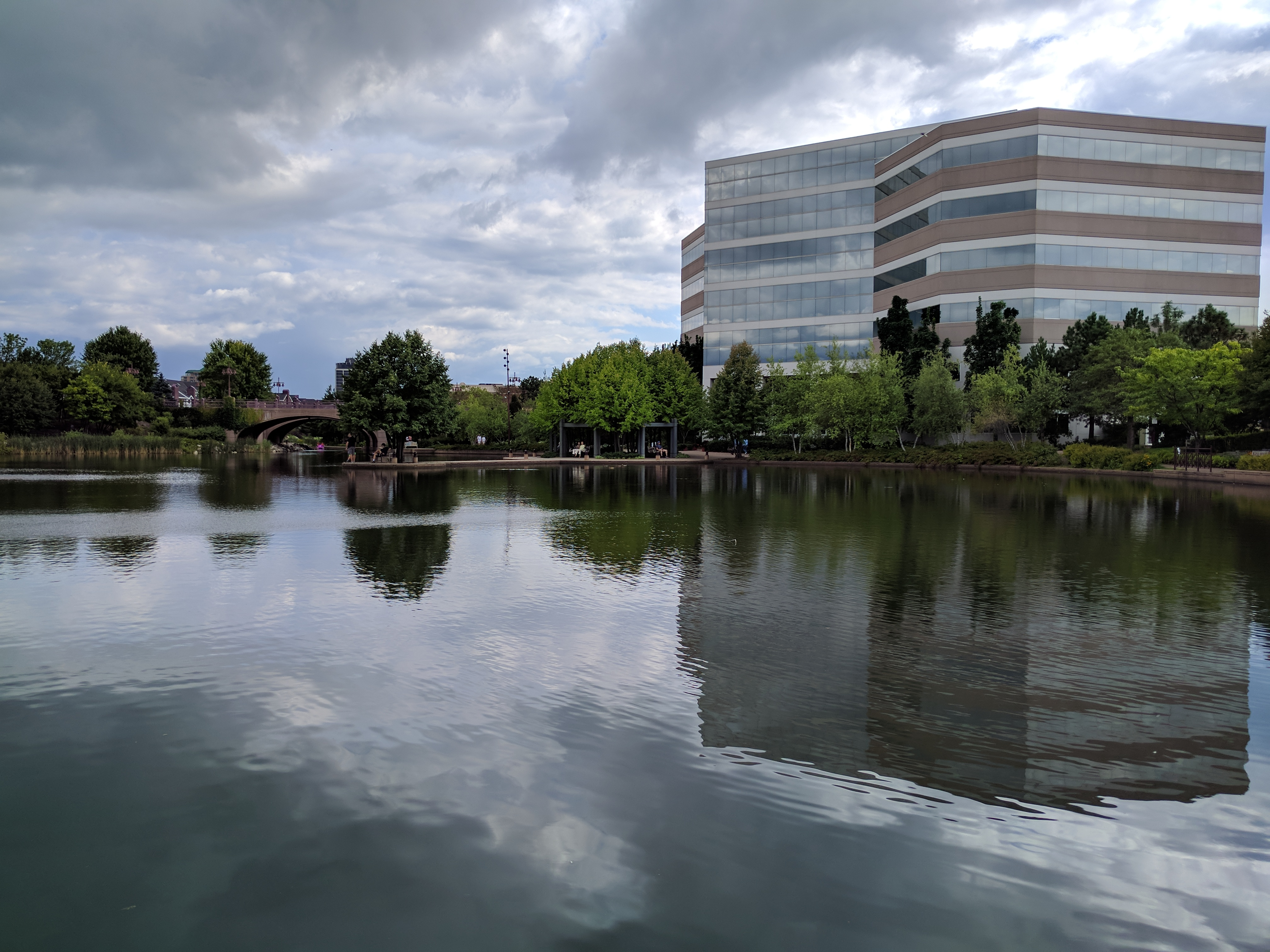
Centennial Lakes Park

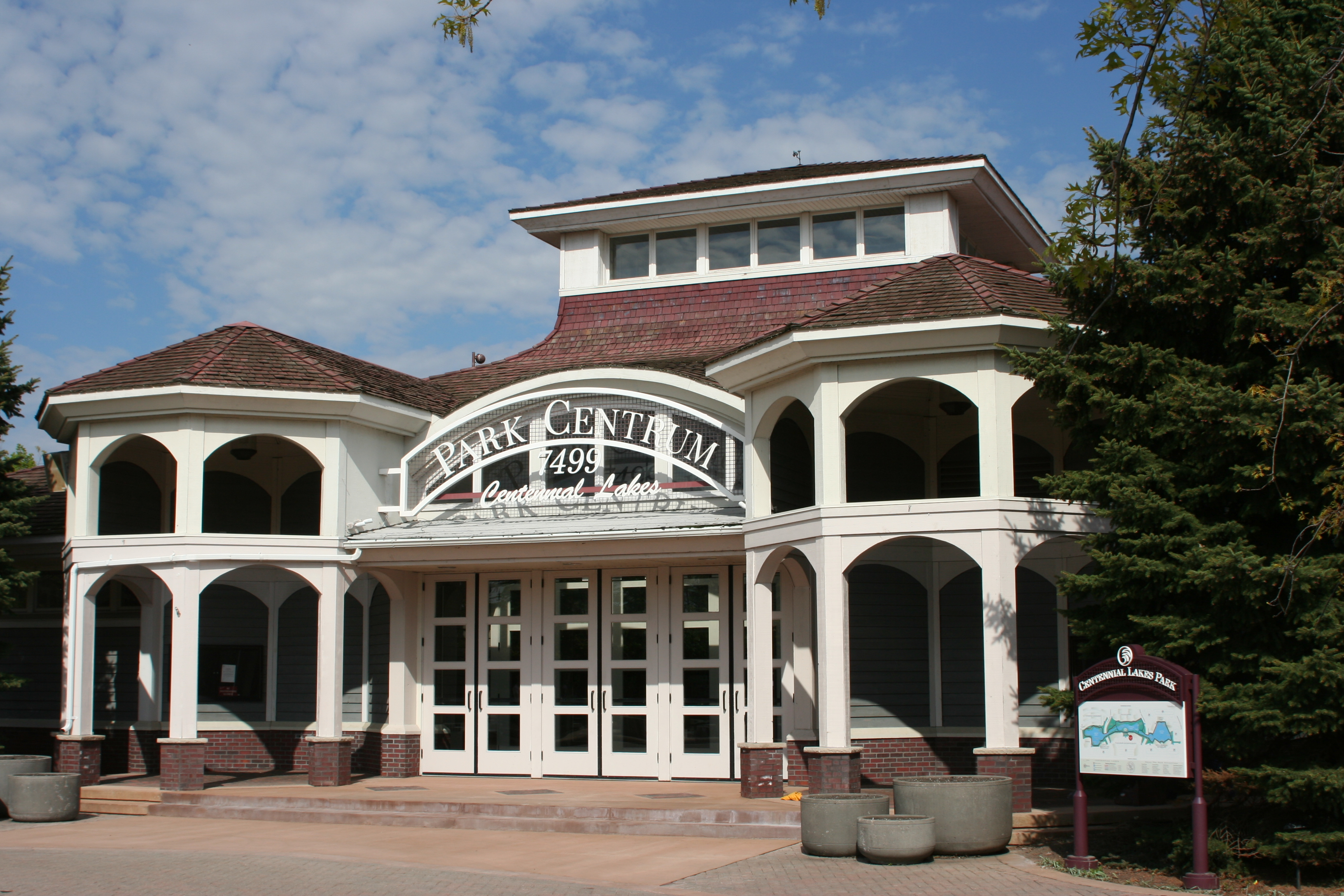
Centennial Lakes Park Centrum

Centennial Lakes Park is a 24-acre (97,000 m^{2}) park and man-made pond located in the southeast portion of Edina, Minnesota, United States. The park features more than 1.5 miles (2.4 km) of paved pathways meandering around a 10-acre (40,000 m^{2}) lake and interspersed with landscaped grounds, formal and informal seating areas, swinging benches and fountains.

In addition, the park features a miniature golf course. There is a wide space for lawn bowling and paddleboats can be rented as well.

== See also ==
- List of contemporary amphitheatres
