= Penn Community Bank Amphitheater =

Amphitheater

Coordinates: 40.10722°N 74.94293°W

The Penn Community Bank Amphitheater is an amphitheater located in Bensalem, Pennsylvania. It was previously known as TD Bank Amphitheater, Commerce Bank Amphitheater, and Bensalem Performing Arts Center. The amphitheater is located in Bensalem Township's Central Park at 2400 Byberry Road, adjacent to the Municipal Complex.

The amphitheater can accommodate 3,000+ people in open lawn seating, and is open for outdoor concerts from May through September.

== The Summer Concerts ==
During the summer there are regularly scheduled outdoor concerts featuring cover bands on Wednesday nights. The concerts start at 7 pm and end around 9:30. Attendees bring their own chair and there is a stand that sells hot dogs, drinks, and snacks. The concerts are not free - attendees must pay to attend - but season tickets are available to purchase.

== The Fall Festival ==
Bensalem Township holds an annual Fall Festival at the amphitheater every year on the first Saturday in October. The festival includes an evening concert and fireworks.

== See also ==
- List of contemporary amphitheatres
