= Live Trax (series) =

Live album series by Dave Matthews Band

Live Trax is a series of live albums released by Dave Matthews Band's Bama Rags label. The albums in the series feature performances by Dave Matthews Band and also Dave Matthews and Tim Reynolds. The majority of the releases are not sold in commercial stores, but rather by means of order or download from the band's official website. The name Live Trax is a reference to the former Trax Nightclub in Charlottesville, Virginia, where the band played over 120 shows during their early years from 1991 to 1996.

Only the sixth volume of the series was sold outside of the band's website, due to a high demand in the Boston, Massachusetts area. The album was sold in stores in addition to the band's online store. In July 2007, Starbucks released a nine-track compilation of the series, simply titled Live Trax, featuring selected tracks from the first nine volumes of the series.

== List of albums ==
List of albums, with selected chart positions and recording information
Title	Personnel	Album details	Peak chart positions US	Recording information
Live Trax Vol. 1	Dave Matthews Band	Released: November 2, 2004; Label: RCA; Formats: CD, Vinyl	—	Recorded on December 8, 1998, at Centrum Centre, Worcester, Massachusetts.
Live Trax Vol. 2	Dave Matthews Band	Released: December 17, 2004; Label: RCA; Formats: CD, Vinyl	—	Recorded on September 12, 2004 at Golden Gate Park, San Francisco, California.
Live Trax Vol. 3	Dave Matthews Band	Released: March 17, 2005; Label: RCA; Formats: CD, Vinyl	—	Recorded on August 27, 2000 at Meadows Music Theatre, Hartford, Connecticut.
Live Trax Vol. 4	Dave Matthews Band	Released: September 2, 2005; Label: RCA; Formats: CD, Vinyl	—	Recorded on April 30, 1996, at Classic Amphitheatre, Richmond, Virginia.
Live Trax Vol. 5	Dave Matthews Band	Released: May 26, 2006; Label: RCA; Formats: CD, Vinyl	—	Recorded on August 23, 1995, at Meadow Brook Music Festival, Rochester Hills, Michigan.
Live Trax Vol. 6	Dave Matthews Band	Released: September 26, 2006; Label: RCA; Formats: CD, Vinyl	37	Recorded from July 7–8, 2006, at Fenway Park, Boston, Massachusetts.
Live Trax Vol. 7	Dave Matthews Band	Released: December 12, 2006; Label: RCA; Formats: CD, download, Vinyl	—	Recorded on December 31, 1996, at Hampton Coliseum, Hampton, Virginia.
Live Trax Vol. 8	Dave Matthews Band	Released: March 20, 2007; Label: RCA; Formats: CD, download	—	Recorded on August 7, 2004 at Alpine Valley Music Theatre, East Troy, Wisconsin.
Live Trax Vol. 9	Dave Matthews Band	Released: June 5, 2007; Label: RCA; Formats: CD, download	—	Recorded from March 23–24, 2007 at MGM Grand Garden Arena, Paradise, Nevada.
Live Trax Vol. 10	Dave Matthews Band	Released: November 6, 2007; Label: RCA; Formats: CD, download	—	Recorded on May 25, 2007 at Pavilhão Atlântico, Lisbon, Portugal.
Live Trax Vol. 11	Dave Matthews Band	Released: March 25, 2008; Label: RCA; Formats: CD, download	—	Recorded on August 29, 2000 at Saratoga Performing Arts Center, Saratoga Springs, New York.
Live Trax Vol. 12	Dave Matthews Band	Released: July 1, 2008; Label: RCA; Formats: CD, download	—	Recorded on May 5, 1995, at L.B. Day Amphitheater, Salem, Oregon.
Live Trax Vol. 13	Dave Matthews Band	Released: October 14, 2008; Label: RCA; Formats: CD, download	—	Recorded on June 7, 2008 at Busch Stadium, St. Louis, Missouri.
Live Trax Vol. 14	Dave Matthews Band	Released: March 24, 2009; Label: RCA; Formats: CD, download	—	Recorded on June 28, 2008 at Nissan Pavilion at Stone Ridge, Bristow, Virginia.
Live Trax Vol. 15	Dave Matthews Band	Released: June 2, 2009; Label: RCA; Formats: CD, download	—	Recorded on August 9, 2008 at Alpine Valley Music Theatre, East Troy, Wisconsin.
Live Trax Vol. 16	Dave Matthews Band	Released: September 15, 2009; Label: RCA; Formats: CD, download	—	Recorded on June 26, 2000 at Riverbend Music Center, Cincinnati, Ohio.
Live Trax Vol. 17	Dave Matthews Band	Released: May 4, 2010; Label: RCA; Formats: CD, download	—	Recorded on July 6, 1997, at Shoreline Amphitheatre, Mountain View, California.
Live Trax Vol. 18	Dave Matthews Band	Released: August 27, 2010; Label: RCA; Formats: CD, download	—	Recorded on June 4, 1996, at Virginia Beach Amphitheater, Virginia Beach, Virginia.
Live Trax Vol. 19	Dave Matthews Band	Released: November 5, 2010; Label: RCA; Formats: CD, download	—	Recorded on September 30, 2008 at Vivo Rio, Rio de Janeiro, Brazil.
Live Trax Vol. 20	Dave Matthews Band	Released: May 15, 2011; Label: RCA; Formats: CD, download	—	Recorded on August 19, 1993, at Wetlands Preserve, New York, New York.
Live Trax Vol. 21	Dave Matthews Band	Released: February 28, 2012; Label: RCA; Formats: CD, download	—	Recorded on August 4, 1995, at Soma San Diego, San Diego, California.
Live Trax Vol. 22	Dave Matthews Band	Released: June 10, 2012; Label: RCA; Formats: CD, download	—	Recorded on July 14, 2010 at Montage Mountain, Scranton, Pennsylvania.
Live Trax Vol. 23	Dave Matthews and Tim Reynolds (acoustic)	Released: December 12, 2012; Label: RCA; Formats: CD, download	—	Recorded on February 19, 1996, at University of New Hampshire, Durham, New Hampshire.
Live Trax Vol. 24	Dave Matthews and Tim Reynolds (acoustic)	Released: December 12, 2012; Label: RCA; Formats: CD, download	—	Recorded on February 8, 1997, at Spartanburg Memorial Auditorium, Spartanburg, South Carolina.
Live Trax Vol. 25	Dave Matthews Band	Released: May 17, 2013; Label: RCA; Formats: CD, download	—	Recorded on May 30, 2006 at UMB Bank Pavilion, Maryland Heights, Missouri.
Live Trax Vol. 26	Dave Matthews Band	Released: August 6, 2013; Label: RCA; Formats: CD, download	—	Recorded on July 30, 2003 at Sleep Train Amphitheatre, Marysville, California.
Live Trax Vol. 27	Dave Matthews Band	Released: November 12, 2013; Label: RCA; Formats: CD, download	—	Recorded on October 14, 2010 at Luna Park, Buenos Aires, Argentina.
Live Trax Vol. 28	Dave Matthews Band	Released: December 17, 2013; Label: RCA; Formats: CD, download, DVD	—	Recorded on November 19, 2010 at John Paul Jones Arena, Charlottesville, Virginia.
Live Trax Vol. 29	Dave Matthews Band	Released: April 15, 2014; Label: RCA; Formats: CD, download	—	Recorded on June 1, 2013 at Blossom Music Center, Cuyahoga Falls, Ohio.
Live Trax Vol. 30	Dave Matthews Band	Released: June 13, 2014; Label: RCA; Formats: CD, download	—	Recorded on August 16–18, 1993 at The Muse, Nantucket, Massachusetts.
Live Trax Vol. 31	Dave Matthews Band	Released: September 16, 2014; Label: RCA; Formats: CD, download	—	Recorded on June 23, 2001 at Susquehanna Bank Center, Camden, New Jersey.
Live Trax Vol. 32	Dave Matthews Band	Released: December 9, 2014; Label: RCA; Formats: CD, download, DVD	—	Recorded on August 23, 2014 at William Randolph Hearst Greek Theatre, Berkeley, California.
Live Trax Vol. 33	Dave Matthews Band	Released: May 5, 2015; Label: RCA; Formats: CD, download	—	Recorded on January 31, 1995, at Lupo's Heartbreak Hotel, Providence, Rhode Island.; Extra tracks recorded January 30, 1995.
Live Trax Vol. 34	Dave Matthews Band	Released: July 21, 2015; Label: RCA; Formats: CD, download	—	Recorded on June 24, 1999, at Deer Creek Music Center, Noblesville, Indiana.
Live Trax Vol. 35	Dave Matthews Band	Released: October 16, 2015; Label: RCA; Formats: CD, download, Vinyl	—	Recorded on June 20, 2009, at Post-Gazette Pavilion, Burgettstown, Pennsylvania.
Live Trax Vol. 36	Dave Matthews Band	Released: December 11, 2015; Label: RCA; Formats: CD, download, DVD	—	Recorded on July 26, 2015, at Alpine Valley Music Theatre, East Troy, Wisconsin.
Live Trax Vol. 37	Dave Matthews Band	Released: April 8, 2016; Label: RCA; Formats: CD, download	—	Recorded on November 10, 1992, at Trax in Charlottesville, Virginia.
Live Trax Vol. 38	Dave Matthews Band	Released: July 15, 2016; Label: RCA; Formats: CD, download	—	Recorded on June 8, 1996, at Saratoga Performing Arts Center, Saratoga Springs, New York.
Live Trax Vol. 39	Dave Matthews Band	Released: November 4, 2016; Label: RCA; Formats: CD, download	—	Recorded on October 31, 1998, at The Arena in Oakland, Oakland, California.
Live Trax Vol. 40	Dave Matthews Band	Released: December 9, 2016; Label: RCA; Formats: CD, download, DVD, Blu-ray	—	Recorded on December 21, 2002, at Madison Square Garden, New York, New York.
Live Trax Vol. 41	Dave Matthews and Tim Reynolds (acoustic)	Released: May 9, 2017; Label: RCA; Formats: CD, download	—	Recorded on March 13, 1999, at Berkeley Community Theater, Berkeley, California.
Live Trax Vol. 42	Dave Matthews Band	Released: July 21, 2017; Label: RCA; Formats: CD, download	—	Recorded on September 14, 2007, at Sound Advice Amphitheatre, West Palm Beach, FL.
Live Trax Vol. 43	Dave Matthews Band	Released: September 22, 2017; Label: RCA; Formats: CD, download	—	Recorded on July 27, 2004, at HiFi Buys Amphitheatre, Atlanta, GA.
Live Trax Vol. 44	Dave Matthews Band	Released: December 10, 2017; Label: RCA; Formats: CD, download, Blu-ray	—	Recorded on September 4, 2016, at The Gorge Amphitheatre, George, WA.
Live Trax Vol. 45	Dave Matthews Band	Released: August 10, 2018; Label: RCA; Formats: CD, download	—	Recorded on June 29, 2013, at Susquehanna Bank Center, Camden, NJ.
Live Trax Vol. 46	Dave Matthews Band	Released: December 4, 2018; Label: RCA; Formats: CD, download, Blu-ray	—	Recorded on July 7, 2018, at Ruoff Home Mortgage Music Center, Noblesville, IN.
Live Trax Vol. 47	Dave Matthews Band	Released: March 29, 2019; Label: RCA; Formats: CD, download	—	Recorded on June 8, 1997, at Meadows Music Theatre, Hartford, CT.
Live Trax Vol. 48	Dave Matthews and Tim Reynolds (acoustic)	Released: September 10, 2019; Label: RCA; Formats: CD, download	—	Recorded on August 25, 1994, at The Birchmere, Alexandria, VA.
Live Trax Vol. 49	Dave Matthews and Tim Reynolds (acoustic)	Released: September 10, 2019; Label: RCA; Formats: CD, download	—	Recorded on June 18, 2019, at Marvin Sands Performing Arts Center, Canandaigua, NY.
Live Trax Vol. 50	Dave Matthews Band	Released: December 18, 2019; Label: RCA; Formats: CD, download	—	Recorded on July 10, 2004, at Hersheypark Stadium, Hershey, PA.
Live Trax Vol. 51	Dave Matthews Band	Released: April 24, 2020; Label: RCA; Formats: CD, download	—	Recorded on August 10, 2007, at Post-Gazette Pavilion, Burgettstown, PA.
Live Trax Vol. 52	Dave Matthews Band	Released: July 31, 2020; Label: RCA; Formats: CD, download	—	Recorded on June 6, 2014, at Darling's Waterfront Music Pavilion, Bangor, ME.
Live Trax Vol. 53	Dave Matthews Band	Released: October 9, 2020; Label: RCA; Formats: CD, download	—	Recorded on November 2, 1998, at Boise State University Pavilion, Boise, ID.
Live Trax Vol. 54	Dave Matthews Band	Released: December 11, 2020; Label: RCA; Formats: CD, download	—	Recorded on November 9, 1996, at Cow Palace, Daly City, CA.
Live Trax Vol. 55	Dave Matthews Band	Released: April 30, 2021; Label: RCA; Formats: CD, download	—	Recorded on April 29, 2009 at Ameris Bank Amphitheatre, Alpharetta, GA
Live Trax Vol. 56	Dave Matthews Band	Released: July 16, 2021; Label: RCA; Formats: CD, download	—	Recorded on August 10, 2001 at Molson Amphitheatre, Toronto, Canada
Live Trax Vol. 57	Dave Matthews Band	Released: October 22, 2021; Label: RCA; Formats: CD, download	—	Recorded on August 1, 1998 at Meadows Music Theatre, Hartford, Connecticut
Live Trax Vol. 58	Dave Matthews Band	Released: December 3, 2021; Label: RCA; Formats: CD, download, Vinyl	—	Recorded on June 22, 2000 at Deer Creek Music Center, Noblesville, Indiana
Live Trax Vol. 59	Dave Matthews Band	Released: April 29, 2022; Label: RCA; Formats: CD, download	—	Recorded on July 16, 2014 at MidFlorida Credit Union Amphitheatre, Tampa, Florida
Live Trax Vol. 60	Dave Matthews Band	Released: August 12, 2022; Label: RCA; Formats: CD, download	—	Recorded on August 20, 1995 at Cincinnati Music Hall in Cincinnati, Ohio
Live Trax Vol. 61	Dave Matthews Band	Released: September 30, 2022; Label: RCA; Formats: CD, download	—	Recorded on August 25, 2005 at Coors Amphitheatre in Chula Vista, California
Live Trax Vol. 62	Dave Matthews Band	Released: November 18, 2022; Label: RCA; Formats: CD, Vinyl, download	—	Recorded on June 25, 2010 at Blossom Music Center in Cuyahoga Falls, OH
Live Trax Vol. 63	Dave Matthews Band	Released: July 21, 2023; Label: RCA; Formats: CD, download	—	Recorded on July 6–7, 2012 at Alpine Valley Music Theatre in East Troy, WI
Live Trax Vol. 64	Dave Matthews Band	Released: November 24, 2023; Label: RCA; Formats: CD, Vinyl, download	—	Recorded on December 7, 2000 at Gund Arena in Cleveland, OH
Live Trax Vol. 65	Dave Matthews Band	Released: April 5, 2024; Label: RCA; Formats: CD, download	—	Recorded on June 12, 1997 at Great Woods Center for the Performing Arts in Mansfield, MA
Live Trax Vol. 66	Dave Matthews Band	Released: July 12, 2024; Label: RCA; Formats: CD, download	—	Recorded on May 19, 2002 at Shoreline Amphitheatre in Mountain View, CA
Live Trax Vol. 67	Dave Matthews Band	Released: October 25, 2024; Label: RCA; Formats: CD, download	—	Recorded on July 13, 2010 at Bethel Woods Center for the Arts in Bethel, NY
Live Trax Vol. 68	Dave Matthews Band	Released: November 29, 2024; Label: RCA; Formats: CD, Vinyl, download	—	Recorded on October 11, 2015 at MEO Arena in Lisbon, Portugal
Live Trax Vol. 69	Dave Matthews Band	Released: April 25, 2025; Label: RCA; Formats: CD, download	—	Recorded on July 16, 2024 at BankNH Pavilion in Gilford, New Hampshire
Live Trax Vol. 70	Dave Matthews Band	Released: July 11, 2025; Label: RCA; Formats: CD, download	—	Recorded on Aug. 13, 2005 at SBC Park in San Francisco, California
Live Trax Vol. 71	Dave Matthews Band	Released: October 31, 2025; Label: RCA; Formats: CD, download	—	Recorded on July 25, 2023 at Ameris Bank Amphitheatre in Alpharetta, Georgia
Live Trax Vol. 72	Dave Matthews Band	Released: December 10, 2025; Label: RCA; Formats: CD, Vinyl, download	—	Recorded on June 28, 2025 at Huntington Bank Pavilion at Northerly Island in Chicago, Illinois
"—" denotes releases that did not chart or were not released in that territory.
