= Venu (company) =

American entertainment and hospitality company

- Formerly: Notes Live
- Type: Public
- Traded as: AMEX: VENU
- Industry: Entertainment; Hospitality
- Founded: 2017
- Founder: J.W. Roth
- Headquarters: Colorado Springs, CO
- Brands: Ford Amphitheater; Sunset Amphitheater; Phil Long Music Hall; Bourbon Brothers Smokehouse and Tavern; The Hall at Bourbon Brothers
- Revenue: ▲US$17.9 million (2025)
- Net income: ▼ −US$44.1 million (2025)
- Website: venu.live

Venu Holding Corporation ("Venu") is a publicly-traded American entertainment and hospitality company based in Colorado Springs, Colorado. Founded by J.W. Roth in 2017 as Notes Live, Venu designs, develops, manages and owns music venues and event spaces including amphitheaters, restaurants, and concert halls in midsize cities.

== History ==
=== Founding, The Hall at Bourbon Brothers ===
Venu was founded by J.W. Roth. A lifelong music fan, he stepped down from his position as CEO of Roth Industries, a prepared foods company he founded, to focus on music. He founded Venu—then known as Notes Live - in 2017.

In 2019, Venu opened the restaurant Bourbon Brothers Smokehouse & Tavern, and the Hall at Bourbon Brothers, a 14,000-square-foot live music and event space renamed Phil Long Music Hall in 2025.

=== Sunset amphitheaters ===
In 2022, Venu began developing The Sunset Amphitheater in Colorado Springs. The blueprint for a series of open-air amphitheaters in growing cities that each use the name "Sunset" as a placeholder, the venues include privately-owned firepit suites and access to amenities including rooftop bars. Axios reported that the firepit suites in Colorado Springs sold out two years before the venue opened. Billboard included the Sunset in Colorado Springs on its list of venues to watch in 2022.

In March 2024, Venu announced the development of a $300 million, 46-acre, 20,000-capacity Sunset Amphitheater in McKinney, Texas, a suburb of Dallas–Fort Worth. A public-private partnership, it was expected to create 1300 direct and indirect jobs in the community. The summer 2026 opening of the $90 million Sunset in Broken Arrow, Oklahoma, a suburb of Tulsa, was reported in July 2025.

In June 2024 Ford bought the naming right for the Colorado Springs Sunset. Renamed the Ford Amphitheater, the $90 million venue opened in August 2024 with three sold-out OneRepublic shows. More than 20 touring artists played the Ford in 2024, including The Beach Boys, Primus, and Robert Plant and Alison Krauss. The second season began on April 30, 2025, with Jason Isbell and the 400 Unit. The Ford was nominated for the Pollstar Venue of the Year Award in 2024.

.In addition to the Phil Long Concert Hall in Colorado Springs, Venu owns the Hall at Bourbon Brothers in Gainesville, Georgia,a venue that hosts both live music and community events. A Bourbon Brothers concert hall in Centennial, Colorado, approximately 15 miles from Colorado Springs, was announced in April 2025.

=== Aikman Clubs and partnerships, IPO ===
Roth and football player Troy Aikman first discussed a partnership after Aikman's Eight Elite Light Beer was launched in 2022. In late 2024 it was announced that Venu and Aikman, a music fan, had partnered to develop the Aikman Club at the Sunset Amphitheaters in Texas and Oklahoma. The clubs were introduced with an ad that aired during Monday Night Football in November. In June 2025, Venu entered into an event-related partnership with Billboard, a hospitality parthership with Aramark Sports + Entertainment and a 4-venue ticketing partnership with the e-commerce platform Tixr. A booking partnership with AEG at the Ford has been in place since 2023.

Venu went public in November 2024. Listed on the New York Stock Exchange as VENU, $13 million was raised on the first day of trading. It was the first IPO for a Colorado Springs company. Roth rang the NYSE opening bell in January 2025.
