= Rushmoor Arena =

Outdoor arena in Aldershot, England

Coordinates: 51.260196°N 0.780739°W

Rushmoor Arena is an outdoor arena in Aldershot. It is a secure area of 28 Hectares (68 acres) surrounded by a security fence which is mainly hidden by trees. The central arena is a grassed level area of 4 Hectares with grassed amphitheatre banking on 3 sides. The arena was built by the British Army in 1923 for The Aldershot Military Tattoo. The venue has been used as a filming location and hosted many events, including The Aldershot Command Tattoo, The Aldershot Army Show, a three-day festival, stunt shows, car shows, Rally Car racing, and road running relays.

== Motor Sports ==
An oval race track has been built on one of the arena's car parks, and regularly holds Stock Car Racing organised by Spedeworth. The main arena has been used for rally car racing events such as the Tempest Rally, and also supercar driving experiences.

== The Aldershot Command Searchlight Tattoo ==
The Tattoo originated from a special display for Queen Victoria in 1894 and soon became an event in itself. Its growing popularity required the building of a venue to cater for the large numbers of people attending. Rushmoor Arena was built in 1923 and the Tattoo became a national spectacle with over 5,000 soldiers taking part. The Tattoo had annual crowds of up to 500,000 people, and over 58,000 cars.

Since the 1980s, Road Running Aldershot Farnham and District Athletics Club have staged road relays, including the southern championship, and on a few occasions, the national championship. The relays used 3 km circuits.

== Location ==
Rushmoor Arena is located on the West side of Aldershot off Bourley Road, close to the Wellington Statue. There is space for 10,000 cars near the arena. Aldershot station is a walking distance of about 1.4 miles (2.3 kilometres).

== See also ==
- List of contemporary amphitheatres
