= Charlie Cannon =

- Born: September 11, 1911; San Quintín, Baja California
- Occupations: Singer; theater performer

Charles Albert Cannon (September 11, 1911 – August 14, 2003), a singer, theater performer and co-founder of Starlight Opera in San Diego, California, was born in the coastal town of San Quintín, Baja California, near Ensenada.

== Early years and education ==
Charlie Cannon was just 2½ when he performed for the first time in the lobby of his father's Baja California hotel. While attending San Diego High School, he sang in a boys' quartet and played saxophone in the student band. In the 1930s, he performed vaudeville-type shows in Grossmont High School's auditorium for an El Cajon theater group.

He attended San Diego State College, where he met Art Linkletter, according to the San Diego Union-Tribune, and together they wrote an operetta. Cannon served three-and-a-half years in the U.S. Army during Second World War, and was stationed in the South Pacific.

== Musical career ==
In 1945, Cannon, William Dean, Julius Leib and Robert J. Sullivan founded the San Diego Civic Light Opera Co., which ultimately became the Starlight Theatre in Balboa Park. It moved to its permanent location, in a 4,200-seat bowl, in 1948. During its first season in 1946, Cannon debuted on stage in Gilbert & Sullivan's "Mikado," presented in the San Diego Zoo's Wegeforth Bowl. Next, he starred in The Chocolate Soldier, H.M.S. Pinafore, Naughty Marietta, The Barber of Seville, and Hansel and Gretel.

Cannon performed in musicals and served as choral director for 15 years of stage roles and more than 600 performances until 1961 when he became the company producer. The San Diego Union once wrote, "Charlie Cannon is Starlight Opera's 'big gun.' "

In 1964, he began performing as a piano-bar entertainer at the Red Fox Room, a steak house in San Diego, until 1985. Upon his retirement, he moved with his wife Joy, also a singer and performer at the Starlight Theatre, to Clarkston, Washington.

The Starlight Theatre, ranked one of the oldest continuously producing musical theater companies in the country, closed in 2011 after the theater filed for bankruptcy. The School for Creative Careers has asked the City of San Diego to enter into a new lease agreement once repairs are done on the theater.

== Family ==
Charlie Cannon and his wife Joy (who died in 1999 at age 70), had two children, son Robert Cannon of San Diego and daughter Laura Doan of Manchester, England.
