= Cape Cod Melody Tent =

Tent theater in Hyannis, Massachusetts, US

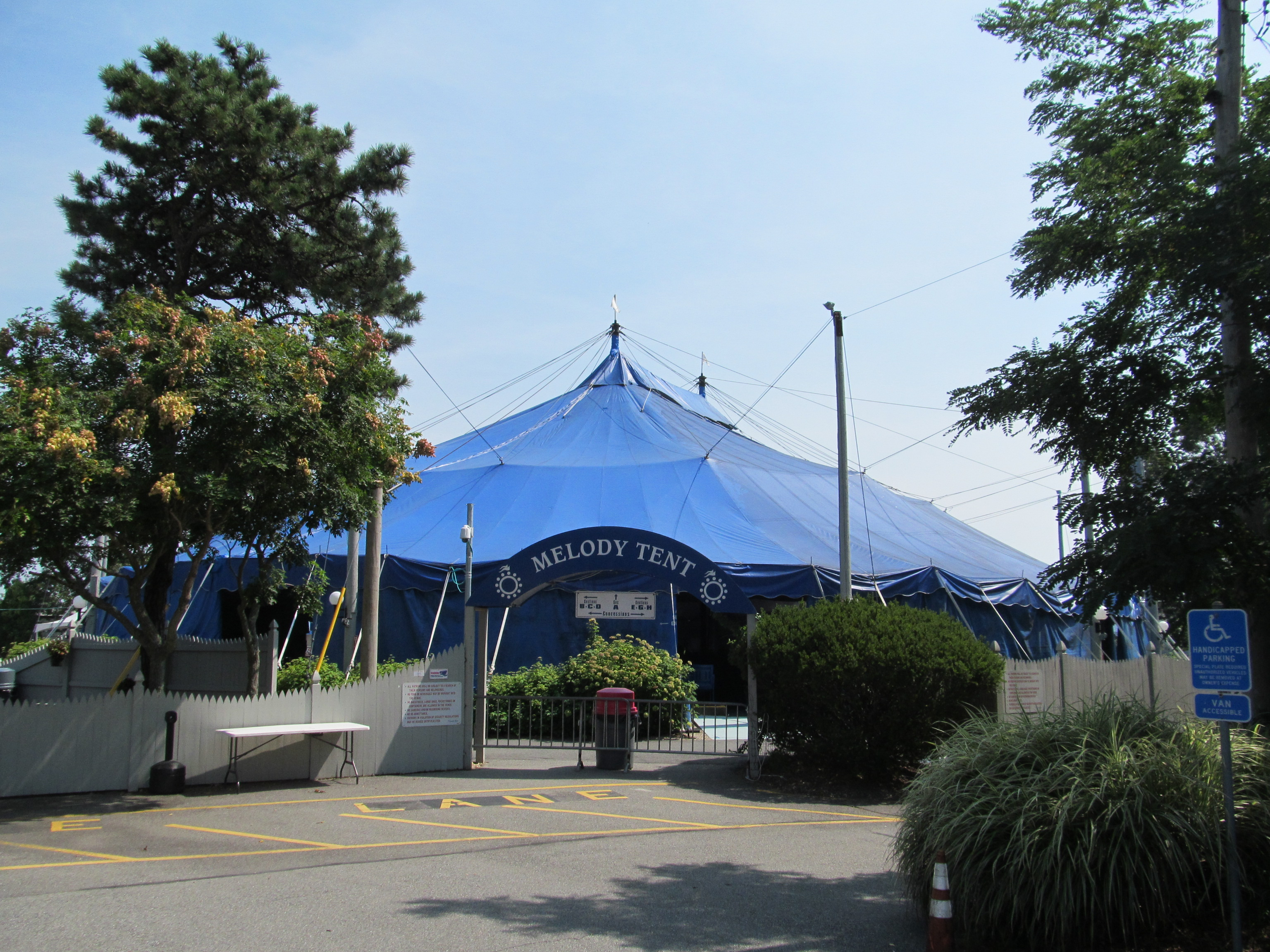
- Cape Cod Melody Tent
- Interactive map of Cape Cod Melody Tent
- Former names: Cape Cod Music Circus
- Location: Hyannis, Massachusetts
- Coordinates: 41°38′49.69″N 70°17′54.24″W
- Owner: South Shore Playhouse Associates
- Seating type: reserved
- Capacity: 2,300
- Type: Outdoor amphitheatre

Construction
- Opened: 1950

Cape Cod Melody Tent is a South Shore Playhouse Associates-owned tent theater located in Hyannis, Massachusetts, in the county of Barnstable. Affiliated with the South Shore Music Circus, these are the only two continuously operated tent theaters in the round in the United States.

== Overview ==
The Cape Cod Melody Tent is a seasonal venue that runs from May through September. The Music Circus and Melody Tent are owned and operated by the South Shore Playhouse Associates, a not-for-profit organization. The seating capacity is approximately 2,300. It was originally known as Cape Cod Music Circus from 1950 to 1951.

David M. Holtzmann, a theatrical attorney who represented actress Gertrude Lawrence, owned both theaters from the late 1950s until his death in 1965, after which they were operated by his widow, Sondra. In March 1990, the South Shore Playhouse Associates purchased the Cape Cod Melody Tent and have since made numerous modern upgrades including a new vinyl tent with Cupola venting system, new seats, new stage and computerized lighting and sound systems.

== See also ==
- List of contemporary amphitheatres
