= Mountain Laurel Center for the Performing Arts =

Performing arts center in Bushkill, Pennsylvania

Coordinates: 41.13790°N 75.02142°W

Poconos Park is a multi-use performing arts center situated at Bushkill in the Pocono Mountains area of Pennsylvania, USA.

The principal venue is the Tom Ridge Pavilion, an Amphitheatre with a covered seating capacity of 2,509. In addition, the lawn has an uncovered seating capacity of 7,500 for a total of up to 10,009 seats.

Poconos Park was formerly known as the Mount Laurel Center for the Performing Arts until 2022. In 2022, the property was purchased and rebranded as Poconos Park.

== History ==
After a series of financial issues since opening in 2003, the center's board dissolved itself in March 2008 and handed the property back to its owner, Wolfington Companies.

After a three-year hiatus, Wolfington and O'Neil Property Group hired The Total Concert Team to manage the 2011 season, and they produced four concerts.

The 2012 season was managed by Christopher Perrotti, and consisted of 10 shows.

The last public concert at the center was August 24, 2012. Since the end of the 2012 season, the facility has been used primarily for community events, including community day and graduation ceremonies for the local high school.
