= Northwest Georgia Amphitheatre =

Concert venue in Ringgold, Georgia, United States of America

- Interactive map of Northwest Georgia Amphitheatre
- Former names: Northwest Georgia Bank Amphitheatre
- Location: 220 Catoosa Circle; Ringgold, Georgia
- Coordinates: 34.937967°N 85.179706°W
- Owner: Catoosa County, Georgia
- Operator: Catoosa County Parks & Recreation Department
- Seating type: Lawn
- Capacity: 3,500
- Type: Outdoor amphitheater

Construction
- Groundbreaking: 2004
- Opened: 2007

Website
- www.nwgaamp.com

The Northwest Georgia Amphitheatre (originally known as the Northwest Georgia Bank Amphitheatre) is an outdoor amphitheater located in Ringgold, Georgia, near Chattanooga, Tennessee. Construction on the venue began in 2004 on land owned by Catoosa County, using $550,000 in funds donated by the Northwest Georgia Bank Foundation. The amphitheater opened in 2007 with a three-day Sunset Concert featuring country artist John Anderson.

== See also ==
- List of contemporary amphitheatres
