= Mountain Lakes Amphitheater =

Outdoor amphitheater in Flatwoods, West Virginia

- Interactive map of Mountain Lakes Amphitheater
- Location: Flatwoods, West Virginia
- Coordinates: 38.69618°N 80.66286°W
- Owner: Skidmore Development
- Seating type: Reserved seating, lawn seating
- Capacity: 1700
- Type: Amphitheatre

Construction
- Opened: May 20, 2006

Website
- Mountain Lakes Amphitheater

Mountain Lakes Amphitheater is an outdoor amphitheater near Flatwoods, West Virginia. Constructed in 2005 and early 2006, the 1700 seat amphitheater is an addition to the growing tourist attractions located at exit 67 on Interstate 79 near Flatwoods, West Virginia.

The Mountain Lakes Amphitheater opened for business on May 20, 2006, with seasoned country artist John Anderson performing the main show and newcomers Taylor Made as the opening act. The rest of the summer continued with concerts featuring Josh Turner, Jeff Bates, Darryl Worley, Michael Combs, The Crabb Family, Phil Dirt & the Dozers, Mike Albert & the Big 'E' Band, Rick K and the All Nighters, Heartcry, Mark Bishop, The Freemans, Nothin' Fancy, The Vaughns, New Ground, Spirits of Bluegrass, 3rd String, Rivers Edge, and Victoria Huggins. The local Colgate Country Showdown was also held at Mountain Lakes Amphitheater in 2006.

The 2007 season kicked off on June 9 with Rhonda Vincent & the Rage, Nothin' Fancy, and Williams & Clark Expedition. Other artists performing on the MLA stage during the 2007 season were Joe Diffie, Bucky Covington, Hope's Call, The Perrys and JP Miller. The venue expanded the season with Home Grown Country Nights, a live radio broadcast on WBRB 101.3 The Bear. Home Grown Country Nights presented unsigned area talent the opportunity to be heard live on the radio, after being juried and selected by WV Radio officials. The local Colgate Country Showdown was held at Mountain Lakes Amphitheater again in 2007.

In 2008, the season kicked off once again with Rhonda Vincent & the Rage and Nothin' Fancy. Home Grown Country Nights was moved to every Friday night this season. Artists Bo Bice, Bucky Covington and Jake Owen all performed at the amphitheater during the season as well as the local Colgate Country Showdown.

Mountain Lake Amphitheaters' season runs from May - Oct. The venue is often used for weddings and conferences in addition to music concerts.
