= The Pavilion at Star Lake =

Amphitheater in Burgettstown, Pennsylvania

Coordinates: 40.4197°N 80.4341°W

- Interactive map of The Pavilion at Star Lake
- Former names: List: Coca-Cola Star Lake Amphitheater (1990–1999); Post-Gazette Pavilion (2000–2009); First Niagara Pavilion (2010–2016); KeyBank Pavilion (2016–2020); S&T Bank Music Park (Jan 2020–Dec 2020)
- Address: 665 State Route 18; Burgettstown, Pennsylvania
- Location: Greater Pittsburgh Region
- Owner: Live Nation
- Capacity: 23,000

Construction
- Groundbreaking: 1989
- Opened: June 17, 1990

The Pavilion at Star Lake, originally Coca-Cola Star Lake Amphitheater, is an outdoor amphitheater near Burgettstown, Pennsylvania, United States, 25 miles (40 km) west of Pittsburgh. The venue holds approximately 23,000 fans: 7,100 in a reserved-seating, open-air pavilion and an additional 16,000 on a general-admission lawn. It is owned and operated by Live Nation.

== Venue history ==
The venue opened as Coca-Cola Star Lake Amphitheater and hosted its first national act, Billy Joel, on June 17, 1990. A second show was added on June 18, 1990 due to the record-breaking response. In 2000, the name of the venue was changed to the Post-Gazette Pavilion after the Pittsburgh Post-Gazette bought the naming rights.

President George W. Bush visited the venue on November 1, 2004 along with Curt Schilling & Lynn Swann.

In February 2010, the Post-Gazette announced it had not renewed its contract for naming rights to the facility. This led First Niagara Bank to snatch up the naming rights, after which the venue was named First Niagara Pavilion. The facility was renamed again in 2016, becoming KeyBank Pavilion after KeyCorp acquired First Niagara. It was renamed S&T Bank Music Park in 2020 upon the expiration of KeyCorp's naming rights deal, but renamed to The Pavilion at Star Lake the following year.

The venue is well known for having traffic control problems, with concerts frequently causing gridlock and leaving attendees stranded for hours after shows begin, sometimes unable to use their tickets.

== Performer history ==
Janet Jackson was scheduled to perform at the amphitheater during her Rhythm Nation World Tour on September 3, 1990, but the show was canceled.

Grateful Dead played the venue twice, on June 22 and 23, 1992).

Depeche Mode performed at the venue on June 29, 1994 during their Exotic Tour/Summer Tour '94.

Metallica played the venue on August 12, 1994 as part of the Summer Sh*t Tour.

INXS played their final concert with former lead vocalist Michael Hutchence on September 27, 1997, less than two months before his death.

Yes and Kansas performed at Starlake on July 5, 2000.

Lynyrd Skynyrd recorded their 1997 live album Lyve From Steel Town at Starlake Amphitheatre.

The British group the Spice Girls performed at the venue, as part of their Spiceworld Tour, on July 15, 1998.

Van Halen recorded a live concert at the venue on July 24, 1998 for a radio station during their III Tour.

Phish recorded their show at the venue on July 29, 2003, later releasing it as a live album entitled LivePhish 07.29.03. They subsequently performed a sold-out show on June 18, 2009, and again on June 23, 2012. They have performed 9 shows at the venue, the first in 1997 and the most recent in 2023. The band's August 11, 1998 performance at the venue was released on the DVD Star Lake '98 in 2012.

Fleetwood Mac were scheduled to perform during their Say You Will Tour on June 10, 2004, but the show was canceled.

Josh Groban performed here in August 2004 during his "Closer" tour, as well as during August 2016 on his summer "Stages"/mix tour with Sarah McLachlan.

Kings of Leon were scheduled to perform during their Come Around Sundown World Tour on September 7, 2010, with The Whigs and The Black Keys as their opening acts, but the show was canceled, due to scheduling conflicts.

Jimmy Buffett & The Coral Reefer Band performed at the venue nearly every year from when it opened in 1990 until 2022. The only exception is when they played PNC Park in 2005 and in 2017. At the July 7, 2018, Son of A Son of A Sailor Tour concert, thousands of ParrotHeads were left waiting to get into the venue for hours.

Nicki Minaj performed for over 19,000 fans at the venue on August 8, 2015 as part of The Pinkprint Tour.

Farm Aid has been played there twice. September 21, 2002, and September 17, 2017.

Lana Del Rey performed at the venue on October 3, 2023.

Dave Matthews Band has performed at Star Lake more times than any other artist, with 32 appearances.

The venue has also played host to music festivals, including All That! Music and More Festival, Crüe Fest, Crüe Fest 2, Family Values Tour, Farm Aid, H.O.R.D.E. Festival, Honda Civic Tour, Identity Festival, Lilith Fair, Lollapalooza, Mayhem Festival, Ozzfest, Projekt Revolution, Uproar Festival, and Vans Warped Tour.

== In popular culture ==
The venue was featured on a 2002 episode of The Daily Show.

In December 2012, Phish released a concert video, Star Lake '98, of their 1998 show at the venue.

Dave Matthews Band released Live Trax Vol. 35 on October 16, 2015, The show was recorded June 20, 2009. In May 2020 DMB also released Live Trax Vol. 51 from their August 10, 2007 show there.

== See also ==
- List of contemporary amphitheatres
- Live Nation
