= FirstBank Amphitheater =

Tennessee open-air music venue

- Interactive map of FirstBank Amphitheater
- Location: 4525 Graystone Quarry Ln; Franklin, Tennessee, United States
- Coordinates: 35.810340°N 86.840156°W
- Operator: Live Nation Entertainment
- Capacity: 7,500

Construction
- Opened: 2021

Website
- firstbankamphitheater.com

FirstBank Amphitheater is an open-air music venue located on the site of a former rock quarry in Franklin, Tennessee. The amphitheater has hosted concerts since 2021, and can accommodate a capacity of 7,500.

== History ==
The quarry at the site of the amphitheater had been used in the 1960s during the construction of I-65, and subsequently abandoned with some 800 tons of faulty cement culverts left behind. In 2014, the land was purchased by husband-and-wife business partners Rick and Nancy McEachern, who reportedly cleared 900 tons of trash from the site over the following year and a half.

The venue opened in 2021 with a benefit concert featuring Florida Georgia Line, Maren Morris, and other country performers, and has since hosted acts such as Zach Bryan, Cody Johnson, Willie Nelson, and Mavis Staples.

== Traffic issues ==
Starting with its first concert, FirstBank Amphitheater has faced major traffic problems before and after events, leading to complaints from both neighbors and concert-goers. In 2022, before the amphitheater's second season, CEO Rick McEachern addressed a Thompson's Station Board of Mayor and Alderman meeting to discuss planned fixes, including additional lanes and improved signage.

Sold-out events at the venue average about 3,000 private cars. As of 2024, there are no public transportation options available.

== See also ==
- List of contemporary amphitheaters
