= Atlantic Union Bank Pavilion =

Outdoor amphitheater in Virginia, U.S.

Coordinates: 36.83069°N 76.29767°W

- Interactive map of Atlantic Union Bank Pavilion
- Former names: nTelos Pavilion (2001-17); Union Bank & Trust Pavilion (2018)
- Address: 16 Crawford Cir; Portsmouth, VA 23704-3862
- Location: Downtown Portsmouth
- Owner: City of Portsmouth
- Operator: Integrated Management Group
- Capacity: 6,500

Construction
- Opened: c. 2001
- Renovated: 2003
- Cost: $13 million

Website
- Venue Website

The Atlantic Union Bank Pavilion (formerly the nTelos Pavilion and Union Bank & Trust Pavilion) is an outdoor amphitheater in Portsmouth, Virginia, United States.

The venue produces and presents a broad spectrum of concerts and events which connect the audiences and help new generation of listeners discover music and live performance. The venue invites audiences and artists to celebrate live music, the power of community, and Pavilion. The covered outdoor Pavilion is located on the banks of the Elizabeth River in downtown Portsmouth, Virginia and provides live entertainment experiences in the Hampton Roads area.

It has a capacity of 6,500 people and is located directly across the Elizabeth River from downtown Norfolk.

== See also ==
- List of contemporary amphitheatres
