= Starlight Bowl (Burbank, California) =

- Interactive map of Starlight Bowl
- Address: 1249 Lockheed View Dr.
- Location: Burbank, California
- Coordinates: 34.206412°N 118.310131°W
- Owner: City of Burbank
- Capacity: 3,800
- Type: Amphitheater

Construction
- Opened: 1950

Website
- www.starlightbowl.com

The Starlight Bowl is an amphitheatre located in Burbank, California. Designed by E. Dean Cowley, it was built in 1950 and dedicated on June 17, 1951 at the cost of $175,000. Originally, it sat 2,500 people. Contemporarily it seats 2,800 in chairback seating and 1,000 more on the lawn for a total capacity of 3,800.

== See also ==
- List of contemporary amphitheatres
