= Synovus Bank Amphitheater =

Music venue in Atlanta, Georgia

Pinnacle Amphitheater at Chastain Park
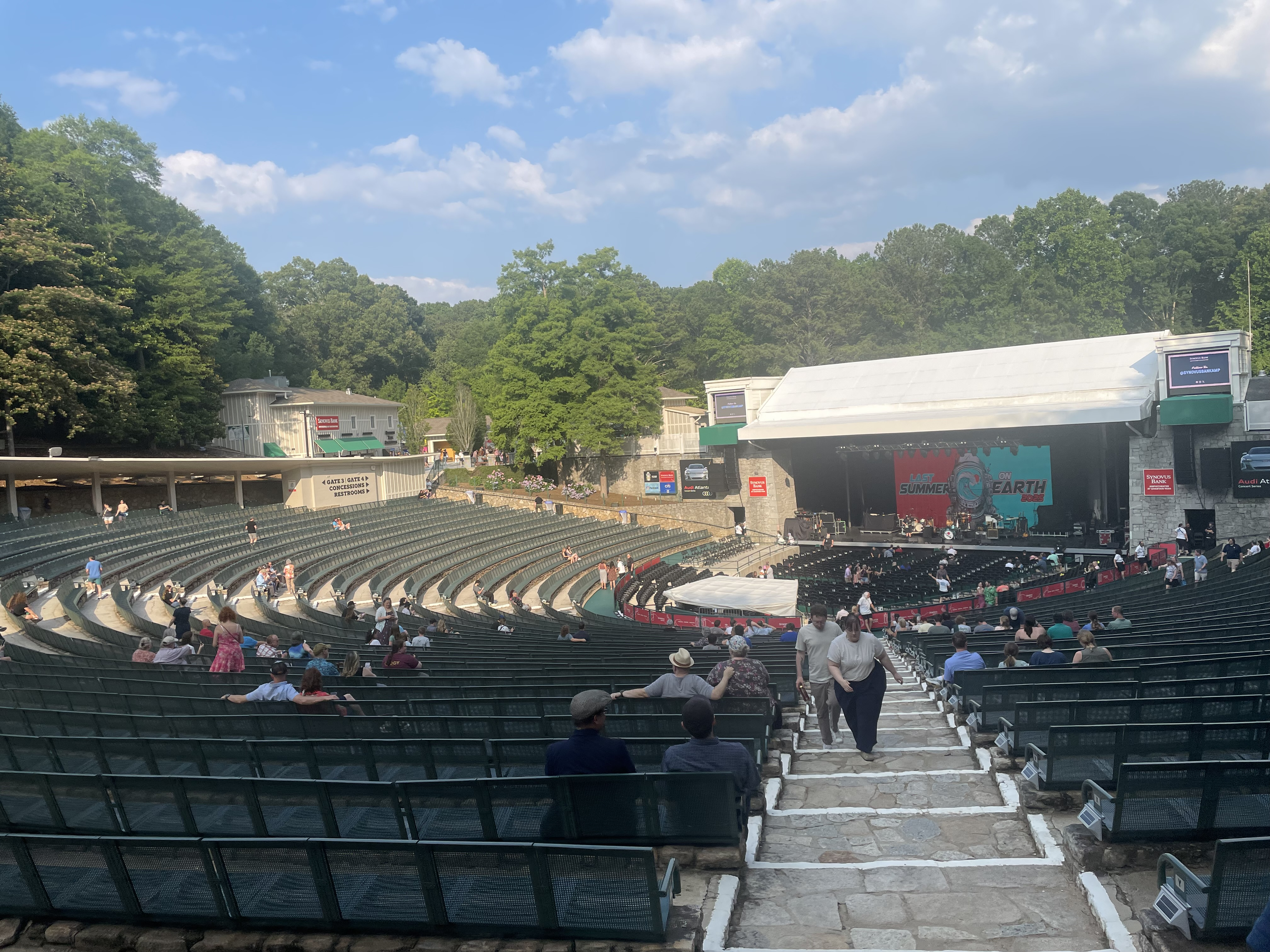
- Venue in 2025
- Interactive map of Pinnacle Amphitheater at Chastain Park
- Full name: Pinnacle Amphitheater at Chastain Park
- Former names: North Fulton Park Amphitheater (1944-46); Chastain Park Amphitheater (1946-2007); Delta Classic Chastain Park Amphitheater (2007-18); State Bank Amphitheatre (2018-19); Cadence Bank Amphitheatre (2019-25); Synovus Bank Amphitheater (2025-26)
- Address: 4469 Stella Dr NW; Atlanta, GA 30327
- Location: Chastain Park, Buckhead, Fulton County
- Coordinates: 33.876969°N 84.396948°W
- Owner: City of Atlanta
- Capacity: 6,900

Construction
- Groundbreaking: 1942
- Opened: June 20, 1944
- Renovated: 1984, 1991, 1998, 2004, 2017-18
- Cost: $100,000 ($1.97 million in 2025 dollars)

Website
- pinnacleampatchastainpark.com

Pinnacle Amphitheater at Chastain Park (originally known as North Fulton Park Amphitheatre; formerly the Cadence Bank Amphitheatre the Chastain Park Amphitheater, and Synovus Bank Amphitheater) is an outdoor amphitheatre within historic Chastain Park in Atlanta, Georgia. The venue, designed by Nelson Brackin, opened in 1944 and is decreed "Atlanta’s Oldest Outdoor Music Venue". The venue attracts more than 200,000 spectators per season.

== History ==
With the development of the North Fulton Park underway, Fulton County Commissioner Troy Green Chastain wanted to include an outdoor music venue alongside the other amenities of the park. Due to its last-minute addition, original plans saw outdoor bleacher-style seating with a stage and bandshell. Chastain sent scouts to Richmond, Pittsburgh, Daytona Beach, Louisville, and Chicago. The venue was modeled after amphitheatre at Byrd Park in Richmond. Construction began in 1942 and was completed in 1944. The venue opened on June 20, 1944, as the "North Fulton Park Amphitheater".

The amphitheater got off to a slow start, mainly due to the effects of World War II and no promotion of events. Chastain died in 1946, with the venue and park being renamed in his honor. In 1952, the city of Atlanta gained ownership of the venue. The city began offering free concerts for the Atlanta Pops Orchestra, and a year later, an opera series that ran until 1968. At the time, the venue drew more than 30,000 spectators per year. In 1973, the Atlanta Symphony Orchestra began its yearly concert series at the venue. During the first concert series, the ASO was conducted by celebrity bandleaders including Frankie Laine, Richard Hayman, Henry Mancini, Marvin Hamlisch and Peter Nero.

The venue went through renovations in 1984, 1998 and 2004. The most notable renovation was completed by architect Nelson Brackin. Brackin was asked to design the renovation of the 6,000 seat amphitheatre in a fast-track approach lasting only a few short months. This renovation including new additions such as new box offices, concession stands in a plaza, restroom expansions, as well as staff/performer spaces like a green room, commissary, kitchen and an office for business.

In 2007, the venue began a sponsorship with Delta Air Lines known as the Delta Classic Chastain Park Amphitheater. In March 2018, the Georgia-based State Bank & Trust Company secured naming rights for the venue. The name change took effect April 2, 2018. In January 2019, the State Bank & Trust Company merged with fellow Georgia bank, Cadence Bank. Later in February, Live Nation announced the amphitheatre would take on the sponsored name of Cadence Bank in accordance with the merger. The name change officially took place on March 1, 2019.

The venue was renamed the Synovus Bank Amphitheater on March 6, 2025.

Following Synovus Bank’s merger with Pinnacle Financial Partners, the venue will be known as Pinnacle Amphitheater at Chastain Park beginning with the 2027 season.

== About the venue ==
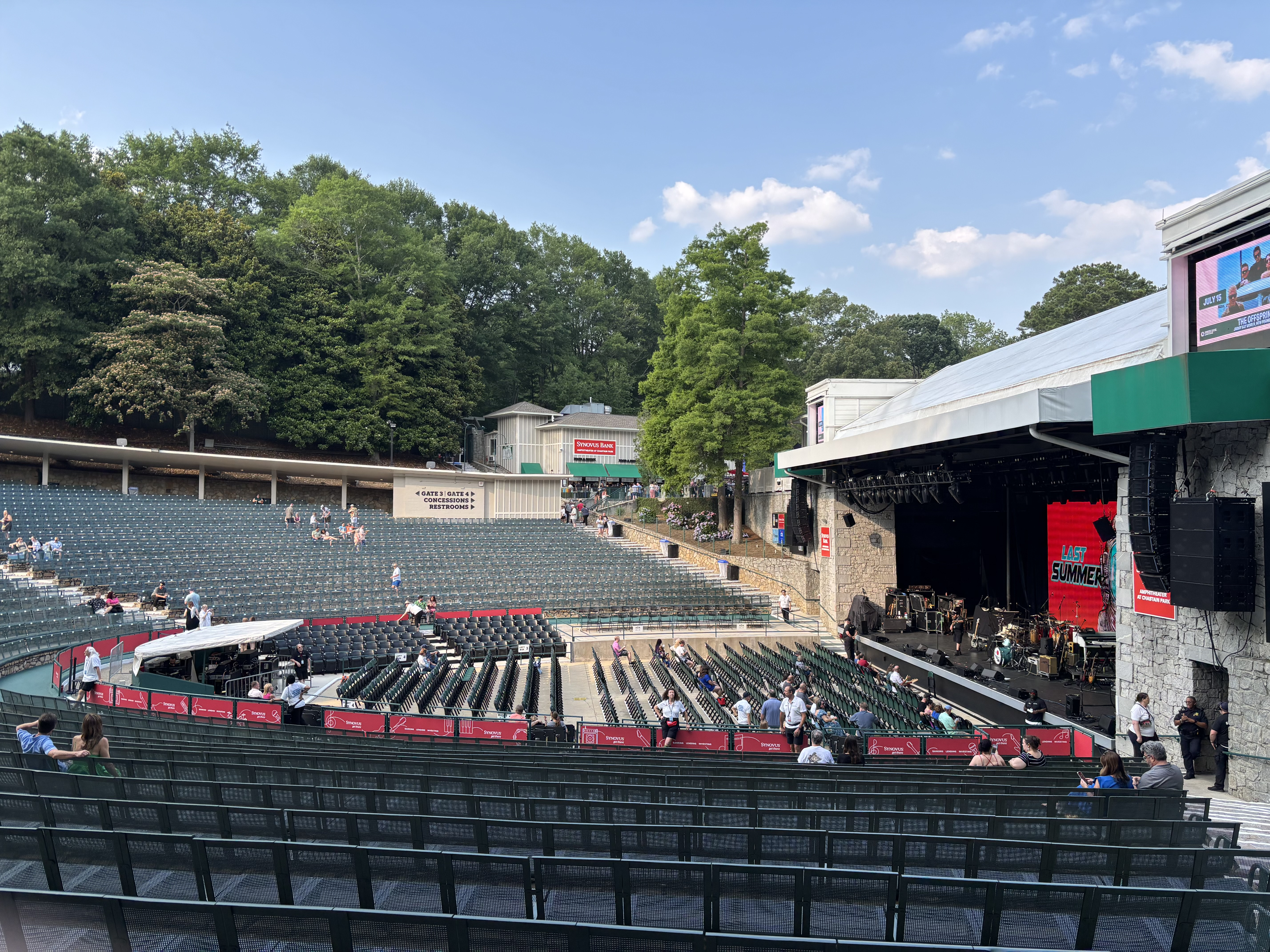
Synovus Bank Amphitheater, 2025

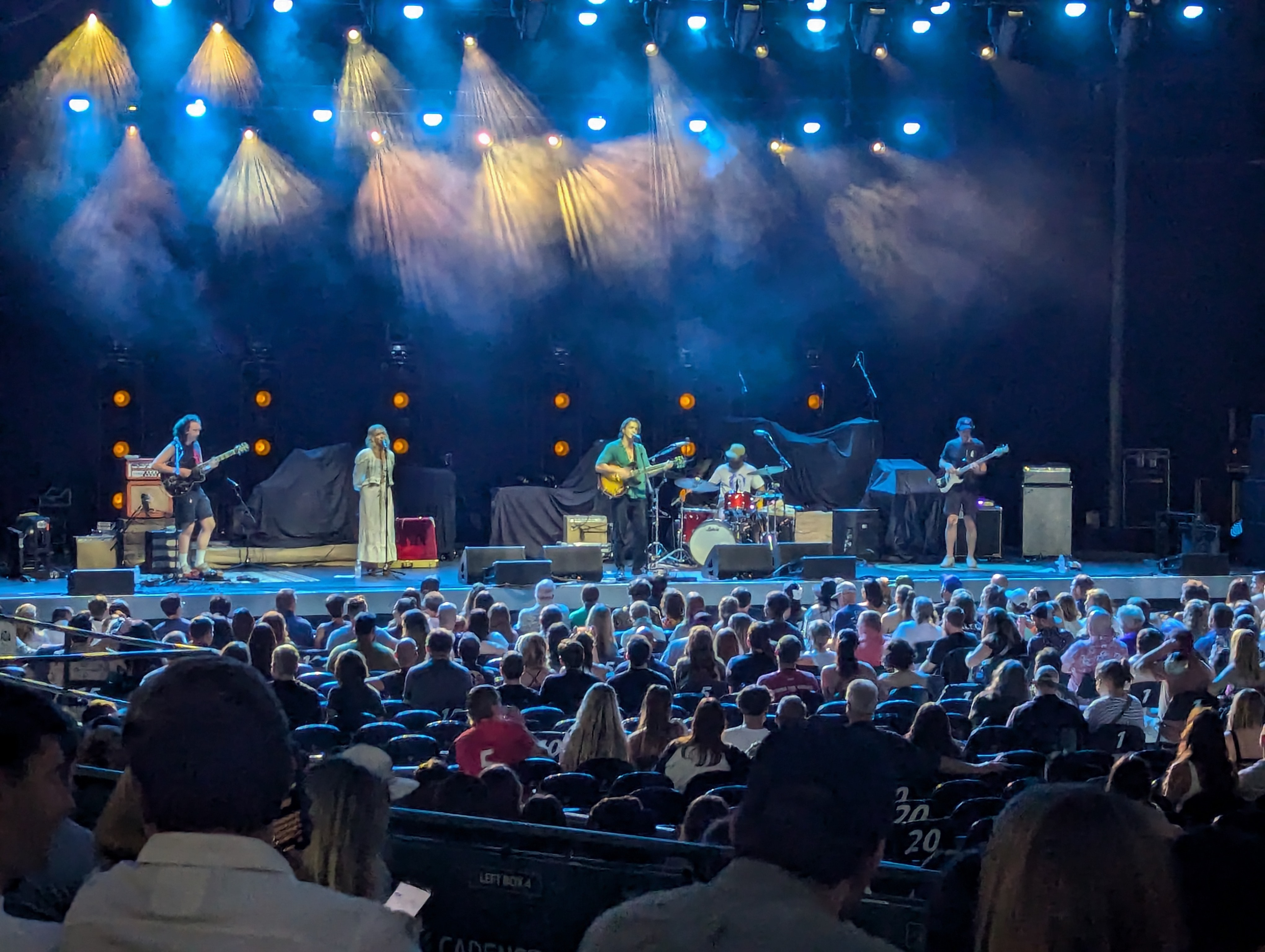
Chance Peña performing at the Cadence Bank Amphitheatre, 2024

The outdoor amphitheater operates only during the summer months. While during most years there are shows between April and October, the majority fall between the end of May and early September. The two main promoters of concerts are the Atlanta Symphony Orchestra and Live Nation. The capacity is roughly 6,900, with the vast majority of tickets being reserved seating. There is also limited general admission lawn seating at the back of the amphitheater and at stage right. Only a small number of seats are covered.

For all but a few shows a season, tables are set up in the pit and lower part of the orchestra section. Tables seat six, and all six tickets must be purchased together. Those who do not purchase table seats are allowed to bring in tray-sized tables. Also for the table setup shows, food and drinks, including alcohol, are allowed to be brought in for consumption. Elaborate setups with nice food, tablecloths and candles are common. However, there are a small number of shows each season with a "rock" setup. Here there are no tables or carry-ins. Instead of tables in the pit, only rows of chairs are set up. Parking is limited, and traffic can be heavy on nights when the show is sold out.

The amphitheater was once the venue for "Theatre Under the Stars," a summer season of Broadway musicals and/or comedies which always featured a well-known actor as its star. In 1968, after moving into the then-new Atlanta Civic Center, "Theatre Under the Stars" became "Theatre Of the Stars." In the 1980s, "Theatre Of the Stars" moved into the Fox Theatre, and in 2013, the project announced that it was closing after 60 years.
