= Mud Island Amphitheater =

Outdoor amphitheater in Memphis, Tennessee

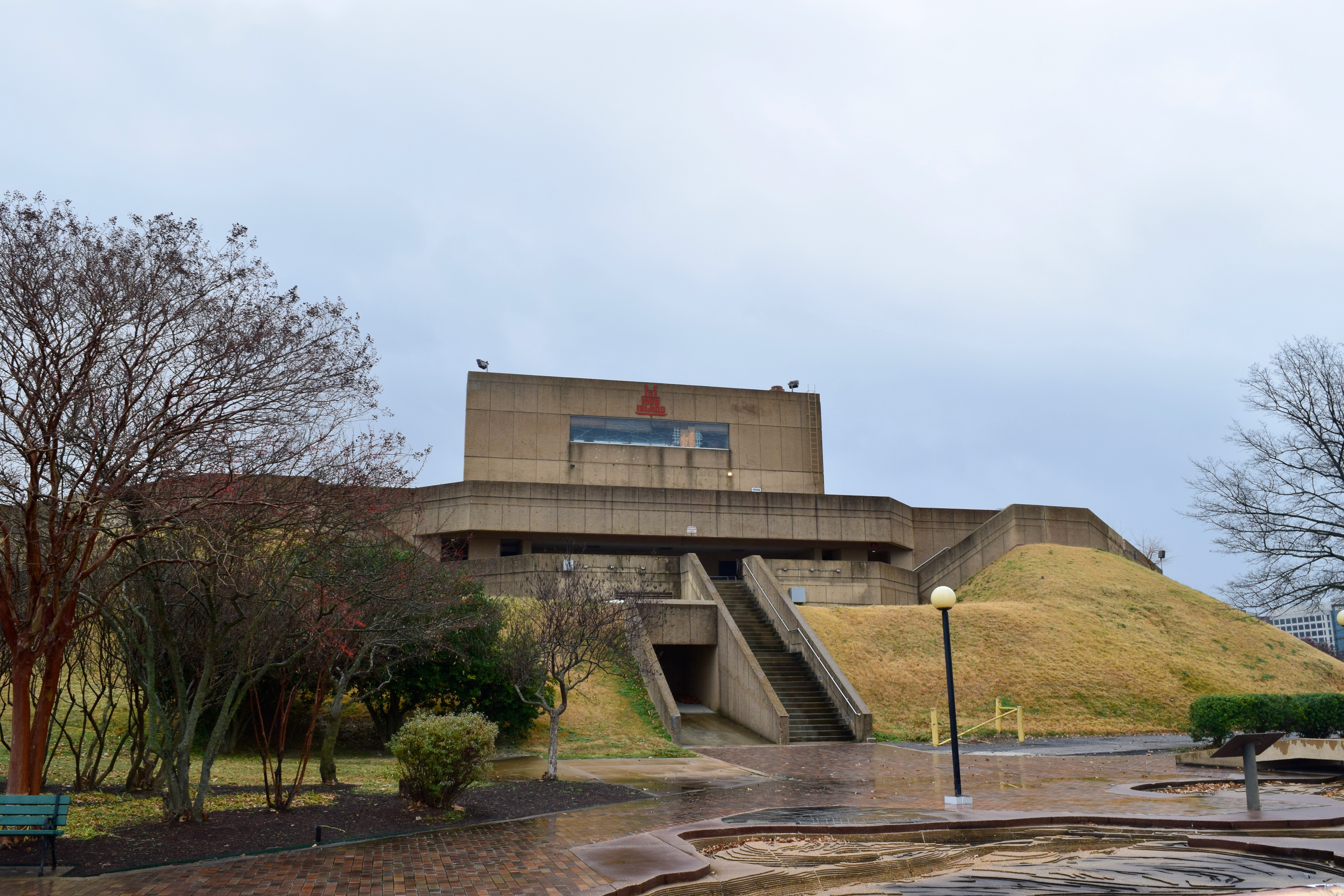
- The rear of the amphitheater
- Interactive map of Mud Island Amphitheater
- Address: Mud Island, Memphis, Tennessee
- Location: Memphis, Tennessee, U.S.
- Coordinates: 35.14790°N 90.05878°W
- Capacity: 5,000
- Type: Outdoor amphitheater

Construction
- Opened: 1982

Website
- www.mudislandamphitheater.com

Mud Island Amphitheater is a 5,000-seat concrete outdoor amphitheater located on Mud Island, a peninsula in Memphis, Tennessee. The structure has been used for concerts and shows since it was built in 1982. A few artists that have performed at Mud Island Amphitheater include Bob Dylan, Journey, Kelly Clarkson, Heart, Peter Frampton, Britney Spears, and Phish.
