= Starlight Bowl (San Diego) =

Coordinates: 32.726408°N 117.153504°W

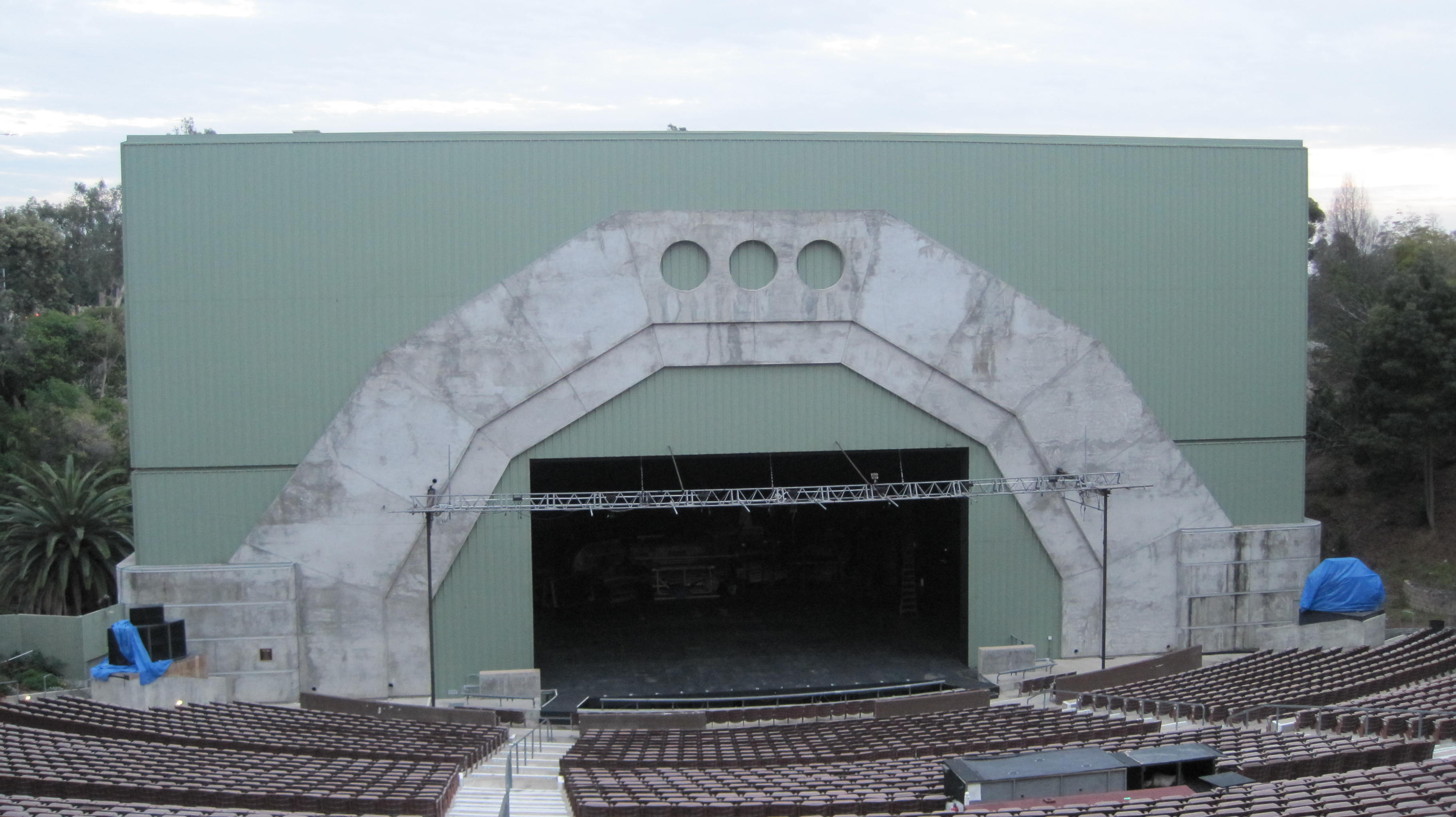
- The amphitheater in 2009
- Interactive map of Starlight Bowl
- Address: Balboa Park
- Location: San Diego, California, U.S.
- Owner: City of San Diego
- Operator: Formerly San Diego Civic Light Opera
- Capacity: 4,300
- Type: Amphitheater
- Events: Live theater, concerts, cultural events

Construction
- Built: 1935
- Opened: 1935
- Architect: California Pacific International Exposition project

Website
- www.savestarlight.org

This is a photo of the entrance to the amphitheater.

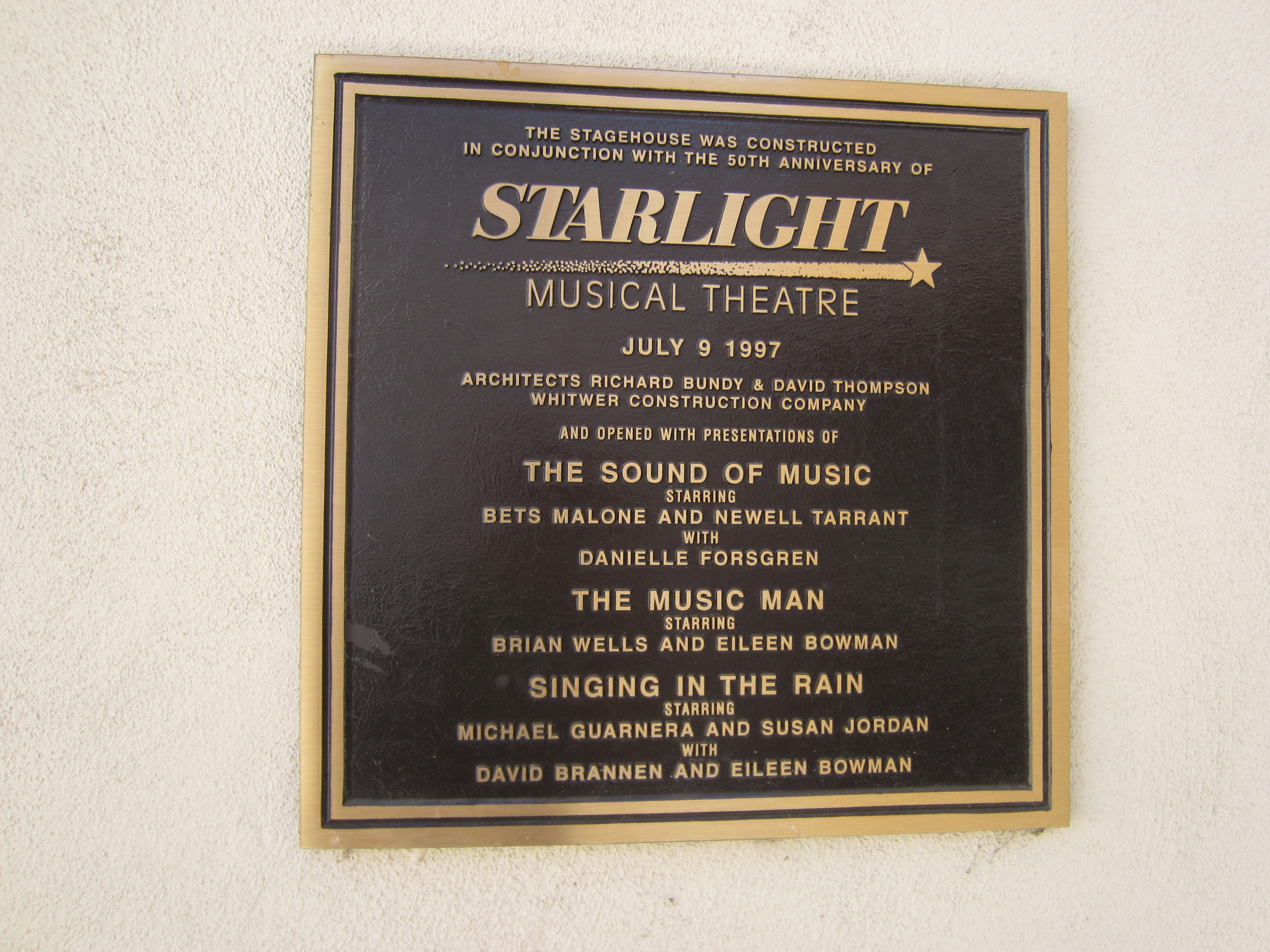
plaque

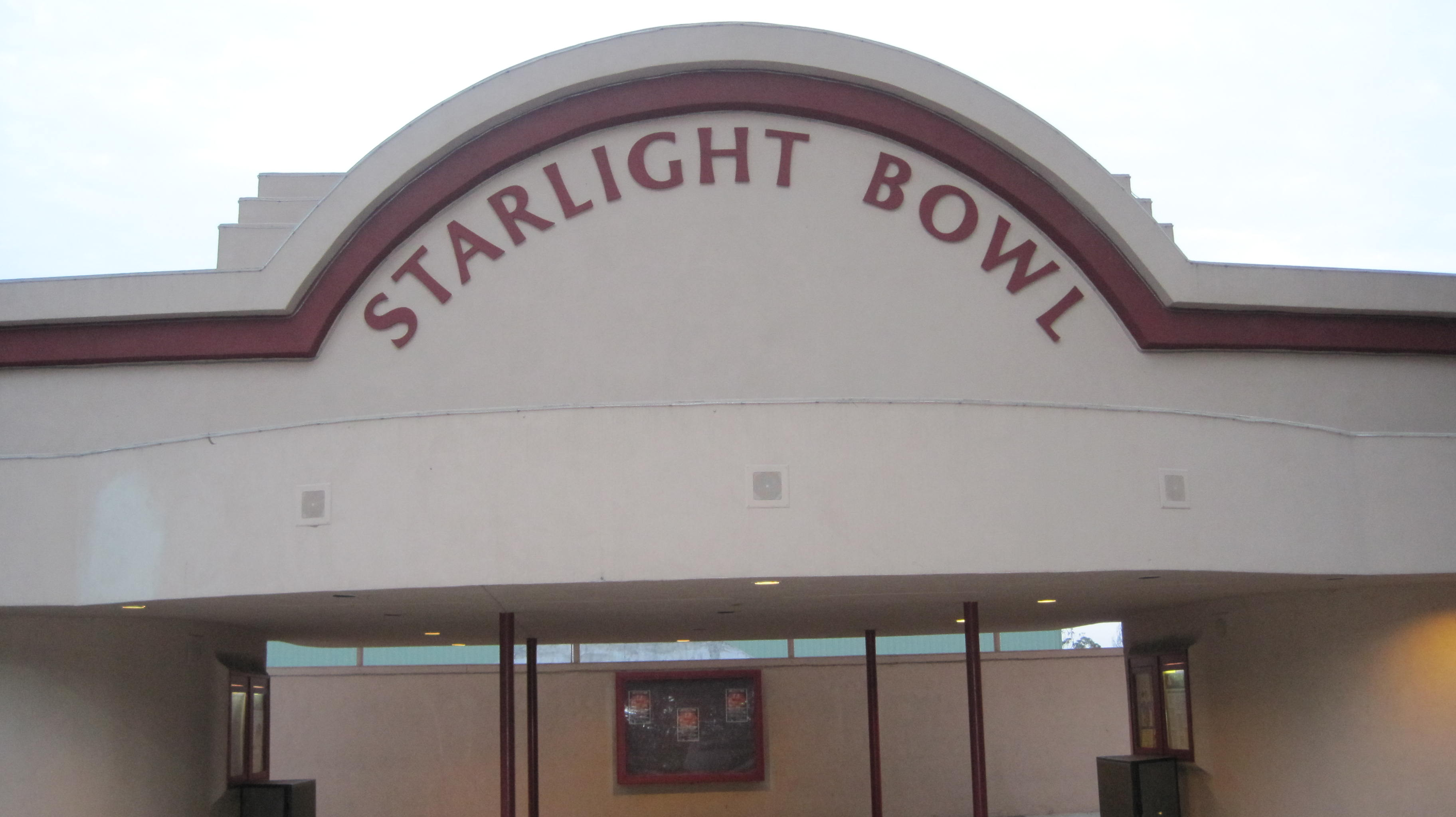

The Starlight Bowl is an amphitheater in Balboa Park in San Diego, California. It was constructed for the 1935–1936 California Pacific International Exposition and seats 4,300. It was originally named the Ford Bowl, as Ford Motor Company sponsored outdoor concerts at the venue during the exposition by the Mormon Tabernacle Choir, the San Francisco Symphony, and other performers.

This article is about a plan by the balboa park team and starlight to fix up and revive the Starlight Bowl Amphitheater. They have raised half a million dollars and have plans, but they face some issues to begin construction. The building has been closed for 16 years and is decaying. I need lots of remodeling and investing from the San Diego Council.

== Civic Light Opera ==
Until 2011 Starlight Bowl was the outdoor home of the San Diego Civic Light Opera, also called Starlight Musical Theatre, which presented several Broadway musicals each summer. The Civic Light Opera company was founded in 1945. It was one of the oldest musical theatre companies in the United States.

The amphitheater sits almost directly under the landing path for San Diego International Airport. During musical performances the conductor had a set of lights that indicated the noise level from passing planes. When the noise reached a certain level the conductor signaled everyone to pause, and the musicians and performers froze in place until the plane passed.

The San Diego Civic Light Opera struggled financially in recent years. In 2011 (which would have been the company's 65th season) no productions were mounted, and in August the company filed for Chapter 11 bankruptcy. In 2012 there were no productions, and the company's website was still live but was only advertising shows at other venues. As of 2016 the company's email no longer works and its Facebook page has been removed. The unused Starlight Bowl theater is falling into disrepair and has been described as an "attractive nuisance".

In October 2019, a group of thieves broke into the amphitheater and stole items such as signed guitars and computer equipment valued at $28,000.

== Notable actors ==
- Thelma Camacho
- Charlie Cannon
- Johnny Downs
- David Oliver
- Aspen Vincent

== Save Starlight ==
A non-profit called Save Starlight was founded in 2016 to restore the bowl. Their mission is to restore the bowl as a new platform for a multi media, multi cultural event space.

== See also ==
- List of contemporary amphitheatres
- Culture of San Diego
