= L. B. Day Amphitheatre =

Outdoor concert venue in Salem, Oregon

- Interactive map of L. B. Day Amphitheatre
- Former names: L. B. Day Amphitheatre (1987-2007)
- Location: Salem, Oregon
- Coordinates: 44.958°N 123.0092°W
- Capacity: 14,000
- Type: Outdoor amphitheatre

Construction
- Opened: 1987
- Expanded: 1991

The L. B. Day Amphitheatre (formerly the L. B. Day Comcast Amphitheatre) is an outdoor concert venue in Salem, Oregon, United States, within the Oregon State Fairgrounds. It was completed in 1987 with 9,000 seats, and named for L. B. Day, an Oregon State Senator and longtime supporter of the State Fair. In 1991, the venue was expanded to 14,000 seats to make it the largest arena of its type in Oregon at that time. The amphitheatre serves as the main stage when the State Fair is held in late August through Labor Day, and also hosts concerts at other times of the year. Bands and performers that have played at the venue include ZZ Top, Lynyrd Skynyrd, Cinderella, Queensrÿche, Heart, Ted Nugent, Charley Pride, and Ricky Skaggs. In 2005, the Oregon State Fair chose not to book national acts on the amphitheatre stage. Since 2013 major national acts have returned to the L. B. Day Amphitheatre.

== See also ==
- List of contemporary amphitheatres
