= Ford Amphitheater (Colorado Springs, Colorado) =

Concert venue in Colorado Springs, Colorado

- Interactive map of Ford Amphitheater
- Full name: Ford Amphitheater
- Former names: The Sunset Amphitheater
- Address: 95 Spectrum Loop; Colorado Springs, Colorado; United States
- Coordinates: 39.0183°N 104.8234°W
- Owner: JW Roth
- Operator: Venu
- Capacity: 8,000
- Executive suites: 90

Construction
- Groundbreaking: July 12, 2023
- Built: July 2023-August 2024
- Opened: 9 August 2024 (Soft opening took place on August 6, 2024)
- Cost: $90 million

Website
- www.fordamphitheater.live

Ford Amphitheater, formerly the Sunset Amphitheater, is an 8,000 person capacity open-air concert venue in Colorado Springs, Colorado. It opened in August 2024.

== History ==
While Colorado Springs had a vibrant local music scene, attending "big, epic concerts" generally required music fans to travel to Denver. The Ford was designed as a prototype for similar venues in mid-sized cities that major touring artists would otherwise skip, A long-term project for J.W. Roth, the founder and CEO of the hospitality and entertainment company Venu -- previously Notes Live -- the groundbreaking took place in July 2023. It was known as the Sunset Amphitheater while under construction and renamed in June 2024, when Ford bought the naming rights.

A soft opening with performances from School of Rock, the Colorado Springs Philharmonic, and Phil Vassar took place on August 6, 2024. It officially opened with three sold-out shows by OneRepublic from August 9 to August 11.
