= List of Mayhem Festival lineups by year =

The Mayhem Festival was a touring summer music and extreme sports festival that toured annually from 2008 to 2015. The festival will be returning as a one-off festival in October of 2024 and will return as a full touring festival in 2025. The following is a partial list of bands that performed on the festival since its inception to end.

Band	2008	2009	2010	2011	2012	2013	2014	2015	2024
3 Inches of Blood			✓						
36 Crazyfists	✓								
57 Heavy				✓					
6 Ounce Gloves	✓								
Adakain		✓							
After the Burial									✓
Airbourne	✓								
All Shall Perish				✓					
All That Remains		✓							
Amon Amarth						✓			
Anthrax					✓				
Architects									✓
Art of Destruction			✓						
As I Lay Dying					✓				
Ascend Through the Depths		✓	✓						
Asking Alexandria					✓		✓		
The Athiarchists	✓		✓	✓					
Atreyu			✓						
Attika 7						✓			
August Burns Red									✓
The Autumn Offering	✓								
Avenged Sevenfold			✓				✓		
The Averist							✓		
Back from Ashes				✓	✓				
Bad Omens									✓
A Balance of Power			✓	✓	✓				
Battlecross						✓			
Behemoth		✓							
Betraying the Martyrs					✓				
Beyond the Scar	✓	✓	✓	✓					
Billy Talent				✓					
Black Tide	✓								
The Black Dahlia Murder		✓							
Body Count							✓		
Born of Osiris						✓			✓
Brotherhood			✓						
Brutus									✓
Bullet For My Valentine		✓							
Burial Mound						✓			
Buried Electric						✓			
Butcher Babies						✓			
Cannibal Corpse		✓					✓		
Catalysis			✓	✓					
Children of Bodom						✓			
Chimaira			✓						
City in the Sea						✓			
Code Orange								✓	
Colossick	✓								
Continent of Ash	✓	✓							
Conquest	✓								
Corrupt Absolute		✓							
Darkest Hour							✓		✓
Dead Broke	✓								
Dead Season				✓					
Depths of Mariana					✓	✓			
The Destro	✓								
Dethklok				✓					
The Devil Wears Prada					✓			✓	
Dirge Within		✓							
Dirtfedd					✓				
Disturbed	✓			✓					
Dr. Acula				✓					
DragonForce	✓								
Drown Mary	✓		✓	✓	✓				
Emmure						✓	✓		
Epoxy	✓								
Erimha							✓		
Escuala Grind									✓
Extractus						✓			
Eve of an End			✓						
Feed Her to the Sharks								✓	
Five Finger Death Punch	✓		✓			✓			
God Forbid		✓							
Godsmack				✓					
Gollum		✓	✓	✓					
Hanabie.									✓
Hatebreed			✓	✓					
Hell Within				✓					
Hellyeah								✓	
Hemlock	✓	✓	✓						
His Name Was Yesterday			✓						
Holy Wars									✓
Hostility			✓						
Huntress						✓			
I the Breather					✓				
Iconocaust					✓				
Ill Niño							✓		
In Flames				✓					
In This Moment			✓						
Islander							✓		
It Dies Today									✓
Jinjer									✓
Job for a Cowboy		✓				✓			
Jungle Rot								✓	
Karin Comes Killing					✓				
Killswitch Engage		✓							
King 810							✓		
King Diamond								✓	
Kingdom of Sorrow	✓			✓					
Kissing Candice								✓	
Kittie									✓
Know Lyfe		✓							
Korn			✓				✓		
Lamb of God			✓						
Let The River Swell						✓			
Lions Amongst Wolves						✓			
Lost Chapter		✓		✓					
Madlife		✓							
Machine Head	✓			✓		✓			
Marilyn Manson		✓							
Mastodon	✓					✓			
Megadeth				✓					
Miss May I							✓		
Mobile Deathcamp		✓	✓	✓					
Mothica									✓
Motionless in White						✓			
Motörhead					✓				
Mower	✓								
Mushroomhead		✓					✓		
Must Not Kill		✓	✓	✓					
Negative 263		✓							
Norma Jean			✓						
Northwest Royale		✓							
Parc Jean Drapeau				✓					
Parkway Drive									✓
Peyton Parrish									✓
Poppy									✓
Powderburn	✓			✓					
Property		✓							
Prosper or Perish						✓			
Psychostick	✓		✓	✓					
The Razorblade Dolls						✓			
The Red Chord	✓								
Ray Street Park	✓								
Red Fang				✓					
Rob Zombie			✓			✓			
Roman Candle									✓
Saint Diablo		✓	✓	✓					
Sangre			✓		✓				
Scorpion Child						✓			
Seasons After		✓							
Seven Year Existence				✓					
Seven Hours After Violet									✓
Shadows Fall			✓						
Shattered Sun								✓	
Shores Of Acheron						✓			
Sixx	✓								
Silvertung				✓					
Sister Sin								✓	
Skinlab		✓							
Slayer		✓			✓			✓	
Slipknot	✓				✓				
SOiL	✓		✓						
Soul Made Visible		✓							
Spiral Fracture					✓				
Stemm	✓	✓	✓						
Stigmurder	✓								
Straight Line Stitch				✓					
Stuck in Kaos	✓								
The Surface				✓					
Suicide Silence	✓			✓			✓		✓
Swingshot		✓							
Switchpin	✓	✓		✓					
Sworn In								✓	
Tension Head			✓	✓					
Testament				✓					
Texas Hippie Coalition				✓			✓		
Throwdown									✓
Thrown Into Exile					✓	✓			
Thy Art Is Murder								✓	
Toothgrinder						✓			
Trivium		✓		✓			✓		
Unbroken	✓								
Uncrowned				✓					
Underoath	✓								
Unearth				✓					✓
Until Chaos				✓					
Upon a Burning Body			✓		✓		✓		
Valdur				✓					
Veil of Maya							✓		
Vengince	✓		✓		✓				
Waiting for Never			✓						
Walls of Jericho	✓								
We Came as Romans									✓
Whitechapel		✓			✓			✓	
Winds Of Plague			✓						
Wretched							✓		
Xfactor1		✓	✓						
