= Nobody Safe Tour =

2017 concert tour by Future

- Continental tour by Future
- Location: North America
- Associated album: FUTURE
- Start date: May 4, 2017
- End date: June 30, 2017
- Legs: 1
- No. of shows: 37 in North America; 37 total

Future concert chronology
- Summer Sixteen Tour (2016); Nobody Safe Tour (2017); Future Hndrxx Tour (2017)

The Nobody Safe Tour was a headlining concert tour by American rapper, Future, in support of his eponymous album (2017). The tour began in Memphis on May 4, 2017, and concluded in Las Vegas on June 30, 2017.

== Background ==
On February 14, 2017, the rapper teased his eponymous album set for release on February 17, 2017. With the teaser was also an announcement of a spring tour. Migos, Tory Lanez, Kodak Black, Young Thug, and ASAP Ferg were announced as opening acts for tour. It wasn't until Kodak Black was guilty of five counts of house arrest stipulation which caused him to be removed from the lineup. Zoey Dollaz replaced Kodak Black and A Boogie wit da Hoodie opened in select dates.

== Tour dates ==
List of concerts, showing date, city, country, venue, opening acts, tickets sold, number of available tickets and amount of gross revenue
Date	City	Country	Venue	Opening acts	Attendance	Revenue
North America
May 4, 2017	Memphis	United States	FedExForum	Migos; Tory Lanez; ASAP Ferg; Zoey Dollaz	7,830 / 10,161	$405,570
May 5, 2017	Atlanta	United States	Lakewood Amphitheatre	Young Thug; Zoey Dollaz	34,241 / 37,890 (Note: The score data is combined from the shows held at Lakewood Amphitheatre from May 5 & 9, 2017 respectively.)	$952,349
May 6, 2017	New Orleans	United States	Bold Sphere Music at Champions Square	ASAP Ferg; Zoey Dollaz	6,648 / 7,300	$316,286
May 9, 2017	Atlanta	United States	Lakewood Amphitheatre	Young Thug; Tory Lanez; Zoey Dollaz		
May 11, 2017	Bristow	United States	Jiffy Lube Live	Migos; Tory Lanez; ASAP Ferg; Zoey Dollaz	21,699 / 22,583	$754,228
May 12, 2017	Camden	United States	BB&T Pavilion	Migos; Tory Lanez; ASAP Ferg; Zoey Dollaz	23,828 / 24,877	$665,409
May 13, 2017	Raleigh	United States	Coastal Credit Union Music Park	Migos; Tory Lanez; ASAP Ferg; Zoey Dollaz	19,433 / 19,980	$541,522
May 14, 2017	Charlotte	United States	PNC Music Pavilion	Migos; Tory Lanez; ASAP Ferg; Zoey Dollaz	17,808 / 18,746	$589,897
May 16, 2017 (Note: The concert of May 16, 2017 in Toronto was originally planned to take place at Budweiser Stage, but was relocated to the Air Canada Centre due to rising lake levels at Lake Ontario)	Toronto	Canada	Air Canada Centre	Migos; Tory Lanez; ASAP Ferg; Zoey Dollaz	12,452 / 12,452	$573,054
May 18, 2017	Holmdel	United States	PNC Bank Arts Center	Young Thug; Tory Lanez; ASAP Ferg; Zoey Dollaz	16,327 / 16,934	$481,371
May 19, 2017	Brooklyn	United States	Barclays Center	Migos; Tory Lanez; Zoey Dollaz	13,963 / 13,963	$1,333,094
May 20, 2017	Hartford	United States	Xfinity Theatre	Young Thug; ASAP Ferg; Zoey Dollaz	23,032 / 24,095	$619,507
May 23, 2017	Mansfield	United States	Xfinity Center	Migos; Tory Lanez; ASAP Ferg; Zoey Dollaz	19,424 / 19,900	$645,789
May 24, 2017	Darien	United States	Darien Lake Performing Arts Center	Migos; Tory Lanez; ASAP Ferg; Zoey Dollaz	20,107 / 21,722	$527,295
May 25, 2017	Burgettstown	United States	KeyBank Pavilion	Migos; Tory Lanez; ASAP Ferg; Zoey Dollaz	19,112 / 22,833	$401,806
May 27, 2017	Cuyahoga Falls	United States	Blossom Music Center	Migos; Tory Lanez; ASAP Ferg; Zoey Dollaz	19,841 / 20,826	$608,644
May 28, 2017	Clarkston	United States	DTE Energy Music Theatre	Young Thug; ASAP Ferg; A Boogie wit da Hoodie; Zoey Dollaz	14,583 / 15,190	$515,094
May 31, 2017	Cincinnati	United States	Riverbend Music Center	Migos; Tory Lanez; ASAP Ferg; Zoey Dollaz	19,610 / 20,248	$505,289
June 1, 2017	Maryland Heights	United States	Hollywood Casino Amphitheatre; Maryland Heights	Migos; Tory Lanez; ASAP Ferg; Zoey Dollaz	18,436 / 20,000	$444,972
June 2, 2017	Tinley Park	United States	Hollywood Casino Amphitheatre; Tinley Park	Migos; Tory Lanez; ASAP Ferg; Zoey Dollaz	27,717 / 28,905	$910,959
June 3, 2017	Noblesville	United States	Klipsch Music Center	Migos; Tory Lanez; Zoey Dollaz	—	—
June 4, 2017	Kansas City	United States	Sprint Center	Migos; Tory Lanez; ASAP Ferg; Zoey Dollaz	—	—
June 7, 2017	Edmonton	Canada	Rogers Place	Migos; Tory Lanez; ASAP Ferg; Zoey Dollaz	—	—
June 8, 2017	Vancouver	Canada	Rogers Arena	Migos; Tory Lanez; ASAP Ferg; Zoey Dollaz	—	—
June 10, 2017	Auburn	United States	White River Amphitheatre	Migos; ASAP Ferg; A Boogie wit da Hoodie; Zoey Dollaz	—	—
June 11, 2017	Ridgefield	United States	Sunlight Supply Amphitheater	Young Thug; ASAP Ferg; Zoey Dollaz	—	—
June 13, 2017	Mountain View	United States	Shoreline Amphitheatre	Migos; Tory Lanez; ASAP Ferg; Zoey Dollaz	—	—
June 14, 2017	Wheatland	United States	Toyota Amphitheatre	Migos; Tory Lanez; ASAP Ferg; Zoey Dollaz	—	—
June 15, 2017	Mountain View	United States	Shoreline Amphitheatre	Migos; Tory Lanez; ASAP Ferg; Zoey Dollaz	—	—
June 16, 2017	Inglewood	United States	The Forum	Migos; Tory Lanez; ASAP Ferg; Zoey Dollaz	—	—
June 22, 2017	The Woodlands	United States	Cynthia Woods Mitchell Pavilion	Migos; Tory Lanez; ASAP Ferg; Zoey Dollaz	—	—
June 23, 2017	Austin	United States	Austin360 Amphitheatre	Young Thug; Tory Lanez; ASAP Ferg; Zoey Dollaz	—	—
June 24, 2017	Dallas	United States	Starplex Pavilion	Tory Lanez; ASAP Ferg; Zoey Dollaz	—	—
June 27, 2017	Chula Vista	United States	Mattress Firm Amphitheatre	Migos; ASAP Ferg; Zoey Dollaz	—	—
June 28, 2017	Phoenix	United States	Ak-Chin Pavilion	Migos; ASAP Ferg; Zoey Dollaz	—	—
June 29, 2017	Albuquerque	United States	Isleta Amphitheater	Migos; ASAP Ferg; Zoey Dollaz	—	—
June 30, 2017	Las Vegas	United States	T-Mobile Arena	Migos; ASAP Ferg; Zoey Dollaz	—	—
Total					—	—

== Cancelled shows ==
Date	City	Country	Venue	Reason
May 9, 2017	Jackson	United States	Mississippi Coliseum	Unknown
June 13, 2017	Denver	United States	Pepsi Center	Unknown
