= Mayhem Festival 2008 =

2008 heavy metal music festival

- North American tour by Mayhem Festival
- Promotional poster for the festival
- Location: United States; Canada
- Start date: July 9, 2008
- End date: August 19, 2008
- Legs: 1
- No. of shows: 30

Mayhem Festival concert chronology
- Mayhem Festival 2008; Mayhem Festival 2009

Mayhem Festival 2008 was the first iteration of the annual concert festival created by Kevin Lyman.

== Mayhem Festival 2008 tour information ==
The Mayhem Festival, like most large festivals of a similar caliber, feature bands that recently released or are just about to release a new album. All of the main stage headliners will be promoting their new albums on this tour, as well as some of the second and third stage bands like 36 Crazyfists, Black Tide and Underoath.

The festival also offers some other activities such as playing the newest video games, perusing vendors, attending autograph signing sessions.

Rockstar Energy Drinks will be sampling their products. Additional sponsors include Jägermeister, Hot Topic and DiNGLIFE.com (Device Personalization Company). FUSE Television and Revolver Magazine (who will produce the Official Tour Program) have signed on as official Rockstar Energy Mayhem Festival media partners. Live Nation is set to promote the festival nationally.

Also joining the tour is the Metal mulisha freestyle motocross team. In the press release regarding the tour, a founding member of the Metal Mulisha and freestyle rider named Brian Deegan was quoted saying "They’ll be mixing the sound of riffing and ripping 250CC motorcycles flying 150 feet in the air against the backdrop of double bass drums and shredding guitars."

=== Sevendust pulls out of tour ===
Sevendust originally planned on participating in the festival, but pulled out of the festival according to Blabbermouth.net. The band was replaced by Underoath.

=== Slipknot injuries ===
During the opening date of the festival on July 9, Sid Wilson the turntablist of Slipknot broke both of his heels when he jumped from an elevated area of the stage and landed incorrectly. Despite the injury, he promised to perform on all dates of the tour even in a wheelchair. With both his legs in casts he returned with the band on the second date of the festival on July 12 in a wheelchair, he has however performed without it (he was seen on August 10 with the chair on stage and included it into the act). Throughout the tour, he has been seen to repeatedly slip out of the wheelchair in order to crawl across the stage and climb upon the set pieces and drum set. His 'Moon Boots' as Corey Taylor calls them, are displayed to the audience at some point during the set.

During the tour Slipknot drummer Joey Jordison also suffered an injury by breaking his ankle. Slipknot finished the tour regardless but were forced to cancel several appearances at European festivals due to the injury.

== Mayhem Festival 2008 lineup ==
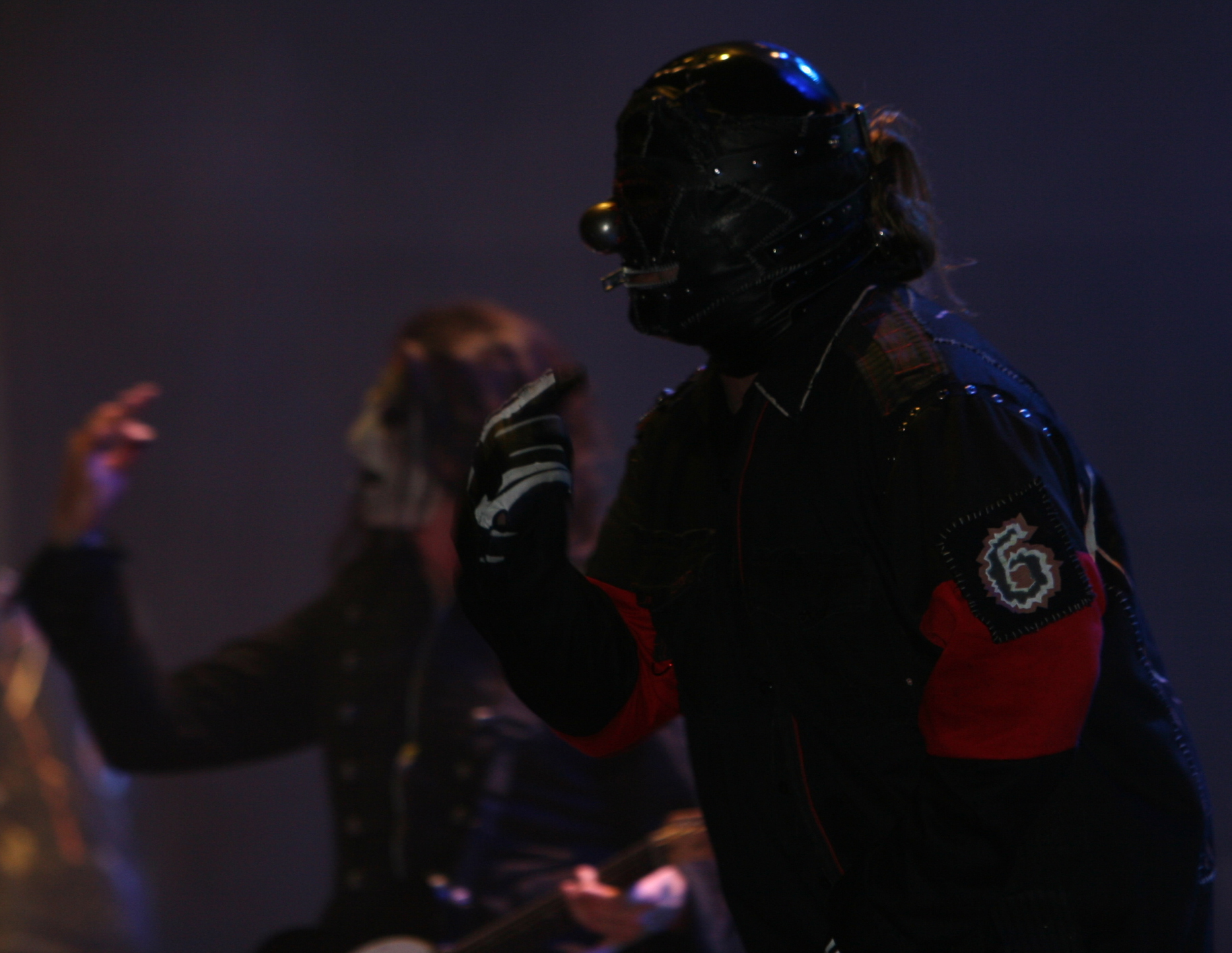
Slipknot performing on the opening date in Auburn, Washington

=== Main stage ===
- Slipknot
- Disturbed
- DragonForce
- Mastodon

=== Jägermeister Stage ===
- Machine Head
- Airbourne
- Five Finger Death Punch
- Walls of Jericho
- Jägermeister Opening Band (See Below)

=== Hot Topic Stage ===
- Underoath
- Black Tide
- Suicide Silence
- 36 Crazyfists
- The Red Chord

== Tour dates ==
Date	City	Country	Venue	Jägermeister opening band
July 9, 2008	Auburn	United States	White River Amphitheatre	Drown Mary
July 12, 2008	Mountain View	United States	Shoreline Amphitheatre	Stigmurder
July 13, 2008	San Bernardino	United States	San Manuel Amphitheater	Sixx
July 14, 2008	Wheatland	United States	Sleep Train Amphitheatre (Show moved from July 11 due to wild fires)	Vengince
July 15, 2008	Fresno	United States	Save Mart Center	Six Ounce Gloves
July 16, 2008	Chula Vista	United States	Cricket Wireless Amphitheatre	Mower
July 18, 2008	Phoenix	United States	Cricket Wireless Pavilion	Psychostick
July 19, 2008	Albuquerque	United States	Journal Pavilion	
July 20, 2008	Greenwood Village	United States	Fiddler's Green Amphitheatre	Switchpin
July 22, 2008	Bonner Springs	United States	Capitol Federal Park at Sandstone Amphitheater	Continent of Ash
July 23, 2008	Maryland Heights	United States	Verizon Wireless Amphitheater	Conquest
July 25, 2008	Dallas	United States	SuperPages.com Center	
July 26, 2008	Selma	United States	Verizon Wireless Amphitheater	Powderburn
July 27, 2008	Houston	United States	Sam Houston Race Park	The Destro
July 29, 2008	Tampa	United States	Ford Amphitheatre	The Autumn Offering
July 30, 2008	West Palm Beach	United States	Cruzan Amphitheatre	The Autumn Offering
August 1, 2008	Virginia Beach	United States	Verizon Wireless Amphitheatre	Epoxy
August 2, 2008	Burgettstown	United States	Post-Gazette Pavilion	Hemlock
August 3, 2008	Scranton	United States	Toyota Pavilion at Montage Mountain	
August 5, 2008	Mansfield	United States	Comcast Center	Kingdom of Sorrow
August 6, 2008	Uniondale	United States	Nassau Coliseum	Kingdom of Sorrow
August 8, 2008	Toronto	Canada	Downsview Park	
August 9, 2008	Clarkston	United States	DTE Energy Music Theatre	Ray Street Park
August 10, 2008	Tinley Park	United States	First Midwest Bank Amphitheatre	SOiL
August 12, 2008	Atlanta	United States	Lakewood Amphitheatre	Colossick
August 13, 2008	Noblesville	United States	Verizon Wireless Music Center	Dead Broke
August 15, 2008	Camden	United States	Susquehanna Bank Center	Beyond the Scar
August 16, 2008	Hartford	United States	New England Dodge Music Center	Unbroken
August 17, 2008	Bristow	United States	Nissan Pavilion	Stuck in Kaos
August 19, 2008	Corfu	United States	Darien Lake Performing Arts Center	STEMM
