= Mayhem Festival 2015 =

2015 heavy metal music festival

- North American tour by Mayhem Festival
- Location: United States; Canada
- Start date: June 26, 2015
- End date: August 2, 2015
- Legs: 1
- No. of shows: 26

Mayhem Festival concert chronology
- Mayhem Festival 2014; Mayhem Festival 2015; Mayhem Festival 2024

Mayhem Festival 2015 was the eighth annual Mayhem Festival. It was confirmed that Slayer, King Diamond, Hellyeah and The Devil Wears Prada will be headlining the festival, while Whitechapel, Thy Art Is Murder, Jungle Rot and Sister Sin would be among those supporting. Dates were announced on April 13, 2015. It was the final Mayhem festival until the return was announced as a one-day festival in October 2024

== Mayhem Festival 2015 lineup ==
=== Main stage ===
- Slayer
- King Diamond
- Hellyeah
- The Devil Wears Prada

=== Victory Records Stage ===
- Whitechapel
- Thy Art Is Murder
- Jungle Rot
- Sister Sin
- Sworn In
- Shattered Sun
- Feed Her to the Sharks
- Code Orange
- Kissing Candice

== Dates ==
Date	City	Country	Venue
June 26, 2015	Chula Vista, California	United States	Sleep Train Amphitheatre
June 27, 2015	San Bernardino, California	United States	San Manuel Amphitheater
June 28, 2015	Mountain View, California	United States	Shoreline Amphitheatre
June 30, 2015	Auburn, Washington	United States	White River Amphitheater
July 1, 2015	Nampa, Idaho	United States	Ford Idaho Center
July 3, 2015	Phoenix, Arizona	United States	Ak-Chin Pavilion
July 4, 2015	Albuquerque, New Mexico	United States	Isleta Amphitheater
July 5, 2015	Morrison, Colorado	United States	Red Rocks Amphitheatre
July 7, 2015	Council Bluffs, Iowa	United States	Harrah's Council Bluffs
July 8, 2015	Milwaukee	United States	Eagles Ballroom
July 10, 2015	Noblesville, Indiana	United States	Klipsch Music Center
July 11, 2015	Clarkston, Michigan	United States	DTE Energy Music Theatre
July 12, 2015	Tinley Park, Illinois	United States	First Midwest Bank Amphitheater
July 15, 2015	Toronto	Canada	Molson Canadian Amphitheatre
July 17, 2015	Camden, New Jersey	United States	Susquehanna Bank Center
July 18, 2015	Burgettstown, Pennsylvania	United States	First Niagara Pavilion
July 19, 2015	Hartford, Connecticut	United States	Xfinity Theatre
July 21, 2015	Holmdel, New Jersey	United States	PNC Bank Arts Center
July 22, 2015	Erie, Pennsylvania	United States	Erie Insurance Arena
July 24, 2015	Bristow, Virginia	United States	Jiffy Lube Live
July 25, 2015	Mansfield, Massachusetts	United States	Xfinity Center
July 26, 2015	Wantagh, New York	United States	Nikon at Jones Beach Theater
July 29, 2015	Atlanta	United States	Aaron's Amphitheatre at Lakewood
July 31, 2015	New Braunfels, Texas	United States	Whitewater Amphitheater
August 1, 2015	The Woodlands, Texas	United States	Cynthia Woods Mitchell Pavilion
August 2, 2015	Dallas	United States	Gexa Energy Pavilion

°July 22, New Hampshire's show was cancelled and was replaced with Erie, Pennsylvania.
