= Mayhem Festival 2009 =

2009 heavy metal music festival

- North American tour by Mayhem Festival
- Promotional poster for the festival
- Location: United States
- Start date: July 10, 2009
- End date: August 16, 2009
- Legs: 1
- No. of shows: 26

Mayhem Festival concert chronology
- Mayhem Festival 2008; Mayhem Festival 2009; Mayhem Festival 2010

Mayhem Festival 2009 was the second annual North American Mayhem Festival founded by Kevin Lyman. In July 2009 a DLC song pack was sold in the music video game Rock Band 2.

== Rockstar Mayhem Festival 2009 line up ==
Band lineup as released by the press release from the Mayhem Festival website and bands page of the Mayhem Festival website.

=== Main Stage ===
- Marilyn Manson
- Slayer
- Killswitch Engage
- Bullet for My Valentine
- Mushroomhead (replace Bullet for My Valentine on 7/31 - 8/02)

=== Jägermeister Stage ===
- Trivium
- All That Remains
- God Forbid
- Jägermeister Battle of the Bands winner (one per location):

=== Hot Topic Stage ===
- Cannibal Corpse
- Behemoth
- Job for a Cowboy
- The Black Dahlia Murder
- Whitechapel

== Tour dates ==
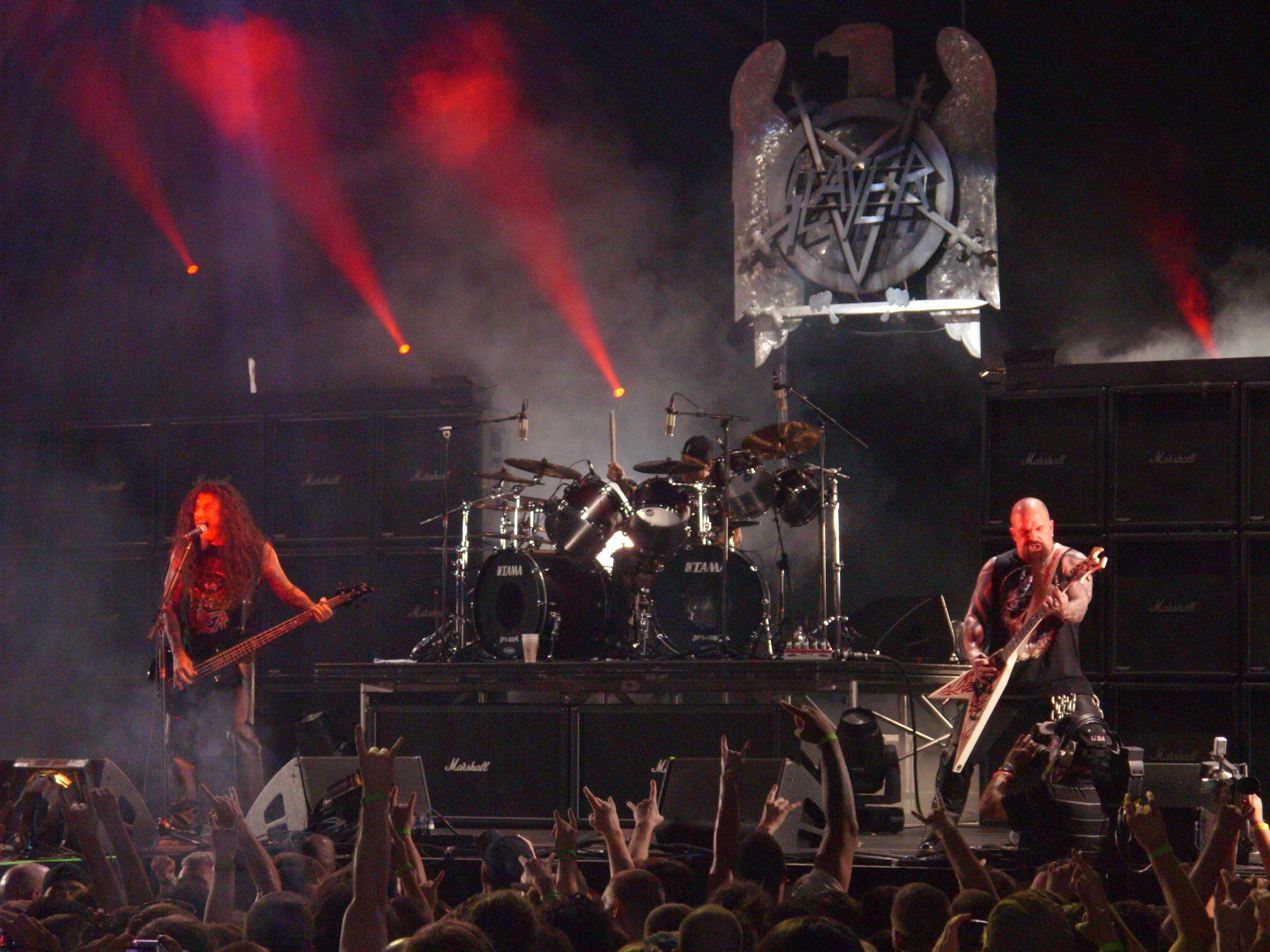
Slayer performing at the Toyota Pavilion in Scranton, Pennsylvania

Mayhem Festival 2009 tour dates as seen on official website. Some dates that were originally seen on the press release have been removed with no explanation given.

Date	City	Country	Venue	Jägermeister opening band
July 10, 2009	Marysville	United States	Sleep Train Amphitheatre	Skinlab
July 11, 2009	Mountain View	United States	Shoreline Amphitheatre	Corrupt Absolute
July 12, 2009	San Bernardino	United States	San Manuel Amphitheater	Madlife
July 14, 2009	Auburn	United States	White River Amphitheatre	Northwest Royale
July 17, 2009	Phoenix	United States	Cricket Wireless Pavilion	Hemlock
July 18, 2009	Albuquerque	United States	Journal Pavilion	Hemlock
July 19, 2009	Greenwood Village	United States	Fiddler's Green Amphitheatre	Switchpin
July 21, 2009	Bonner Springs	United States	Sandstone Amphitheater	Continent of Ash
July 22, 2009	Maryland Heights	United States	Verizon Wireless Amphitheater	Seasons After
July 24, 2009	Atlanta	United States	Lakewood Amphitheatre	Swingshot
July 25, 2009	Noblesville	United States	Verizon Wireless Music Center	Ascend Through the Depths
July 26, 2009	Tinley Park	United States	First Midwest Bank Amphitheatre	Dirge Within
July 29, 2009	Scranton	United States	Toyota Pavilion	Xfactor1
July 31, 2009	Cuyahoga Falls	United States	Blossom Music Center	Mobile Deathcamp, Once Pure
August 1, 2009	Burgettstown	United States	Post-Gazette Pavilion	Lost Chapter
August 2, 2009	Clarkston	United States	DTE Energy Music Theatre	Know Lyfe
August 4, 2009	Mansfield	United States	Comcast Center for the Performing Arts	STEMM
August 6, 2009	Virginia Beach	United States	Virginia Beach Amphitheater	Property
August 7, 2009	Camden	United States	Susquehanna Bank Center	Beyond the Scar
August 8, 2009	Hartford	United States	New England Dodge Music Center	Soul Made Visible
August 9, 2009	Bristow	United States	Nissan Pavilion	Saint Diablo
August 11, 2009	Tampa	United States	Ford Amphitheatre	Must Not Kill
August 12, 2009	West Palm Beach	United States	Cruzan Amphitheatre	Gollum
August 14, 2009	San Antonio	United States	AT&T Center	Negative 263
August 15, 2009	Dallas	United States	SuperPages.com Center	Adakain
August 16, 2009	Oklahoma City	United States	Zoo Amphitheater	
