= Mayhem Festival 2013 =

2013 heavy metal music festival

- North American tour by Mayhem Festival
- Location: United States; Canada
- Start date: June 29, 2013
- End date: August 4, 2013
- Legs: 1
- No. of shows: 26

Mayhem Festival concert chronology
- Mayhem Festival 2012; Mayhem Festival 2013; Mayhem Festival 2014

Mayhem Festival 2013 was the sixth annual Mayhem Festival. Dates were announced on January 28, 2013, and lineup announced March 18, 2013. It was the first year that the Mayhem Festival had four stages.

Polish death metal band Behemoth were scheduled to perform but announced on June 5 that they were sitting out of the tour due to drummer Inferno taking ill and needing appendix surgery.

== Mayhem Festival 2013 lineup ==
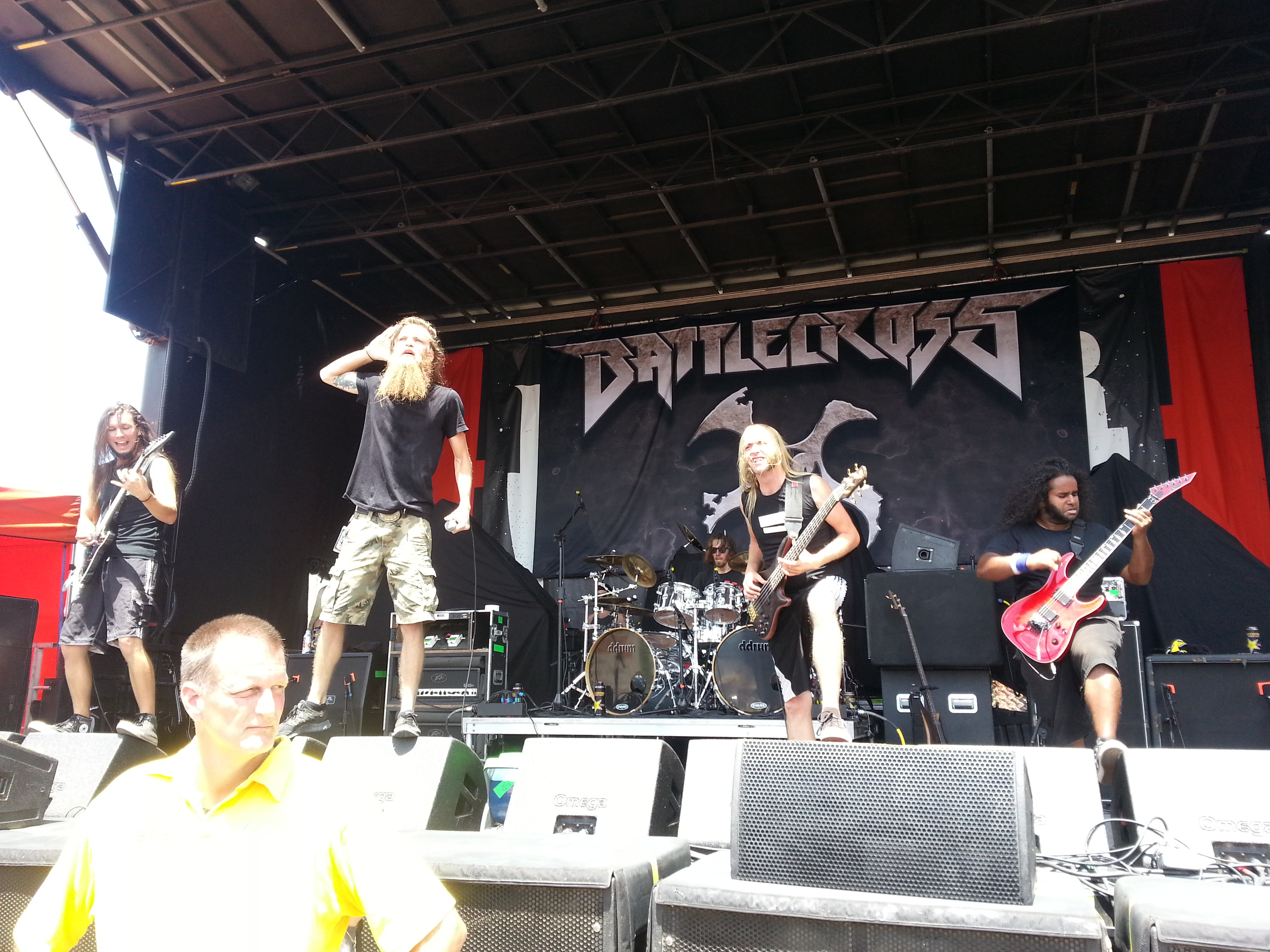
Battlecross performing at Mayhem Festival in Dallas, Texas with touring percussionist Kevin Talley of Dååth

=== Mainstage ===
- Rob Zombie
- Five Finger Death Punch
- Mastodon
- Amon Amarth

=== Jägermeister Stage ===
- Machine Head
- Job for a Cowboy
- Butcher Babies
- Battlecross
- Huntress

=== Musician's Institute Stage ===
- Children of Bodom
- Emmure
- Born of Osiris
- Motionless in White
- Attika 7
- Thrown Into Exile

=== Sumerian Records Stage ===
- Scorpion Child
- City in the Sea

== Dates ==
Date	City	Country	Venue
June 29, 2013	San Bernardino, California	United States	San Manuel Amphitheater
June 30, 2013	Mountain View, California	United States	Shoreline Amphitheatre
July 2, 2013	Nampa, Idaho	United States	Idaho Center Amphitheatre
July 3, 2013	Auburn, Washington	United States	White River Amphitheatre
July 5, 2013	Phoenix, Arizona	United States	Ashley Furniture HomeStore Pavilion
July 6, 2013	Albuquerque, New Mexico	United States	Isleta Amphitheatere
July 7, 2013	Englewood, Colorado	United States	Fiddler's Green Amphitheatre
July 10, 2013	Toronto, Ontario	Canada	Molson Canadian Amphitheatre
July 12, 2013	Burgettstown, Pennsylvania	United States	First Niagara Pavilion
July 13, 2013	Scranton, Pennsylvania	United States	Toyota Pavilion
July 14, 2013	Corfu, New York	United States	Darien Lake Performing Arts Center
July 16, 2013	Mansfield, Massachusetts	United States	Comcast Center
July 17, 2013	Bangor, Maine	United States	Bangor Waterfront
July 19, 2013	Camden, New Jersey	United States	Susquehanna Bank Center
July 20, 2013	Saratoga Springs, New York	United States	Saratoga Performing Arts Center
July 21, 2013	Hartford, Connecticut	United States	Comcast Theatre
July 23, 2013	Holmdel, New Jersey	United States	PNC Bank Arts Center
July 24, 2013	Bristow, Virginia	United States	Jiffy Lube Live
July 26, 2013	Noblesville, Indiana	United States	Klipsch Music Center
July 27, 2013	Tinley Park, Illinois	United States	First Midwest Bank Amphitheatre
July 28, 2013	Clarkston, Michigan	United States	DTE Energy Music Theatre
July 30, 2013	Atlanta	United States	Aaron's Amphitheatre at Lakewood
July 31, 2013	Tampa, Florida	United States	Live Nation Amphitheatre at the Florida State Fairgrounds
August 2, 2013	Austin, Texas	United States	Circuit of the Americas
August 3, 2013	The Woodlands, Texas	United States	Cynthia Woods Mitchell Pavilion
August 4, 2013	Dallas, Texas	United States	Gexa Energy Pavilion
