= Mayhem Festival 2010 =

2010 heavy metal music festival

- North American tour by Mayhem Festival
- Promotional poster for the festival
- Location: United States; Canada
- Start date: July 10, 2010
- End date: August 14, 2010
- Legs: 1
- No. of shows: 26

Mayhem Festival concert chronology
- Mayhem Festival 2009; Mayhem Festival 2010; Mayhem Festival 2011

Mayhem Festival 2010 was the third annual Mayhem Festival created by Kevin Lyman. The 2010 edition of the festival was co-headlined by Korn and Rob Zombie. As in previous years, the main sponsor of the festival is Rockstar Energy drink, and each date had a different Battle of the Bands winner performing on the Jägermeister stage. In addition to three stages with various heavy metal bands, Mayhem Festival 2010 also hosted other entertainment acts. As in previous years, the Freestyle Motocross stunt team Metal Mulisha returned, in addition to comedian Jay Oakerson and a costume party/variety act "Beacher's Madhouse" featuring DJs and the scantily clad "Beacher's Babies".

In April 2010, an oil rig in the Gulf of Mexico owned by Transocean and operated under contract for BP, exploded, which led to a massive oil spill in a disaster known as the Deepwater Horizon oil spill. At this time, several people around the world, including Mayhem Festival 2010 headliner Korn, decided to boycott BP by not purchasing their fuel. Jonathan Davis, the lead singer of Korn commented, "We need to do our part to let BP know there are consequences for causing something like this. We want to send a message to corporations like BP so that they will take more preventive measures in the future." Korn will not be using BP, or oil from partnering companies, to fuel their tour buses during upcoming concert dates and also encouraged the other 2010 Mayhem Festival bands to participate in the boycott. Several artists not on the Mayhem Festival later joined in on Korn's boycott, including Disturbed, Rise Against, and Megadeth. Korn's encouragement for Mayhem bands to join the boycott eventually made its way to tour founder Kevin Lyman, who decided the entire festival would not be using BP oil. In a press release, Lyman stated that he is, "encouraging everyone we deal with to find alternative ways to get down the road this summer."

== Mayhem Festival 2010 lineup ==
=== Main stage ===
- Korn
- Rob Zombie
- Lamb of God
  - Avenged Sevenfold (July 25 and 27 only)
- Five Finger Death Punch

=== Silver Star Stage ===
- Atreyu
- Norma Jean
- In This Moment
- 3 Inches of Blood

=== Jägermeister stage ===
- Hatebreed
- Chimaira
- Shadows Fall (cancelled August 10 and 11, replaced by The Athiarchists for those dates)
- Winds of Plague* (cancelled August 10 and 11)
- Jägermeister Battle of the Bands winner

Note: Despite being announced as performing on the Jägermeister stage on press releases, Winds of Plague performed on the Silver Star stage on most of the tour dates.

== Tour dates ==
Date	City	Country	Venue	Battle of the Bands winner
July 10, 2010	Devore	United States	San Manuel Amphitheater	Sangre
July 11, 2010	Mountain View	United States	Shoreline Amphitheatre	Vengince
July 13, 2010	Auburn	United States	White River Amphitheatre	Drown Mary
July 14, 2010	Nampa	United States	Idaho Center Amphitheatre	A Balance of Power
July 16, 2010	Phoenix	United States	Cricket Wireless Pavilion	Hostility
July 17, 2010	Albuquerque	United States	Hard Rock Casino Albuquerque Presents The Pavilion	Eve of an End
July 18, 2010	Greenwood Village	United States	Comfort Dental Amphitheatre	Eve of an End
July 20, 2010	Maryland Heights	United States	Verizon Wireless Amphitheater	Psychostick
July 21, 2010	Cincinnati	United States	Riverbend Music Center	Ascend Through the Depths
July 23, 2010	Camden	United States	Susquehanna Bank Center	Beyond The Scar
July 24, 2010	Hartford	United States	The Comcast Theatre	Hemlock
July 25, 2010	Montreal	Canada	Parc Jean-Drapeau	
July 27, 2010	Mansfield	United States	Comcast Center	Stemm
July 28, 2010	Holmdel Township	United States	PNC Bank Arts Center	His Name Was Yesterday
July 30, 2010	Tinley Park	United States	First Midwest Bank Amphitheatre	SOiL
July 31, 2010	Noblesville	United States	Verizon Wireless Music Center	Xfactor1
August 1, 2010	Atlanta	United States	Lakewood Amphitheatre	Mobile Death Camp
August 3, 2010	Raleigh	United States	Time Warner Cable Music Pavilion	Gollum
August 4, 2010	Virginia Beach	United States	Virginia Beach Amphitheater	Saint Diablo
August 6, 2010	Clarkston	United States	DTE Energy Music Theatre	Tension Head
August 7, 2010	Burgettstown	United States	First Niagara Pavilion	Waiting for Never
August 8, 2010	Bristow	United States	Jiffy Lube Live	Art of Destruction
August 10, 2010	Tampa	United States	Ford Amphitheatre	Must Not Kill
August 11, 2010	West Palm Beach	United States	Cruzan Amphitheatre	Catalysis
August 13, 2010	Dallas	United States	SuperPages.com Center	Brotherhood
August 14, 2010	Oklahoma City	United States	Zoo Amphitheatre	Upon a Burning Body
