= Mayhem Festival 2014 =

2014 heavy metal music festival

- North American tour by Mayhem Festival
- Location: United States; Canada
- Start date: July 5, 2014
- End date: August 10, 2014
- Legs: 1
- No. of shows: 28

Mayhem Festival concert chronology
- Mayhem Festival 2013; Mayhem Festival 2014; Mayhem Festival 2015

Mayhem Festival 2014 was the seventh annual Mayhem Festival. Dates were announced on February 18, 2014, and lineup officially announced March 31, 2014.

In a January 2014 video interview at the NAMM Show, Korn guitarist James 'Munky' Shaffer revealed that Korn and Avenged Sevenfold would headline the 2014 Mayhem Festival. On March 5, over 3 weeks ahead of the scheduled official announcement, nearly the entire lineup leaked.

== Mayhem Festival 2014 lineup ==
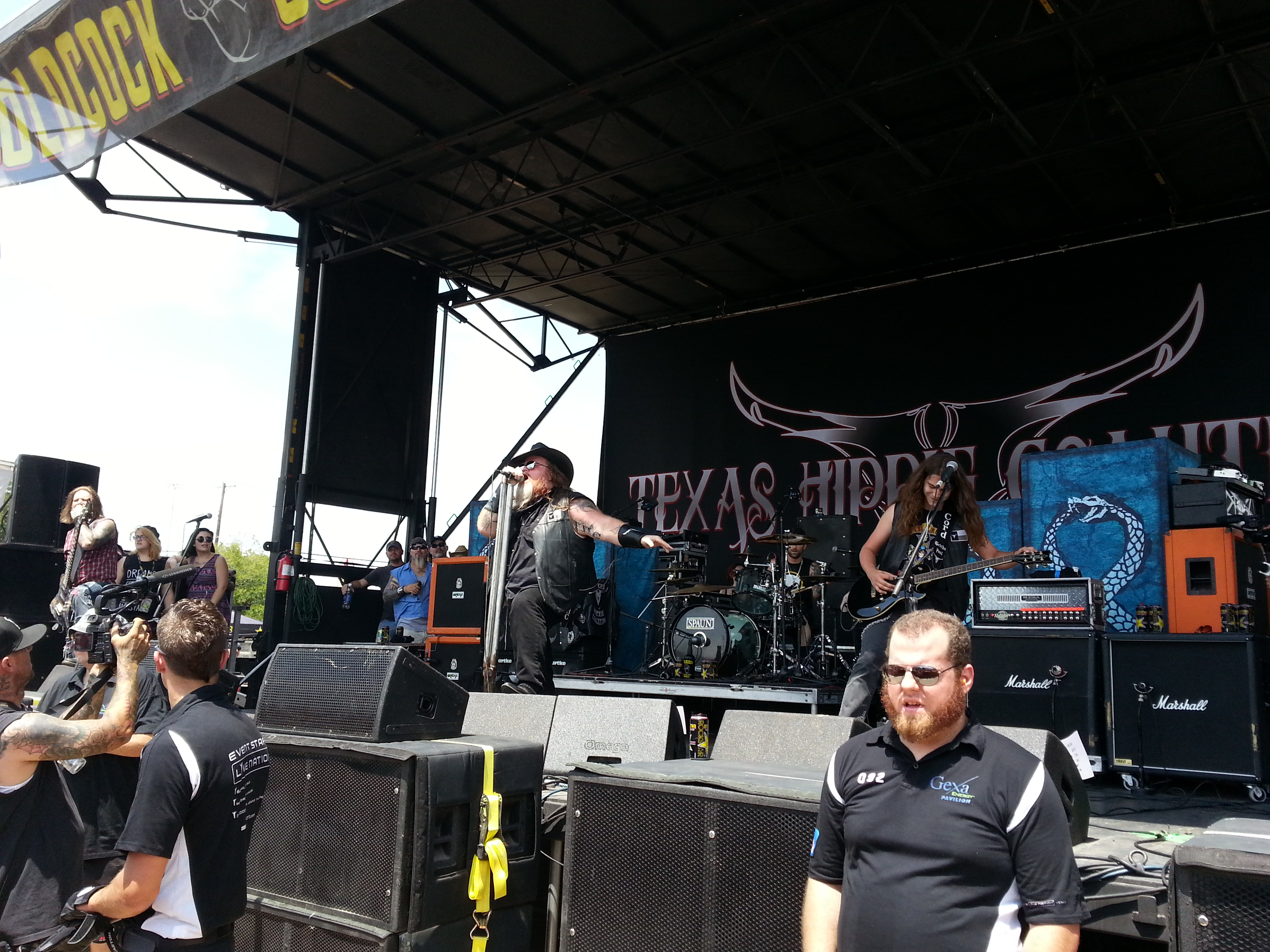
Texas_Hippie_Coalition performing at Mayhemfest 2014

=== Mainstage ===
- Avenged Sevenfold
- Korn
- Asking Alexandria
- Trivium

=== Coldcock American Herbal Whiskey Stage ===
- Cannibal Corpse
- Suicide Silence
- Miss May I
- Mushroomhead
- Texas Hippie Coalition
- King 810
- Hell or Highwater

=== Sumerian Records / Headbang For The Highway Stage ===
- Body Count
- Upon a Burning Body
- Veil of Maya
- Darkest Hour
- "Headbang For The Highway"

=== Victory Records Stage ===
- Emmure
- Ill Niño
- Wretched
- Islander
- Erimha
- Second Pass

== Dates ==
Date	City	Country	Venue
July 5, 2014	San Bernardino, California	United States	San Manuel Amphitheater
July 6, 2014	Mountain View, California	United States	Shoreline Amphitheatre
July 8, 2014	Auburn, Washington	United States	White River Amphitheatre
July 9, 2014	Nampa, Idaho	United States	Idaho Center
July 11, 2014	Phoenix, Arizona	United States	Ak-Chin Pavilion
July 12, 2014	Albuquerque, New Mexico	United States	Isleta Amphitheater
July 14, 2014	Morrison, Colorado	United States	Red Rocks Amphitheatre
July 16, 2014	Maryland Heights, Missouri	United States	Verizon Wireless Amphitheater
July 17, 2014	Clarkston, Michigan	United States	DTE Energy Music Theatre
July 18, 2014	Milwaukee	United States	The Rave
July 19, 2014	Noblesville, Indiana	United States	Klipsch Music Center
July 20, 2014	Tinley Park, Illinois	United States	First Midwest Bank Amphitheatre
July 22, 2014	Mansfield, Massachusetts	United States	Xfinity Center
July 23, 2014	Saratoga Springs, New York	United States	Saratoga Performing Arts Center
July 25, 2014	Toronto	Canada	Molson Canadian Amphitheatre
July 26, 2014	Burgettstown, Pennsylvania	United States	First Niagara Pavilion
July 27, 2014	Hartford, Connecticut	United States	Xfinity Theatre
July 29, 2014	Darien, New York	United States	Darien Lake Performing Arts Center
July 30, 2014	Wantagh, New York	United States	Nikon at Jones Beach Theater
August 1, 2014	Camden, New Jersey	United States	Susquehanna Bank Center
August 2, 2014	Scranton, Pennsylvania	United States	Toyota Pavilion at Montage Mountain
August 3, 2014	Bristow, Virginia	United States	Jiffy Lube Live
August 5, 2014	Atlanta	United States	Aaron's Amphitheatre at Lakewood
August 6, 2014	Millington, Tennessee	United States	Memphis Motorsports Park
August 7, 2014	Oklahoma City	United States	OKC Downtown Airpark
August 8, 2014	San Antonio	United States	Backstage Live
August 9, 2014	Dallas	United States	Gexa Energy Pavilion
August 10, 2014	Houston	Cynthia Woods Mitchell Pavilion	

A number of the dates were scheduled to feature altered lineups:

- Denver (Main Stage acts only: Avenged Sevenfold, Korn, Asking Alexandria, Trivium and Body Count)
- Wantagh (Main Stage acts only: Avenged Sevenfold, Korn, Asking Alexandria, Trivium)
- San Bernardino + Mountain View (Emmure did not perform at these shows)
- Houston (Main stage and Coldcock Stage artists, as well as Body Count and Emmure. King 810 did not perform)
- Milwaukee featured 18 bands, but Avenged Sevenfold and Korn did not perform (dubbed "A Taste Of Rockstar Energy Drink Mayhem Festival")
