= Mayhem Festival 2012 =

2012 heavy metal music festival

- Tour by Mayhem Festival
- Location: United States
- Start date: June 30, 2012
- End date: August 5, 2012
- No. of shows: 27

Mayhem Festival concert chronology
- Mayhem Festival 2011; Mayhem Festival 2012; Mayhem Festival 2013

Mayhem Festival 2012 was the fifth annual Mayhem Festival. Dates were announced on October 26, 2011.

== Mayhem Festival 2012 lineup ==
=== Main stage ===
- Slipknot
- Slayer
- Motörhead
- Rotating band slot

==== Rotating bands ====
Bands rotated between opening main stage and supporting Anthrax on Jägermeister stage

- The Devil Wears Prada (June 30 – July 11)
- As I Lay Dying (July 13 – July 24)
- Asking Alexandria (July 25 – August 5)

=== Jägermeister stage ===
- Anthrax
- Lethal Dosage (Tucson local band)
- Rotating band slot
- Whitechapel
- Upon A Burning Body (June 30 – July 11)
- Betraying the Martyrs (July 13 – July 24)
- I the Breather (July 25 – August 5)
- Ventana (July 28)
- Silvertung (August 5)
- Jägermeister Battle of the Bands Winner

=== Sumerian Records stage ===
- Upon A Burning Body (July 13 – August 5)
- I the Breather (June 30 – July 24)
- Betraying the Martyrs (June 30 – July 11) (July 25 – August 5)
- Dirtfedd
- Sumerian Stage local Headbang for the Highway Battle of the Bands Winner (Thrown Into Exile – 6/30), (Karin Comes Killing – 7/4) (Depths of Mariana – 7/29), (Spiral Fracture – 7/29), (Eyes of Torment - 7/14)

== Dates ==
Date	City	Country	Venue
June 30, 2012	San Bernardino	United States	San Manuel Amphitheater
July 1, 2012	Mountain View	United States	Shoreline Amphitheatre
July 3, 2012	Auburn	United States	White River Amphitheatre
July 4, 2012	Nampa	United States	Idaho Center
July 6, 2012	Phoenix	United States	Ashley Furniture HomeStore Pavilion
July 7, 2012	Albuquerque	United States	Hard Rock Casino
July 8, 2012	Greenwood Village	United States	Comfort Dental Amphitheatre
July 10, 2012	Dallas	United States	Gexa Energy Pavilion
July 11, 2012	The Woodlands	United States	Cynthia Woods Mitchell Pavilion
July 13, 2012	Tampa	United States	1-800-ASK-GARY Amphitheatre
July 14, 2012	Atlanta	United States	Aaron's Amphitheatre at Lakewood
July 15, 2012	Noblesville	United States	Klipsch Music Center
July 17, 2012	Bonner Springs	United States	Sandstone Amphitheater
July 18, 2012	Oklahoma City	United States	Zoo Amphitheatre
July 20, 2012	Maryland Heights	United States	Verizon Wireless Amphitheater
July 21, 2012	Tinley Park	United States	First Midwest Bank Amphitheatre
July 22, 2012	Clarkston	United States	DTE Energy Music Theatre
July 24, 2012	Cincinnati	United States	Riverbend Music Center
July 25, 2012	Cuyahoga Falls	United States	Blossom Music Center
July 27, 2012	Camden	United States	Susquehanna Bank Center
July 28, 2012	Burgettstown	United States	First Niagara Pavilion
July 29, 2012	Bristow	United States	Jiffy Lube Live
July 31, 2012	Saratoga Springs	United States	Saratoga Performing Arts Center
August 3, 2012	Mansfield	United States	Comcast Center
August 4, 2012	Scranton	United States	Toyota Pavilion
August 5, 2012	Hartford	United States	Comcast Theatre
