= Mayhem Festival 2011 =

2011 heavy metal music festival

- North American tour by Mayhem Festival
- Location: United States; Canada
- Start date: July 9, 2011
- End date: August 14, 2011
- Legs: 1
- No. of shows: 27

Mayhem Festival concert chronology
- Mayhem Festival 2010; Mayhem Festival 2011; Mayhem Festival 2012
Megadeth tour chronology
European Carnage Tour (2011)	Mayhem Festival (2011)	TH1RT3EN World Tour (2011)

The heavy metal music tour, Mayhem Festival 2011, was the fourth annual Mayhem Festival created by Kevin Lyman. The official lineup was announced on January 31, 2011. It was the first year that the festival utilized a rotating main stage slot, and the first year that the tour had more than one act returning from previous lineups.

== Rotating Main Stage openers ==
The 2011 iteration of Mayhem Festival was notable as the first year in which the tour utilized multiple acts to fill the opening slot on the main stage on different ranges of days. Machine Head opened the Main stage from the tour's onset until July 20, Trivium performed from July 22 to August 2, and In Flames played from August 3 until they dropped off the tour. While one band opened the main stage, the other two instead performed as headliners on the Jägermeister Mobile Stage and Revolver Stage.

== In Flames drops off festival ==
On July 31, Swedish band In Flames announced that they would not be able to continue touring with the festival by posting this on their official website: "It is with huge regret that today with immediate effect In Flames must cancel their current US shows as part of the Mayhem tour and their own US Headline shows. Due to a serious terminal illness of one [of] the band's immediate family members, they feel they have no option. We have had the most amazing and fun times as part of the Mayhem tour and we are truly grateful for all the support the whole festival has shown. We will be back at the start of 2012. Once again, our apologies"

== Mayhem Festival 2011 lineup ==
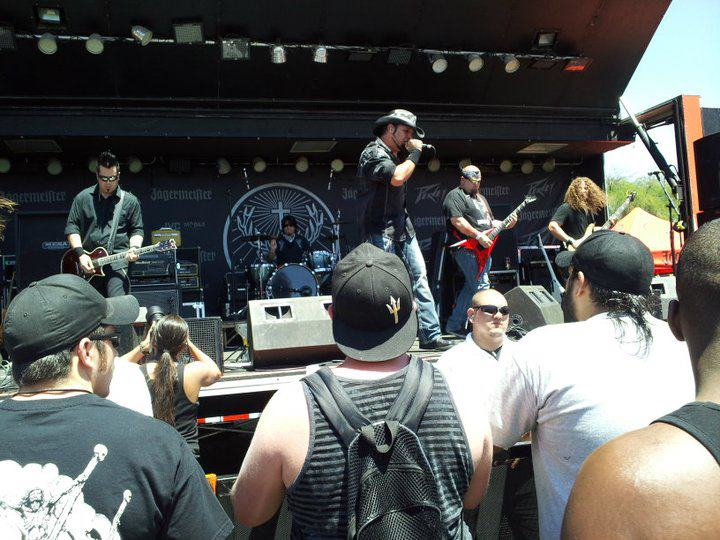
Phoenix rock metal band Back From Ashes performing with Nate Gullickson of Throw Logic and Dan Johnson of Love and Death at Mayhem Festival 2011 in Arizona

=== Main Stage ===
- Disturbed
- Godsmack
- Megadeth
  - Dethklok (replaced Megadeth on 7/09)

==== Rotating Main Stage openers ====
- Machine Head
- Trivium
- In Flames
- Hatebreed (Replaced Trivium between 8/5/11 - 8/7/11)

=== Revolver Stage ===
  - Testament (headlined 7/31-8/14, replacing In Flames)
- Suicide Silence
- All Shall Perish (cancelled July 24, replaced by The Athiarchists for that date)
- Straight Line Stitch

=== Jägermeister Mobile Stage ===
  - The Athiarchists (headlining in place of In Flames after 7/31)
- Unearth
- Kingdom of Sorrow
- Red Fang
- Jägermeister Battle of the Bands winner

== Tour dates ==
Date	City	Country	Venue	Lineup changes	Jägermeister Band
July 9, 2011	San Bernardino	United States	San Manuel Amphitheater	Dethklok replaced Megadeth, Testament replaced In Flames	Nihilist
July 10, 2011	Mountain View	United States	Shoreline Amphitheatre	Testament replaced In Flames	Valdur
July 12, 2011	Auburn	United States	White River Amphitheatre		Drown Mary
July 13, 2011	Nampa	United States	Idaho Center Amphitheatre	Local Band 57 Heavy was added as an additional opener on the Revolver Stage	A Balance of Power
July 15, 2011	Phoenix	United States	Ashley Furniture HomeStore Pavilion		Back from Ashes
July 16, 2011	Albuquerque	United States	Hard Rock Casino Albuquerque Presents The Pavilion		Until Chaos
July 17, 2011	Greenwood Village	United States	Comfort Dental Amphitheatre		Switchpin
July 19, 2011	Maryland Heights	United States	Verizon Wireless Amphitheater		Psychostick
July 20, 2011	Cincinnati	United States	Riverbend Music Center		Mobile Deathcamp
July 22, 2011	Mansfield	United States	Comcast Center		Dead Season
July 23, 2011	Montreal	Canada	Parc Jean Drapeau	All Mayhem Fest 2011 bands except Megadeth (who headlined Heavy TO) appeared.	
July 24, 2011	Hartford	United States	The Comcast Theatre	All Shall Perish did not perform this date.	Hell Within
July 26, 2011	Corfu	United States	Darien Lake Performing Arts Center	103.3 The Edge's Summer BBQ with Godsmack, Disturbed, Megadeth, In Flames and Trivium only. Machine head was also scheduled to appear but cancelled	
July 27, 2011	Holmdel	United States	PNC Bank Arts Center		Dr. Acula
July 29, 2011	Burgettstown	United States	First Niagara Pavilion		Lost Chapter
July 30, 2011	Bristow	United States	Jiffy Lube Live		Silvertung
July 31, 2011	Camden	United States	Susquehanna Bank Center		Beyond the Scar
August 2, 2011	Virginia Beach	United States	Virginia Beach Amphitheater		Saint Diablo
August 3, 2011	Raleigh	United States	Time Warner Cable Music Pavilion		Gollum
August 5, 2011	Tinley Park	United States	First Midwest Bank Amphitheatre	Hatebreed replaced Trivium	Seven Year Existence
August 6, 2011	Clarkston	United States	DTE Energy Music Theatre	Hatebreed replaced Trivium	Tension Head
August 7, 2011	Noblesville	United States	Verizon Wireless Music Center	Hatebreed replaced Trivium	The Surface
August 9, 2011	Oklahoma City	United States	Zoo Amphitheatre	Megadeth and Machine Head did not appear.	Texas Hippie Coalition
August 10, 2011	Dallas	United States	SuperPages.com Center		Powderburn
August 12, 2011	Atlanta	United States	Lakewood Amphitheatre		Uncrowned
August 13, 2011	Tampa	United States	1-800-ASK-GARY Amphitheatre		Catalysis
August 14, 2011	West Palm Beach	United States	Cruzan Amphitheatre		Must Not Kill
