= The Athiarchists =

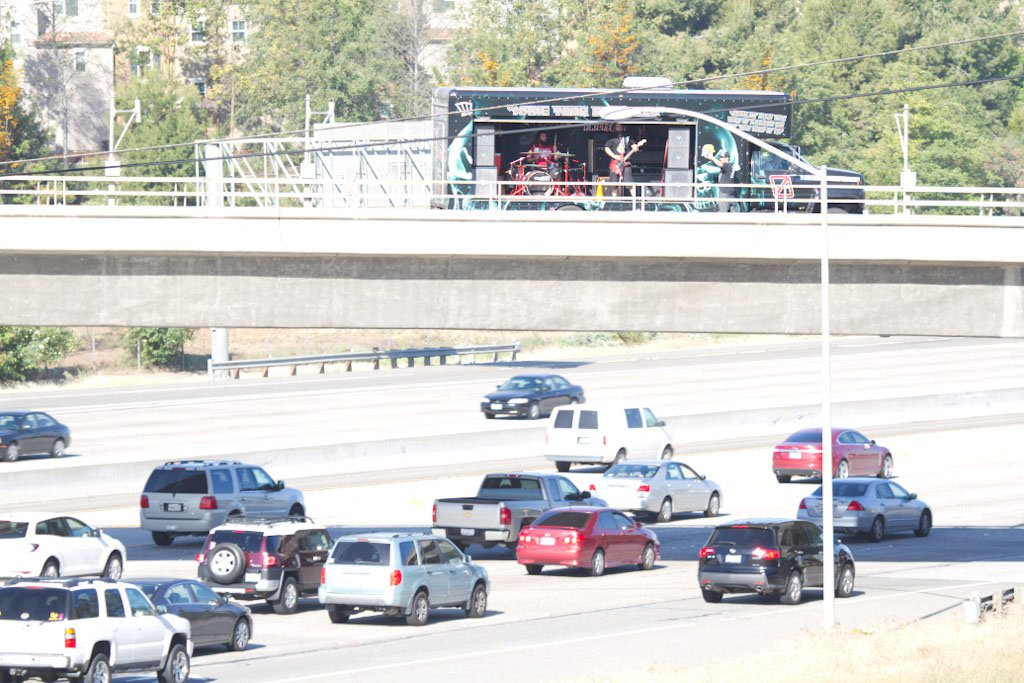
- The Athiarchists performing on an overpass above the 405 Freeway in Irvine, California

Background information
- Origin: Eugene, Oregon, United States
- Genres: punk, metal, thrash metal
- Years active: 2005–present
- Labels: The Athiarchists
- Website: www.athiarchists.com

The Athiarchists are an American two-piece, hardcore, thrash metal band from Eugene, Oregon, United States. They originally formed on April 20, 2006. The duo consists of Aaron "The Athiarchist" Tunnell on guitar, bass and vocals, and Dano "The Animal" on drums and vocals.

Through DIY ethics, a can-do attitude, hard work, and honest respect for the fans, they quickly gained popularity in their home of Eugene and worked their way into a national touring act.

They are most well known for poaching shows wherever they want, which first began with the purchase of a generator they used to play shows in the parking lots of events they wanted to play, including dates of the Mayhem Festival along the West Coast since its beginning in 2008.

In 2010, they built the Music Adventure Stage, an overhauled 24-foot U-Haul truck. Loaded up with a 12,500-watt generator, full PA, stage, lighting, gear storage, and sleeping bunks, they played the parking lots and entry lines of many clubs, and festivals including Warped Tour, Jägermeister Music Tour, and their most notable, Mayhem Festival 2010. They began playing without permission, but after much support from other bands on the tour, and their ever-growing fan base, they were invited to finish out the Mayhem Festival 2010, and join up with the Uproar Festival. On August 10 and 11, 2010, they replaced Shadows Fall on the Jägermeister Stage due to bus failure.

On April 18, 2011, episode 4.03, they were featured on Rob Dyrdek's Fantasy Factory, titled 'The Bleeding Frogs', in which they join Rob Dyrdek and the cast of the show to create a supergroup called The Bleeding Frogs.

They performed on the Revolver stage at Mayhem Festival 2011 when All Shall Perish cancelled on July 24, 2011. They finished out the tour headlining the Jägermeister stage in place of In Flames after July 30, 2011, until the end of the tour. This was all at the same time they were also performing 3-4 times a day underneath the Metal Mulisha jump show at Mayhem Festival 2011.

At Knotfest 2015, they performed multiple shows per day for three days in their mobile stage for the campground patrons.

== Discography ==
Don't Be Another Part of the Herd (album)

- Released: "2008"
- Format: "CD"
- Tracks: 14

The Athiarchists EP (EP)

- Released: "2009"
- Format: "CD"
- Tracks: 5

A Verbal Lashing (album)

- Released: "2010"
- Format: "CD"
- Tracks: 10

WAR (album)

- Released: "2015"
- Format: "CD"
- Tracks: 26
