= Shattered Sun =

American heavy metal band

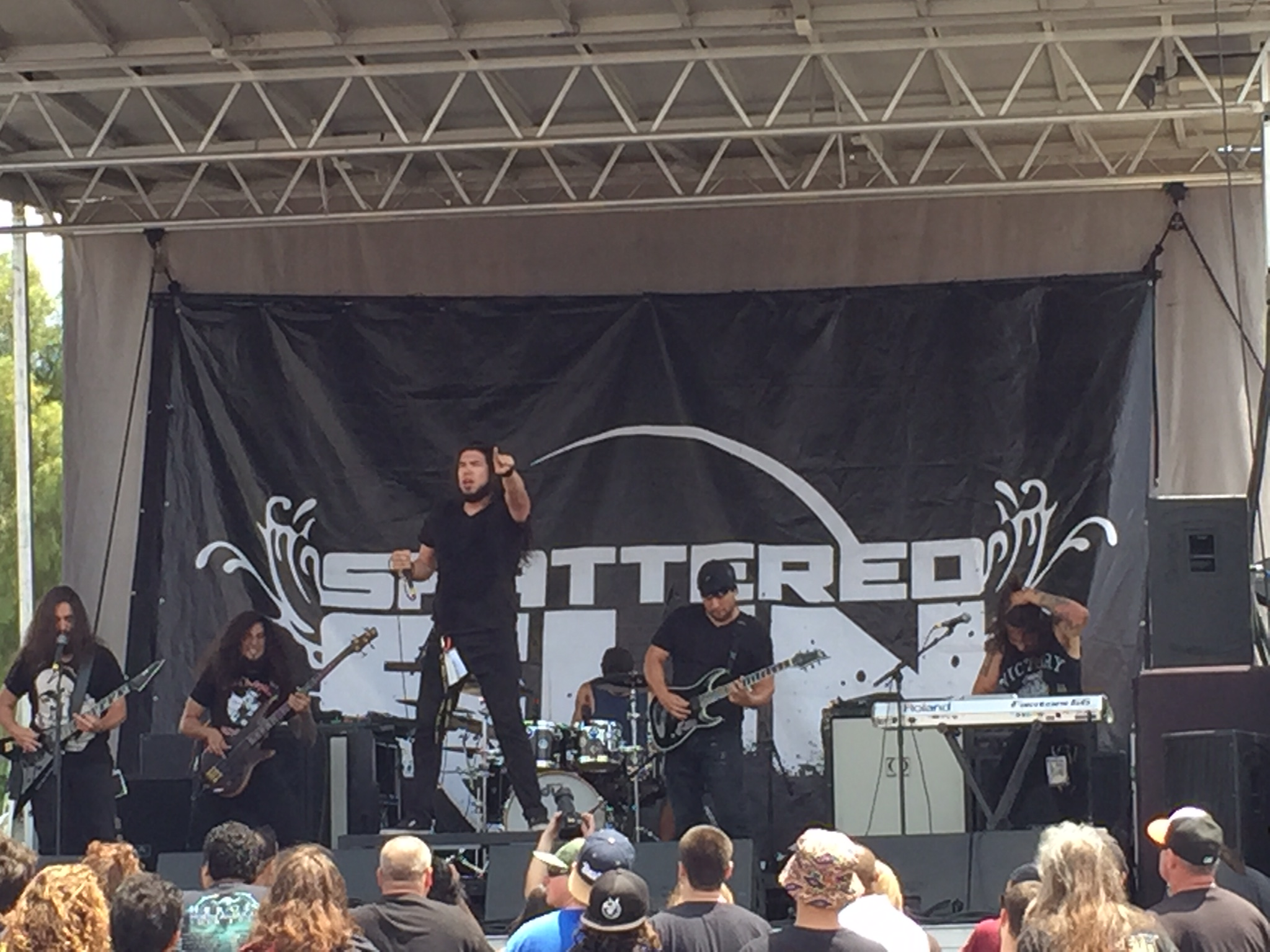
- Shattered Sun performing in Chula Vista, CA during the 2015 Rockstar Energy Drink Mayhem Festival

Background information
- Origin: Alice, Texas, U.S.
- Genres: Metalcore, thrash metal
- Years active: 2005–present
- Label: Victory
- Members: Joseph Guajardo; Henry Garza; Jessie Santos; Sebastian Elizondo; Juan Hinojosa; Marcos Leal
- Past members: Sebastian Ortiz; Steven King; Nick Garcia; Clem Galindo; Steven Garcia; Rudy Leal; Hector Villareal; Daniel Trejo; Robert Garza

Shattered Sun is an American metalcore band from Alice, Texas, formed in July 2005.

== History ==
Originally formed in July 2005 by Daniel Trejo and Sebastian Ortiz. Bassist Steven King, drummer Nick Garcia and vocalist Clem Galindo were added later that year. Later, Ortiz, Galindo and Nick Garcia would be replaced by Steven Garcia, Rudy Leal and Marcos Leal in 2006. They put out their first EP "The Lost Cause" in December 2006. In 2007, Steven Garcia left the band and was replaced with drummer Robert Garza. In August, they went to record with Ken Susi and put out "Endless Struggle". In 2009, Rudy Leal and King left the band. Also, they recorded another EP "Through Ashes" late 2009. Garza left in 2010, which led the band to be on hiatus. Marcos Leal went on to join Caldera, which included Joseph Guajardo and Hector Villareal. While Trejo took time off from the band, Garza returned in December 2010 and talks about starting the band up again was in play. In early 2011, Shattered Sun officially reformed in 2011 with the joining of Guajardo, Villareal and Henry Garza. They went on to record "Confessions" EP with producer Robert Beltran at Precision Studios in 2011. They soon made a video for their song "Any Means" and that is when things took off for the band. After the release of Confessions on March 31, 2012 the band played heavily promote it including an early 2012 tour with Memories In Broken Glass, immediately followed by a tour with Spineshank and Mureau.

In late 2013, Shattered Sun began working on their first full-length album, Hope Within Hatred. It was also the departure of guitarist Villareal, who left to pursue a stable oilfield job. Trejo then took main guitar duties, but he wanted a lead guitarist. Jessie Santos heard about a slot opening and came to try out with the band, mid-recording their new album. Once the band got Trejo's approval, Santos was soon in. His first recording was the solo on "The Ultimatum." In early 2014, the band signed with Breaking Bands LLC, a management team run by Jon Zazula and Chuck Billy of Testament.

On February 5 of 2015, Shattered Sun announced they had been signed to Victory Records, along with the April 21 release date for their debut full length Hope within Hatred, and a lyric video for the title track from the album. Just two days later the band announced via social media they would be playing the 2015 New England Metal and Hardcore Festival. On February 17'th they announced that they would be touring North America with Testament and Exodus.

On April 14, 2015, it was announced that Shattered Sun would be playing the entirety of the 2015 Rockstar Energy Drink Mayhem Festival, performing on the Victory Records stage.

Shattered Sun accompanied Soulfly on their 2015 We Sold Our Souls To Metal tour. Soilwork also joined the tour. The tour was scheduled for a 27-concert trek that started on September 30 and ended in Albuquerque, NM on October 30.

In 2018, rhythm guitarist Daniel Trejo departed Shattered Sun, which left the band without any founding members.

In 2019, Shattered Sun released a new single and music video for “Shades of Melodie” and announced; "While SHATTERED SUN are in the midst of preparing for the release of their new, currently-untitled album, many aspects of recording and other requirements still need to be completed. As the band is currently working independently and without label assistance, they've turned to their dedicated fans to contribute to the finalization process with new album pre-orders and bundle purchases. 100% of these funds will go towards the completion and release of the album, We are currently in the process of finishing our new album, as well as shopping for a new label home. We have decided not to wait – we’re ready to share our new single with all of you and introduce you to a new era of SHATTERED SUN."

In March 2020, Shattered Sun announced that they have signed with Hammerforged Records and it will be releasing a new album in late 2020; they also released the first single "Until It Breaks" available on all streaming platforms and music video on YouTube.

In 2021, lead vocalist Marcos Leal officially announced that he is doing vocals for Ill Nino while still being active in Shattered Sun. As of May 25, 2024, Shattered Sun has begun work on their upcoming new album.

== Band members ==
=== Current Lineup ===
- Marcos Leal - lead vocals (2006–present)
- Joseph Guajardo - bass (2010–present)
- Henry Garza - keyboards, backing vocals (2011–present)
- Jessie Santos - lead guitar, backing vocals (2013–present)
- Sebastian Elizondo - rhythm guitar, backing vocals (2018–present)
- Juan Hinojosa - drums (2019–present)

=== Former Members ===
- Clem Galindo - lead vocals (2005–2006)
- Sebastian Ortiz - lead guitar (2005–2006)
- Nick Garcia - drums (2005–2006)
- Steven Garcia - drums (2006–2007)
- Steven King - bass (2005–2009)
- Rudy Leal - lead guitar (2006–2009)
- Hector Villareal - lead guitar (2010–2013)
- Daniel Trejo Jr. - rhythm guitar (2005–2018)
- Robert Garza - drums (2007–2019)

Timeline

== Discography ==
=== Studio albums ===
- Confessions (2012)
- Hope Within Hatred (2015)
- The Evolution of Anger (2017)
- Bled For You (2020)
- TBA (2025)

=== EPs ===
- Lost Cause (2006)
- Endless Struggle (2007)
- Through Ashes (2009)

=== Singles ===
- "Hope Within Hatred" (2015) No. 35 US Mainstream Rock Songs
- “Shades of Melodie” (2019)
- “Until It Breaks” (2020)
- "Eternal" (2020)
