= Future Hndrxx Tour =

2017 concert tour by Future

- Tour by Future
- Location: North America • Europe • Africa • Oceania
- Associated album: FUTURE; HNDRXX
- Start date: July 8, 2017
- End date: October 23, 2017
- Legs: 6
- No. of shows: 14 in North America; 12 in Europe; 2 in Africa; 2 in Oceania; 30 total

Future concert chronology
- Nobody Safe Tour (2017); Future Hndrxx Tour (2017); Legendary Nights Tour (2018)

The Future Hndrxx Tour was a headlining concert tour by American rapper Future, in support of his eponymous album (2017) and his sixth studio album HNDRXX (2017). The tour began in Milwaukee on July 8, 2017, and concluded in London on October 23, 2017.

== Background ==
Following the Nobody Safe Tour, the rapper announced a second tour in 2017 that will take across North America, Europe, Africa and Oceania. Wizkid, Ty Dolla Sign, Post Malone, Zoey Dollaz, ASAP Ferg, YFN Lucci, Lil Yachty and Rich the Kid were announced as opening acts of the tour.

== Tour dates ==
List of concerts, showing date, city, country, venue, opening acts, tickets sold, number of available tickets and amount of gross revenue
Date	City	Country	Venue	Opening acts	Attendance	Revenue
North America
July 8, 2017 (Note: The concert of July 8, 2017 in Milwaukee at the American Family Insurance Amphitheater was a part of Summerfest.)	Milwaukee	United States	American Family Insurance Amphitheater	Big Sean; Migos	—N/a	—N/a
Europe
July 14, 2017 (Note: The concert of July 14, 2017 in Lisbon at Parque das Nações is a part of Super Bock Super Rock.)	Lisbon	Portugal	Parque das Nações	—N/a	—N/a	—N/a
Africa
July 21, 2017	Maputo	Mozambique	Adil Water Park	—N/a	—	—
July 22, 2017	Dar es Salaam	Tanzania	Leaders Club Kinondoni	—N/a	—	—
North America
August 5, 2017 (Note: The concert of August 5, 2017 in Toronto at Downsview Park is a part of VELD Music Festival.)	Toronto	Canada	Downsview Park	—N/a	—N/a	—N/a
August 13, 2017	West Palm Beach	United States	Perfect Vodka Amphitheatre	Ty Dolla Sign; Wizkid; Zoey Dollaz	—	—
August 14, 2017	Tampa	United States	MidFlorida Credit Union Amphitheatre	Post Malone; Zoey Dollaz	—	—
August 16, 2017	Jacksonville	United States	Daily's Place	Post Malone; Zoey Dollaz	—	—
August 18, 2017	Birmingham	United States	Legacy Arena	YFN Lucci; O.T. Genasis	—	—
August 20, 2017	Virginia Beach	United States	Veterans United Home Loans Amphitheater	Post Malone; Zoey Dollaz	—	—
August 21, 2017	Baltimore	United States	Royal Farms Arena	Post Malone; Zoey Dollaz	—	—
August 23, 2017	Saratoga Springs	United States	Saratoga Performing Arts Center	Post Malone; Zoey Dollaz	—	—
August 24, 2017	Atlantic City	United States	Boardwalk Hall	ASAP Ferg; Wizkid; Rich the Kid; Zoey Dollaz	7,295 / 7,611	$206,334
August 26, 2017	Syracuse	United States	Lakeview Amphitheater	Wizkid; Rich the Kid; Zoey Dollaz	—	—
August 27, 2017	Uncasville	United States	Mohegan Sun Arena	Wizkid; Rich the Kid; Zoey Dollaz	—	—
September 16, 2017 (Note: The concert of September 16, 2017 in New York City at Citi Field is a part of The Meadows Music & Arts Festival.)	New York City	United States	Citi Field	—N/a	—N/a	—N/a
September 17, 2017 (Note: The concert of September 17, 2017 in Atlanta at Piedmont Park is a part of Music Midtown.)	Atlanta	United States	Piedmont Park	—N/a	—N/a	—N/a
Oceania
September 23, 2017 (Note: The concert of September 23, 2017 in Melbourne at Catani Gardens is a part of Listen Out.)	Melbourne	Australia	Catani Gardens in St Kilda	—N/a	—N/a	—N/a
September 24, 2017 (Note: The concert of September 24, 2017 in Perth at HBF Stadium is a part of Listen Out.)	Perth	Australia	HBF Stadium	—N/a	—N/a	—N/a
Europe
October 10, 2017 (Note: The concert of October 10, 2017 in Trondheim at Elgeseter Gate 1 is a part of UKA.)	Trondheim	Norway	Elgeseter Gate 1	—N/a	—N/a	—N/a
October 11, 2017	Stockholm	Sweden	Hovet	Rich the Kid; Zoey Dollaz	—	—
October 12, 2017	Copenhagen	Denmark	Valby-Hallen	Rich the Kid; Zoey Dollaz	—	—
October 13, 2017	Berlin	Germany	Columbiahalle	Rich the Kid; Zoey Dollaz	—	—
October 15, 2017	Cologne	Germany	Cologne Palladium	Rich the Kid; Zoey Dollaz	—	—
October 16, 2017	Amsterdam	Netherlands	AFAS Live	Rich the Kid; Zoey Dollaz	—	—
October 17, 2017	Paris	France	Zénith Paris	Rich the Kid; Zoey Dollaz	—	—
October 18, 2017	Frankfurt	Germany	Jahrhunderthalle	Rich the Kid; Zoey Dollaz	—	—
October 20, 2017	Manchester	England	Manchester Academy	Rich the Kid; Zoey Dollaz	—	—
October 22, 2017	Birmingham	England	O_{2} Academy Birmingham	Rich the Kid; Zoey Dollaz	—	—
October 23, 2017	London	England	The O_{2} Arena	Rich the Kid; Zoey Dollaz	—	—
Total					—	—

== Cancelled shows ==
Date	City	Country	Venue	Reason
August 19, 2017	Charlottesville	United States	John Paul Jones Arena	Unite the Right rally
September 28, 2017	Auckland	New Zealand	Spark Arena	Death of a friend
September 30, 2017 (Note: The concert of September 30, 2017 in Sydney at Brazilian Fields at Centennial Park is a part of Listen Out.)	Sydney	Australia	Brazilian Fields	Death of a friend
October 1, 2017 (Note: The concert of October 1, 2017 in Brisbane at The Sporting Field at Victoria Park is a part of Listen Out.)	Brisbane	Australia	The Sporting Fields	Death of a friend
