= Reign Through Immortality =

Studio album by Erimha
- Released: July 8, 2013
- Recorded: 2013
- Genre: Symphonic black metal, melodic death metal
- Length: 46:55:00
- Label: Victory
- Producer: Chris Donaldson

Erimha chronology
Irkalla (2010)	Reign Through Immortality (2013)	Thesis ov Warfare (2015)

Professional ratings
Review scores
Source	Rating
Blabbermouth.net	8/10
Exclaim.ca	7/10
MetalSucks	3.5/5 stars
Revolver	3/5

Reign Through Immortality is the second studio album by Canadian heavy metal band Erimha. The album was released on July 8, 2013 through Victory Records, and was produced by Chris Donaldson.

== Track listing ==
No.	Title	Length
1.	"Enlightenment"	1:30
2.	"Ascetic"	4:16
3.	"Condemned to Desolation"	3:15
4.	"Bewildering Nightmare"	5:16
5.	"Metaphysic Countenance"	6:57
6.	"The Ritual of Internicion"	3:54
7.	"Verdict of the Soul"	3:52
8.	"Saunter to Extinction"	3:02
9.	"Cataclysmic Tides"	4:45
10.	"Metempsychosis"	10:08
Total length:		46:55

== Personnel ==
Erimha

- Gore – vocals
- Kthien – guitars
- Dlusternas – guitars
- Ksaos – drums

Additional musicians

- Christian Donaldson – bass
- Jonathan Lefrancois-Leduc – orchestration
- Fred Malizia – orchestration

Production

- Christian Donaldson – producer, engineer, mixing, mastering
