= Erimha =

Canadian extreme metal band

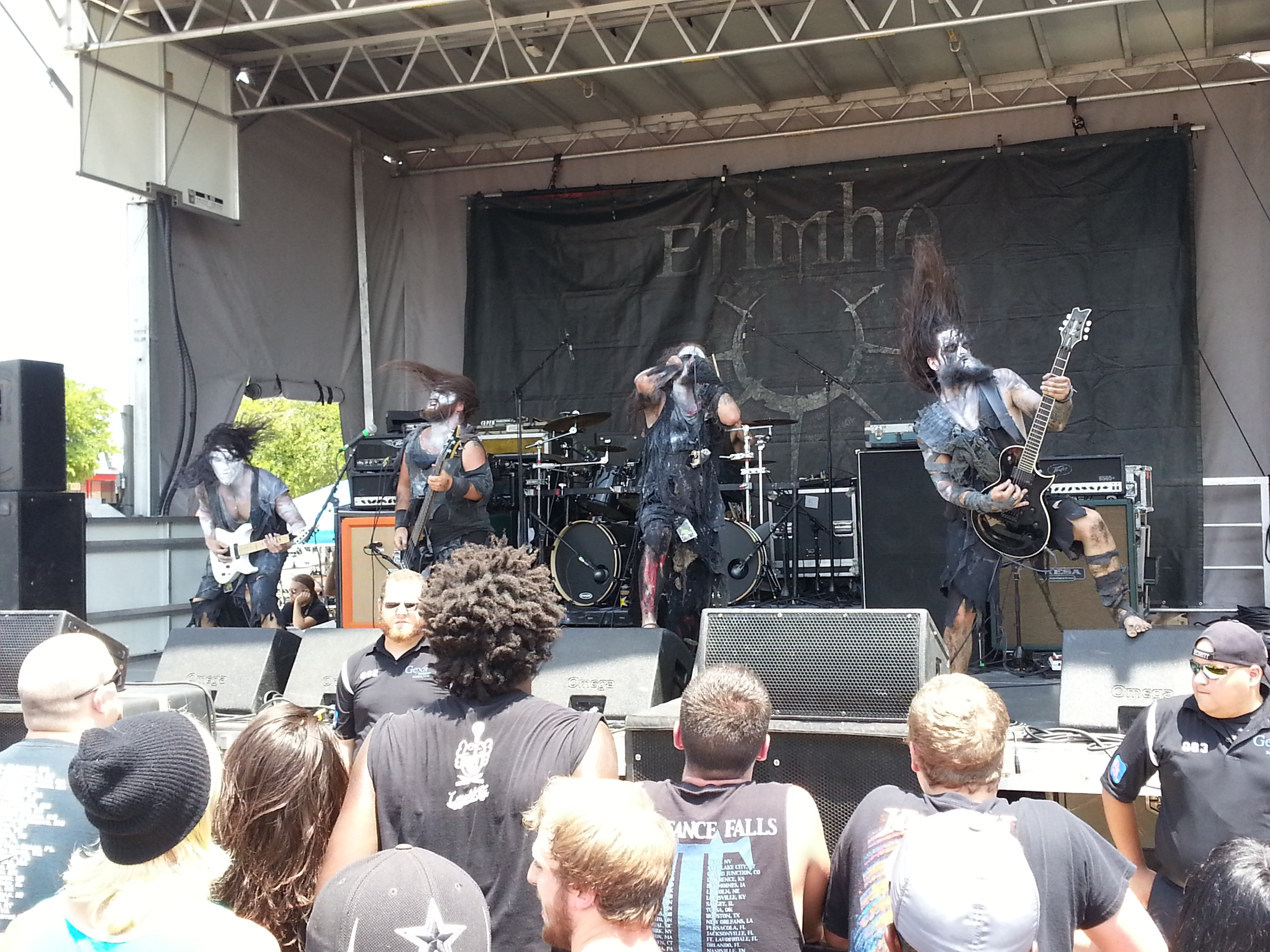

Background information
- Origin: Montreal, Quebec, Canada
- Genres: Symphonic black metal, melodic death metal, blackened death metal
- Years active: 2010–present
- Labels: Victory
- Members: Michel "Gore" Lussier; Jonathan "Ksaos" Drouin; "Kronik"
- Past members: Patrick "Kthien" Mercier; Lykan; Alix; Louis-Marc "Dlusternas" Lemay; Leather King

Erimha is a Canadian extreme metal band from Montreal, Quebec. The band name comes from the Sumerian word for army. The band members dress as ragged leather-clad corpses during performances.

== History ==
Erimha recorded their debut album, Irkalla, in 2010. The band released Reign Through Immortality in 2013 through Victory Records; the album was produced by Chris Donaldson. In 2014, the band performed in Fort Wayne, Indiana, and took part in the 2014 Mayhem Festival.

In 2015, the band released another black metal album, Thesis ov Warfare, with orchestrations by Ken Sorceron.

== Discography ==
=== Studio albums ===
- Irkalla (2010)
- Reign Through Immortality (2013)
- Thesis ov Warfare (2015)

== Band members ==
Current

- Michel "Gore" Lussier – vocals (2010–present)
- Jonathan "Ksaos" Drouin – drums (2010–present)
- "Kronik" – guitars (2014–present)

Former

- Patrick "Kthien" Mercier – guitars (2010–2017)
- Lykan – bass (2010–2013)
- Alix – guitars (2010–2011)
- Louis-Marc "Dlusternas" Lemay – guitars (2011–2014)
- Leather King – bass, backing vocals (2013–2015)
