= Feed Her to the Sharks =

Australian metalcore band

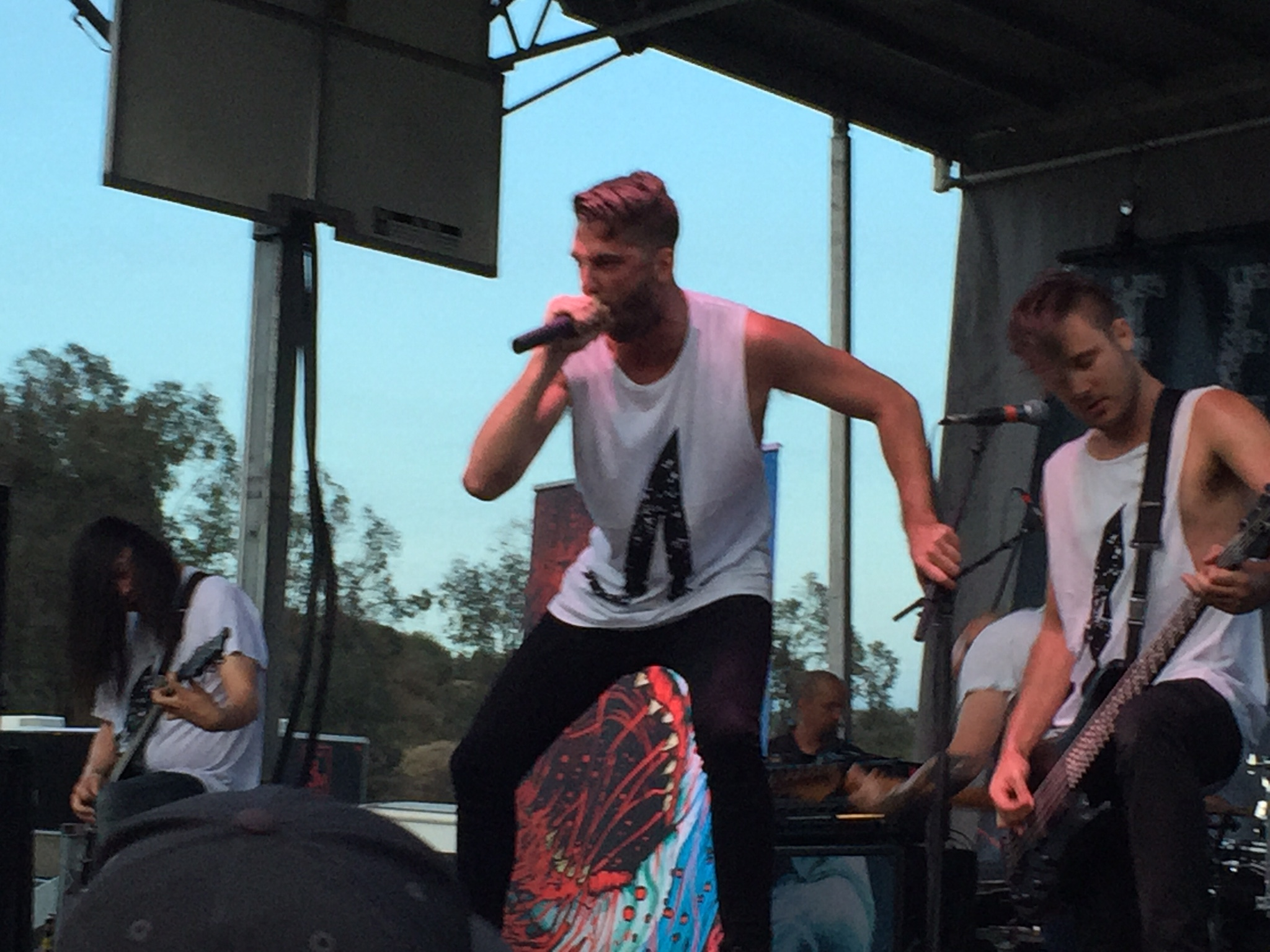
- Feed Her to the Sharks performing at Mayhem Festival 2015

Background information
- Origin: Melbourne, Australia
- Genre: Melodic metalcore
- Years active: 2008–2019, 2024-present
- Label: Victory
- Members: Andrew Van Der Zalm; Kim Choo; Robert Davies; Andrew 'Stix' Cotterell

Feed Her to the Sharks is an Australian metalcore band from Melbourne, formed in 2008 and disbanded in early 2019. The band has self-released two full-length albums, The Beauty of Falling (2010) and Savage Seas (2013), along with a third following their signing to Victory Records, Fortitude (2015).

== History ==
Since forming in 2010, the band mainly toured Australia as support to Asking Alexandria, Born of Osiris, Suicide Silence, and also performing on Warped Tour Australia in 2013.

In early 2013 the band released a lyric video for their new single "Memory of You" on Revolver, followed by the album Savage Seas. In support of their new album the band toured Australia with Born of Osiris, followed by shows in which the band headlined.

The band announced via their official social media accounts on 25 March 2014 that they had signed with Victory Records. This was followed by an Australian tour with Buried in Verona and Fit for a King. Later that summer they also announced on their social media that they were in the process of writing, and would begin recording their third full-length album in October 2014. On 6 January 2015 the band announced the title of the new album Fortitude, along with its release date of 15 February, pre-orders, and a stream for the single "The World Is Yours".

On 26 January 2015 KillYourStereo.com premiered the first part in a series of in-studio videos detailing the recording process of the band's new album, Fortitude. On 9 February the official music video for the song "Chasing Glory" premiered exclusively on Vevo, which was followed by the album release on 10 February. The following month Hysteria released an interview with the band chronicling their signing to Victory Records and the process leading up to their album release. On 6 May, the second official music video from Fortitude was released for the track "Burn The Traitor," which also premiered exclusively on Vevo, along with the announcement that they would be traveling to the US to play the entirety of the 2015 Rockstar Energy Drink Mayhem Festival.

The band opened for Killswitch Engage on their tour with Iron Maiden on 3 September 2024 in Frankston, Victoria.

== Members ==
- Kim Choo – guitar, keyboards, programming
- Marinos Katsanevas – guitar
- Robert Davies – bass guitar
- Andrew 'Stix' Cotterell – drums

=== Former members ===
- Andrew Van Der Zalm – vocals, keyboards, piano
- Jono – Guitar
- Daniel Wardan – Bass
- Chris Chapman – Drums

== Discography ==
=== Studio albums ===
- The Beauty of Falling (self-released, 2010)
- Savage Seas (self-released, 2013)
- Fortitude (Victory Records, 2015)

=== Singles ===
- "Memory of You" (2013)
- "Buried Alive" (2013)
- "Chasing Glory" (2015)
- "Burn The Traitor" (2015)
- "The World is Yours" (2015)
