= The Pavilion (Scranton, Pennsylvania) =

Outdoor theater in Scranton, Pennsylvania

Coordinates: 41.3479°N 75.6636°W

- Interactive map of The Pavilion
- Full name: The Pavilion at Montage Mountain
- Former names: Montage Mountain Performing Arts Center (1994–1999); Coors Light Amphitheatre (2000–2002); Ford Pavilion (2002–06); Toyota Pavilion (2006–13)
- Address: 1000 Montage Mountain Rd; Scranton, Pennsylvania, United States 18507-1767
- Location: Montage Mountain Ski Resort
- Owner: Lackawanna County Performing Arts Center Authority
- Operator: Live Nation
- Capacity: 16,000

Construction
- Groundbreaking: November 1999
- Opened: June 24, 2000
- Renovated: 2007
- Cost: $6 million
- Architect: Lenart Architecture
- Services engineer: FTL Happold

Website
- www.livenation.com

The Pavilion (originally known as the Montage Mountain Performing Arts Center) is an outdoor amphitheater located in Scranton, Pennsylvania, within the Montage Mountain Ski Resort. A temporary fixture was originally built in 1992, known as the Montage Mountain Amphitheater. Due to the venue's popularity, a permanent venue opened in 2000.

== History ==
In 1990, the Montage Mountain Ski Area began to host music festivals to bring in additional revenue during the resort's off season. A temporary stage with open lawn seating was opened on July 3, 1992, with a concert by Chubby Checker. Known as Montage Mountain Amphitheater, the popularity of the venue placed Scranton as a secondary market within the concert industry. In 1994, the resort teamed up with Metropolitan Entertainment further expand its concert season. The temporary staging remained, and bleacher-style seating was added in addition to the lawn . The capacity grew from 5,000 to 16,000 along with a name change, the Montage Mountain Performing Arts Center.

Beginning July 1994, the venue hosted an annual summer concert series. It was the success of the 1999 season that persuaded the owners to build a permanent facility. The $6 million project began construction in November 1999. The venue takes up 70 acres of the ski resort, with a wooded area separating the venue and parking spaces. Construction was completed in June 2000, just in time for the newly sponsored Coors Light Silver Bullet Concert Series. The new venue was opened on June 24, 2000, with a concert by Harry Connick Jr. The following day featured a concert by Britney Spears. The venue proved to be a financial success for the resort and the county. The first two seasons saw a revenue of $10 million.

In 2002, Clear Channel Communications took over operations and management from MEG. Along with the new management came the first sponsor for the venue, Ford Motor Company. When Clear Channel became Live Nation, Toyota Motor Corporation became a new sponsor. In 2007, the roof collapsed on Valentine's Day during the Blizzard of 2007. With the roof needing to be rebuilt, the owners also replaced the seating and updated the lighting, sound and video equipment. This was all completed in time for the 2007 summer season. In 2013, Toyota's sponsorship contract was up for renewal. The car company chose not to renew the contract. The venue became The Pavilion at Montage Mountain beginning January 1, 2014.

=== Naming history ===
Temporary facility

- Montage Mountain Amphitheater (July 1992 – May 1994)
- Montage Mountain Performing Arts Center (June 1994 – September 1999)

Permanent facility

- Coors Light Amphitheatre (June 2000 – May 2002)
- Ford Pavilion (June 2002 – May 2006)
- Toyota Pavilion (June 2006 – December 2013)
- The Pavilion (January 2014 – Present)

== Events ==
The amphitheatre played host to the Tattoo the Earth Tour on July 21, 2000. The show featured performances by Slipknot, Slayer, Sevendust, Sepultura, Hed PE, Mudvayne, downset., Hatebreed, Full Devil Jacket, Famous, Amen, U.P.O., Nothingface, PPM, Cold, Relative Ash, Kid Rock, Systematic, Six Feet Under, Candiria, Lamb of God, God Forbid, Darkest Hour, Unearth, All That Remains, Dropkick Murphys, Sick of It All, Tiger Army, Converge, The Unseen, Reach the Sky, Stretch Arm Strong, Kill Your Idols and Nashville Pussy. It also featured 42 tattoo artists from Australia, Austria, France, Germany, Malaysia, Manitoba, Spain, Switzerland and the US.

Van Halen played the temporary venue on August 27, 1995, and July 28, 1998.

In June 2005, upon their first visit to Northeastern Pennsylvania and the Toyota Pavilion, The Dave Matthews Band became the first music act to ever completely sell out the pavilion, attracting over 18,000 people. On their return in July 2006, they once again sold out the pavilion. Their performance on July 14, 2010, was recorded and released as a live album, entitled Live Trax Vol. 22.

Kings of Leon were scheduled to perform during their Come Around Sundown World Tour on June 8, 2010, with The Whigs as their opening act, but the show was cancelled, due to illness.

The amphitheatre has played host to many music festivals, including All That! Music and More Festival, Anger Management Tour, Crüe Fest, Crüe Fest 2, H.O.R.D.E. Festival, Lilith Fair, Lollapalooza, Mayhem Festival, Ozzfest, Peach Music Festival, Up in Smoke Tour, Uproar Festival and Vans Warped Tour.

Luke Bryan was the first country artist to sell out a show at the venue. The show took place July 30, 2015 on his Kick the Dust Up Tour with Randy Houser & Dustin Lynch as openers.

The Peach Music Festival, a music festival started by The Allman Brothers Band has taken place annually at the venue since 2012. It takes place over the course of several days in mid-August, and features stages around the venue and the nearby Montage Mountain Ski Resort, which is turned into a large water park in the summer months.

== See also ==
- List of contemporary amphitheatres
- Live Nation
