= Lakewood Amphitheatre =

Concert venue in Atlanta, Georgia, United States

SCANA Energy Amphitheatre at Lakewood
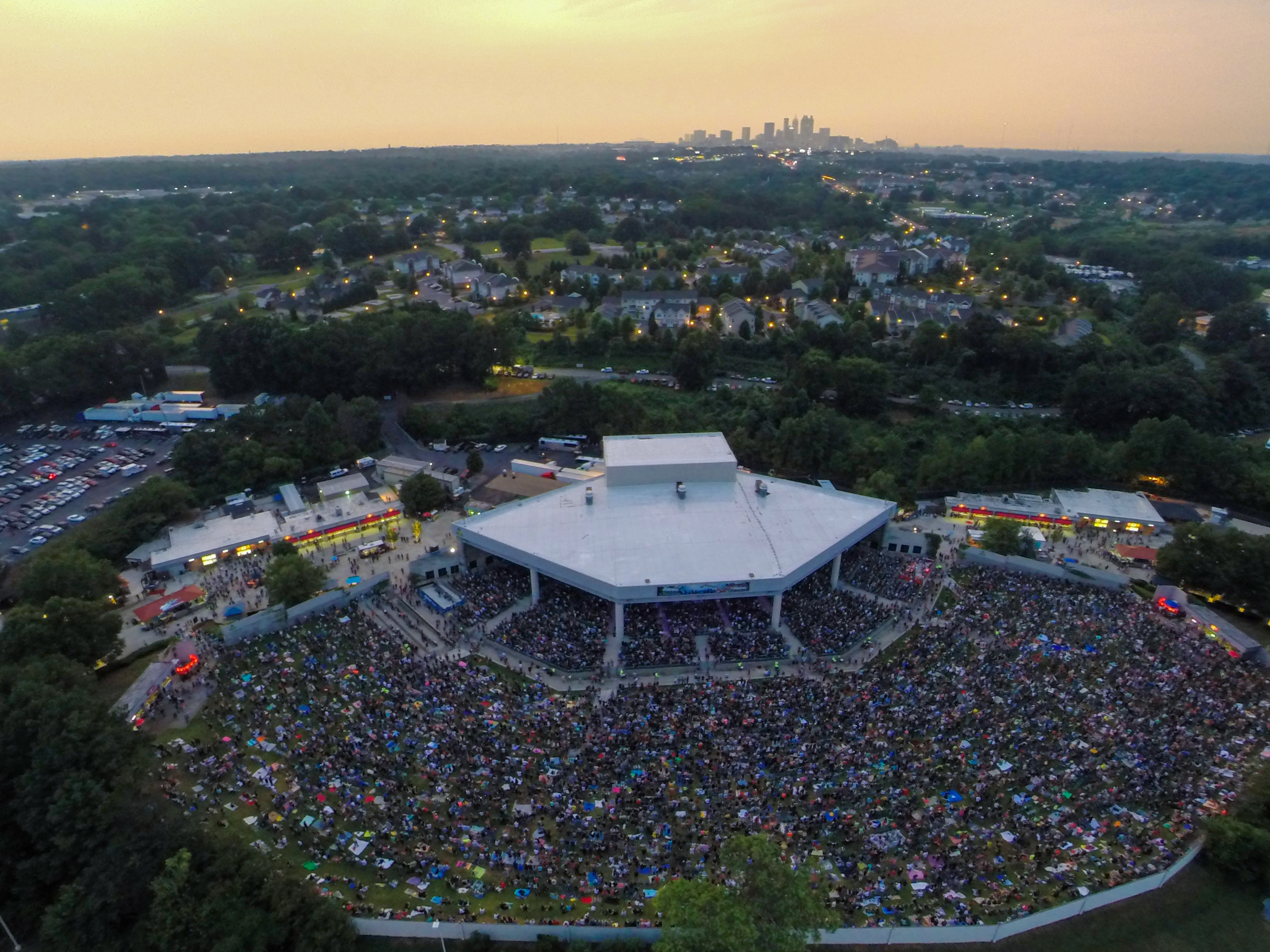
- Aerial view of venue, 2013
- Interactive map of SCANA Energy Amphitheatre at Lakewood
- Former names: Pace Amphitheater (planning/construction); Coca-Cola Lakewood Amphitheatre (1989–1998); Lakewood Amphitheatre (1999-2000; 2008–09; 2016–17; 2022-26); HiFi Buys Amphitheatre (2001–07); Aaron's Amphitheatre at Lakewood (2009–15); Cellairis Amphitheatre at Lakewood (2018-2021)
- Address: 2002 Lakewood Ave SE; Atlanta, GA 30315
- Location: Lakewood Fairgrounds, Lakewood Heights
- Coordinates: 33.704184°N 84.396018°W
- Owner: City of Atlanta
- Operator: Live Nation
- Capacity: 18,920

Construction
- Opened: July 1989
- Cost: US$10 million

Website
- www.scanaenergyampatlakewood.com

SCANA Energy Amphitheatre at Lakewood, originally Coca-Cola Lakewood Amphitheatre, is a concert venue located in Atlanta, which opened in 1989. The amphitheatre seats 18,920 (7,000 seated; 12,000 on the lawn). It was designed to offer a state-of-the-art musical experience for both music fans and artists. The venue was built specifically for popular music.

== Notable details ==
The amphitheatre is located approximately 4 miles south of downtown Atlanta, at the Lakewood Fairgrounds. Phish, among others, have called the amphitheatre one of their favorite venues to play at, due to the quality of the acoustics rarely found at lower-level roofed amphitheatres. Linkin Park used their performance of "One Step Closer" from Projekt Revolution 2004 on their LPU 4 CD and also used their performance of "The Little Things Give You Away" from Projekt Revolution 2007 on their LPU 7 CD. In 2008, the Verizon Wireless Amphitheatre at Encore Park opened in Alpharetta, Georgia, an affluent suburb on the north side of Atlanta. This gave Metro Atlanta another premier outdoor venue along with Lakewood, Chastain Park Amphitheater in Buckhead/Sandy Springs and the Frederick Brown Jr Amphitheater on the south side in Peachtree City.

== History of name changes ==
Originally named Lakewood Amphitheatre after opening in 1989, the amphitheater has since changed names several times and has now reverted to its original title. Known for a long time as the Coca-Cola Lakewood Amphitheatre, it briefly took up its original name again in 2000. Then in 2001, the venue became known as HiFi Buys Amphitheatre. It was not until 2008 that the venue again changed its name back to Lakewood Amphitheatre, at which point a logo not dissimilar to the one used prior to becoming the HiFi Buys Amphitheatre was used. In May 2009, Aaron's stepped in with a naming-rights agreement and between 2009 and 2015 the venue carried the title of Aaron's Amphitheatre at Lakewood, before becoming its classic name of Lakewood Amphitheatre once again in 2016. Starting November 2017 the venue got a new sponsor and was known as Cellairis Amphitheatre at Lakewood. At the conclusion of the Cellairis partnership, the venue name reverted back to Lakewood Amphitheatre. In November 2026, the venue entered a partnership with local company, SCANA Energy, and is now known as SCANA Energy Amphitheatre at Lakewood.

== Concerts ==
The following artists have performed at Lakewood Amphitheater:

- Bon Jovi – July 20, 1989
- Tom Petty and the Heartbreakers – August 4, 1989
- The Who – August 7-August 9, 1989
- Elton John – September 16–17, 1989
- The Cure – September 19, 1989
- Nitzer Ebb and Depeche Mode – June 4, 1990
- Crosby, Stills, Nash & Young – June 22, 1990
- Fleetwood Mac and Squeeze – June 23, 1990
- Eric Clapton – July 28, 1990
- Phil Collins – September 2, 1990
- Van Morrison – September 4, 1990
- Bell Biv DeVoe – April 8, 1991
- Yes – July 9, 1991
- Van Halen and Alice in Chains – August 16, 1991
- Sting – September 21, 1991
- Rod Stewart – October 17, 1991
- Allman Brothers Band and Little Feat – October 25, 1991
- The Beach Boys – June 19, 1992
- Crosby, Stills, Nash & Young – July 5, 1992
- H.O.R.D.E. Festival with Widespread Panic, Blues Traveler, Col. Bruce Hampton and the Aquarium Rescue Unit, Bela Fleck, and the Spin Doctors – August 7, 1992
- Elton John – August 12, 1992
- Red Hot Chili Peppers and Ministry – August 20, 1992
- Metallica- August 31, 1992
- Red Hot Chili Peppers and Ministry – September 1, 1992
- Bonnie Raitt and Lyle Lovett – September 4, 1992
- Bon Jovi – July 17, 1993
- Duran Duran and Terence Trent D'Arby – July 20, 1993
- Stone Temple Pilots – August 10, 1993
- Jethro Tull – August 23, 1993
- Neil Young and Booker T and the MG's – August 29, 1993
- Def Leppard – September 11, 1993
- Aerosmith – October 2, 1993
- Phil Collins – June 4, 1994
- Depeche Mode – June 9, 1994
- Crosby, Stills, Nash & Young – June 24, 1994
- The Smashing Pumpkins – August 13, 1994
- Fleetwood Mac – August 18, 1994
- Aerosmith – September 2, 1994
- Stone Temple Pilots – September 3, 1994
- Tom Petty and the Heartbreakers and Pete Droge – April 15, 1995
- Phish – June 15, 1995
- Queensrÿche and Type O Negative – June 28, 1995
- Elton John – September 1–2, 1995
- Tom Petty and the Heartbreakers and Pete Droge – September 30, 1995
- Jeff Beck and Santana – October 3, 1995
- Nine Inch Nails – October 9, 1995
- Crosby, Stills, Nash & Young and Chicago – May 22, 1996
- Sting – June 28, 1996
- Gloria Estefan – July 18 & 19, 1996
- Neil Young, Jewel, and Ben Folds Five – August 10, 1996
- Scorpions and Alice Cooper – August 12, 1996
- Def Leppard – August 16, 1996
- The Cure – September 6, 1996
- Dave Matthews Band – September 7, 1996
- Tina Turner and Cyndi Lauper – June 14, 1997
- Kansas and Emerson, Lake, and Palmer – June 16, 1997
- Eels, Korn, Tool, Jane's Addiction, Snoop Dogg, Tricky, and The Prodigy – June 27, 1997
- Phish – July 23, 1997
- Rage Against the Machine, Wu-Tang Clan, and Atari Teenage Riot – August 10, 1997
- The Who – August 13, 1997
- Mary J. Blige, Bone Thugs-n-Harmony, Dru Hill, Ginuwine, and Aaliyah – September 10, 1997
- Aerosmith – September 12, 1997
- Fleetwood Mac – November 15, 1997
- Elton John – May 8–9, 1998
- Spice Girls – June 18, 1998
- the Other Ones – June 25, 1998
- Hanson – July 5, 1998
- Backstreet Boys – July 12, 1998
- Van Halen – July 31, 1998
- Phish – August 6, 1998
- Dave Matthews Band – August 20, 1998
- Mudhoney and Pearl Jam – September 1, 1998
- Beastie Boys, Rancid, and DJ Hurricane – September 2, 1998
- Aerosmith – September 5, 1998
- Janet Jackson and Usher – September 16, 1998
- Shania Twain – September 26, 1998
- Aerosmith – October 3, 1998
- Poison and Ratt – July 2, 1999
- Phish – July 3–4, 1999
- Dave Matthews Band – July 28, 1999
- Mötley Crüe and Scorpions, - August 25, 1999
- The Goo Goo Dolls – September 2, 1999
- Rick Springfield – September 10, 1999
- Lenny Kravitz and Pink – September 21, 1999
- Tom Petty and the Heartbreakers – September 24, 1999
- The Cure – May 18, 2000
- A Perfect Circle and Nine Inch Nails – May 20, 2000
- Blink-182, Bad Religion, and Fenix TX – May 21, 2000
- Red Hot Chili Peppers – June 8, 2000
- James Brown – June 10, 2000
- Ozzfest – July 4, 2000
- Poison and The Go-Go's – July 18, 2000
- Santana – July 22, 2000
- Kansas and Yes – July 30, 2000
- Metallica and Corrosion of Conformity – August 5, 2000
- Megadeth and Mötley Crüe – August 25, 2000
- Beastie Boys – September 1, 2000
- Sting – September 5, 2000
- Dave Matthews Band – September 10, 2000
- Britney Spears – September 18, 2000
- Christina Aguilera and Destiny's Child – September 20, 2000
- Everclear, Green Day, Stroke 9, Eve 6, Papa Roach, and Stone Temple Pilots – October 1, 2000
- Counting Crows – October 14, 2000
- Poison – May 31, 2000
- Dido – June 20, 2001
- Styx, Bad Company, Billy Squier, and Joe Stark – June 21, 2001
- Depeche Mode – June 9, 2001
- Tom Petty and the Heartbreakers and Jackson Browne – June 14, 2001
- Allman brothers band, Phil Lesh & Friends, and Susan Tedeschi – August 5, 2001
- Aerosmith and Fuel – September 17, 2001
- 99X Big Day Out- September 21–22, 2001
- Blink-182, Green Day, and Jimmy Eat World – May 18, 2002
- Deep Purple, Dio, and Scorpions – June 19, 2002
- Jamie O'Neal, Kenny Chesney, Montgomery Gentry, and Phil Vassar – July 3, 2002
- Dave Matthews Band and North Mississippi Allstars – July 8, 2002
- Sheryl Crow – July 11, 2002
- Ozzfest – July 28, 2002
- The Strokes and Weezer – July 29, 2002
- Tiger Army and New Found Glory – August 1, 2002
- Lenny Kravitz – August 8, 2002
- Incubus – October 18, 2002
- Pearl Jam April 19, 2003 (It was recorded as one of the bootlegs you can download or order on vinyl from their website)
- Keith Urban and Kenny Chesney – July 3, 2003
- Brooks & Dunn, Rascal Flatts, Brad Paisley, and Jeff Bates – July 25, 2003
- Lollapalooza- August 3, 2003
- Poison – August 6, 2003
- O.A.R. and N.E.R.D – August 29, 2003
- Dave Matthews Band – September 20, 2003
- Blake Shelton and Toby Keith – October 3, 2003
- Supergrass and Radiohead – October 6, 2003
- Styx, Peter Frampton, and Nelson – June 16, 2004
- Tim McGraw – June 17, 2004
- Kenny Chesney and Rascal Flatts – July 23, 2004
- Puddle of Mudd – July 24, 2004
- Dave Matthews Band – July 27, 2004
- Warped Tour – July 28, 2004
- Rush – August 1, 2004
- Alanis Morissette – August 5, 2004
- Projekt Revolution – August 13, 2004
- Brooks & Dunn, Gretchen Wilson, and Montgomery Gentry – October 24, 2004
- Blake Shelton, Leeann Rimes, and Rascal Flatts – May 21, 2005
- Good Charlotte – May 27, 2005
- Dave Matthews Band – July 13, 2005
- Fall Out Boy – August 3, 2005
- Avril Lavigne – August 19, 2005
- Oasis, Jet, and Kasabian – September 27, 2005
- Big & Rich and Brooks & Dunn – October 28, 2005
- Nine Inch Nails, TV on the Radio, and Bauhaus – June 7, 2006
- The Unholy Alliance Tour – June 27, 2006
- Drive-By Truckers, The Black Crowes, and Robert Randolph and the Family Band – July 6, 2006
- Dave Matthews Band and Pat Green – August 15, 2006
- Mary J. Blige – August 27, 2006
- Godsmack and Rob Zombie – August 30, 2006
- Counting Crows – September 3, 2006
- Tom Petty and the Heartbreakers – September 22, 2006
- Crossfade and Staind – September 30, 2006
- Brooks & Dunn – November 10, 2006
- Satellite Party and Chris Cornell – June 2, 2007
- Fall Out Boy, The Academy Is..., Cobra Starship, Paul Wall, and +44 – June 14, 2007
- Warped Tour – July 18, 2007
- Wu-Tang Clan and Pharoahe Monch – August 2, 2007
- Miranda Lambert – August 9, 2007
- Family Values Tour – August 11, 2007
- Alan Jackson, Brooks & Dunn, and Jake Owen – August 26, 2007
- Ratt, Poison, and Vains of Jenna – September 3, 2007
- Kenny Chesney, Pat Green, and Sugarland – September 7–8, 2007
- Brad Paisley, Rodney Atkins, and Taylor Swift – September 20, 2007
- Velvet Revolver, Alice in Chains, and Sparta – October 3, 2007
- Maroon 5, Counting Crows, and Augustana – January 10, 2008
- Liars and Radiohead – May 8, 2008
- RBD – September 24, 2023

== See also ==
- List of contemporary amphitheatres
- Live Nation
