= Mayhem Festival =

Touring metal festival

- Genre: Heavy metal, metalcore, extreme metal, alternative metal, hard rock
- Dates: June–August; October (2024)
- Locations: United States, Canada
- Years active: 2008–15; 2024
- Founders: Kevin Lyman, John Reese
- Website: mayhemfest.com

The Mayhem Festival was a metal festival that takes place during the summer. The inaugural season took place in 2008; the festival later became an annual event across the United States. Most years also included a single date in either Montreal or Toronto, Canada. The tour had been sponsored by the Rockstar Energy Company since the time of its inception. It was assembled by Vans Warped Tour founder Kevin Lyman and John Reese (who was Lyman's partner on the Taste of Chaos tour). On August 2, 2015, Reese confirmed that the 2015 staple of the festival would be the last one. On November 30, 2019, a post to the festival's Instagram account announced the festival's return in 2020. Due to the worldwide COVID-19 pandemic the festival was postponed to 2021, then canceled. In May 2024, it was revealed the festival (now overseen by Ash Avildsen) would return as a one-off event in October of the same year. The festival also planned to resume as a traditional touring festival in the summer of 2025, although it did not happen.

== Bands and style ==
=== Special guests ===
On a nearly annual basis, big-name guests were occasionally brought onto the tour as temporary replacements for the main acts who were forced to cancel a few dates. The first such occurrence was in 2009, when Mushroomhead performed instead of Bullet for My Valentine for three tour dates while they appeared at the European festival Wacken Open Air. In 2010, Avenged Sevenfold was added as an extra performer for two dates only, one of which was on the release date of their fifth album Nightmare. In 2011, Dethklok filled in for Megadeth on the festival's first day, while Testament replaced In Flames on the first two tour dates.

== Stages and events ==
The festival had featured three separate stages each year since the time of its inception: the Main Stage, the Jägermeister Stage, and the third stage that had gone through sponsorship changes. It was known as the Hot Topic Stage from 2008 to 2009. Silver Star briefly replaced the Hot Topic sponsorship in 2010, while Revolver sponsored the stage for 2011. Sumerian Records took over sponsorship in 2012 and 2013, and a fourth stage was added for the 2013 festival sponsored by Musicians Institute The Main Stage featured four bands each year, while the side stages typically featured four or five each. A large selection of Battle of the Bands winners were chosen to open the Jägermeister Stage upon the various dates each year, one per venue.

Each year, the festival had the Metal Mulisha as a side attraction for the fans to watch. Most bands that participated in the tour had a public meet-and-greet at scheduled times throughout the day, upon each tour date. Rockstar Energy Drink, the festival's most prominent sponsor, allowed fans to enjoy numerous free samples of its new products every year.

== Tours by year ==
- Mayhem Festival 2008
- Mayhem Festival 2009
- Mayhem Festival 2010
- Mayhem Festival 2011
- Mayhem Festival 2012
- Mayhem Festival 2013
- Mayhem Festival 2014
- Mayhem Festival 2015
- Mayhem Festival 2024

For a list of lineups by year, see List of Mayhem Festival lineups by year.

== See also ==
- Ozzfest
- Uproar Festival
