= Jiffy Lube Live =

Outdoor amphitheater in Bristow, Virginia, US

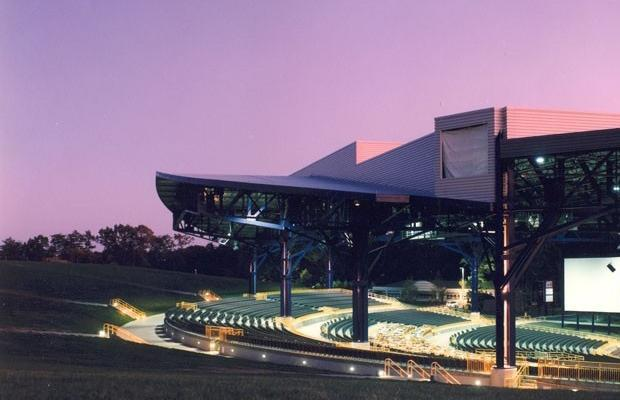
- Side view of venue from the lawn area (c. 2007)
- Interactive map of Jiffy Lube Live
- Former names: Nissan Pavilion (1995–2010)
- Address: 7800 Cellar Door Dr; Gainesville, VA 20136-1148
- Location: Washington metropolitan area
- Coordinates: 38.7854092°N 77.5902231°W
- Owner: Live Nation
- Capacity: 25,262

Construction
- Opened: June 6, 1995

Jiffy Lube Live (originally known as the Nissan Pavilion) in Gainesville, Virginia, is an outdoor amphitheater in suburban Prince William County, about 35 miles west of Washington, D.C. Owned and operated by Live Nation, the amphitheater can seat 25,262: 10,444 in reserved seats and 14,818 on the lawn.

== History ==
Development of the venue was a result of work by Cellar Door Productions, a prominent concert promoter in the area at the time. Two separate controversies led to the opening of the venue. The community had voiced complaints regarding the Grateful Dead shows at nearby RFK Stadium, a circumstance similar to the creation of Shoreline Amphitheatre in Mountain View, California 9 years prior. Meanwhile, The Walt Disney Company was in the planning stages of its proposed Disney's America theme park in the area. Locals were angered at the proposed theme park. As a result, authorities granted permits for the pavilion instead. The location was decided due to proximity to the interstate as well as the capacity of the proposed facility to handle large crowds over multiple days. The amphitheater opened in June 1995 with a show including The Village People, Laura Branigan, Rose Royce, and The Trammps.

On July 24, 2004, the American hard rock band Kiss recorded their concert here for the live album Rock the Nation Live! (DVD).

Then-Senator Barack Obama held a rally for his 2008 presidential campaign at the venue on June 5, 2008.

On January 8, 2010, the name of the venue was changed from "Nissan Pavilion" to "Jiffy Lube Live" as a result of a business agreement between Live Nation and Jiffy Lube Washington Area Co-op Inc.

In February 2011 the venue posted to its website that it would strictly enforce its existing no-tailgating rule for its parking lots before and after concerts in conjunction with the Prince William County Police Department. Organizers cited safety concerns as reasons for the ban, though they planned to continue to sell alcohol inside the venue. In January 2012 the venue posted that tailgating would be returning with a set of rules posted on their website.

== Performers ==
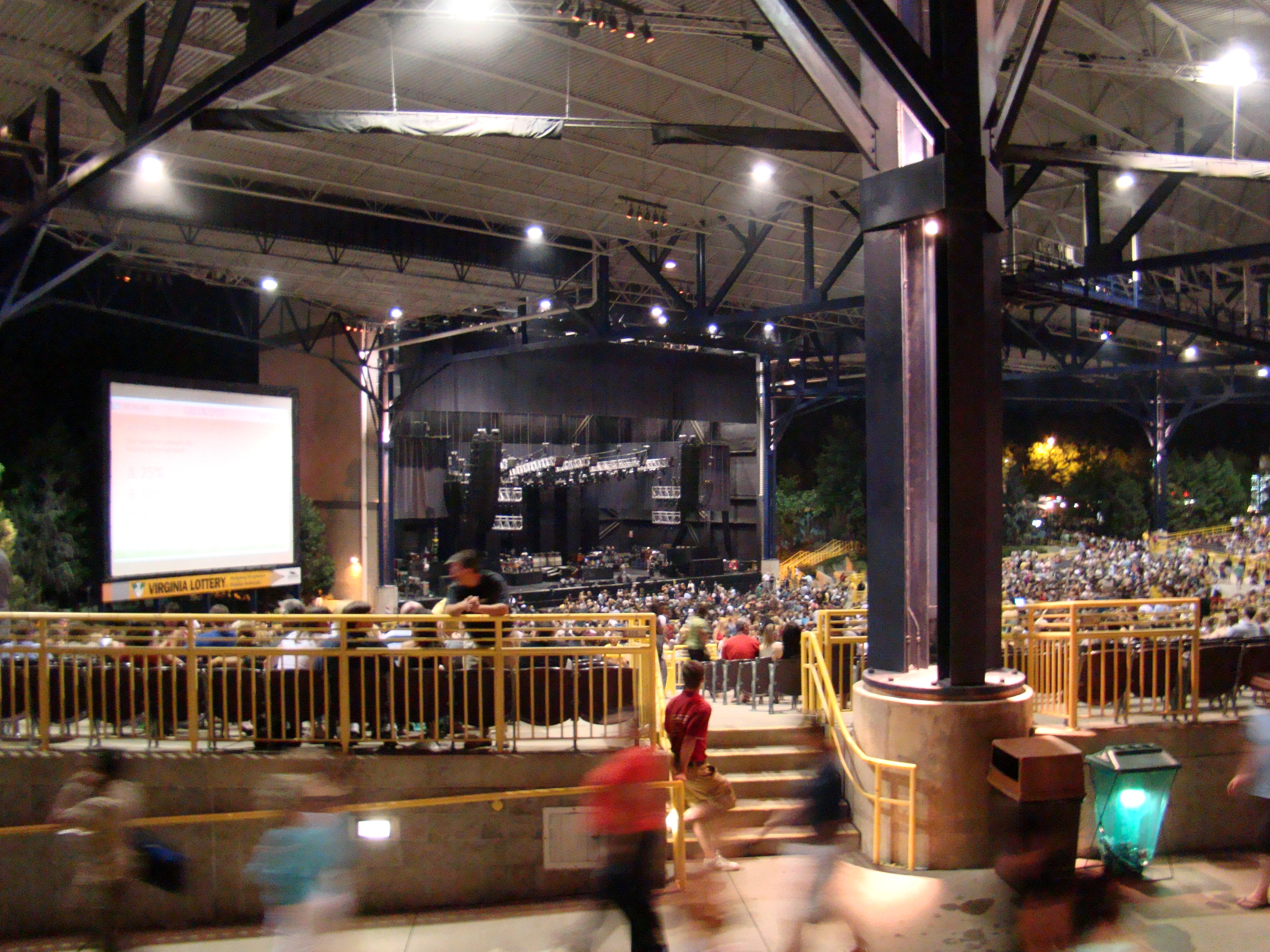
Reserved seating before a Slipknot concert, 2008

Since its opening, Jiffy Lube Live has hosted a variety of musicians and bands. Annual events included Jimmy Buffett, WMZQfest and the Mayhem Festival. 2008 featured LeRoi Moore's last performance with the Dave Matthews Band before his death later in the year; The concert was later released as Live Trax Vol. 14. Other events include a variety of festivals such as Farm Aid and Ozzfest, along with co-headliners and solo acts. Other notable musical acts that have performed at Jiffy Lube Live include Widespread Panic, Phish, Ozzy Osbourne, and Rush. In addition, some high schools in Prince William County and Fauquier County hold their graduation ceremonies there each June. In August 2012 & 2014, Linkin Park held concerts in the venue & was supposed to perform again in August 2017 but later cancelled following the death of frontman Chester Bennington. In July 2015, Nicki Minaj held a Pinkprint tour concert in the venue. In July 2019, Iron Maiden performed as part of their Legacy of the Beast World Tour and Run for Your Lives World Tour. In July 2023, Matchbox Twenty performed at the venue after the initial tour date was postponed, achieving high turnout.

== See also ==
- List of contemporary amphitheatres
