= Ruoff Music Center =

Amphitheater in Noblesville, Indiana

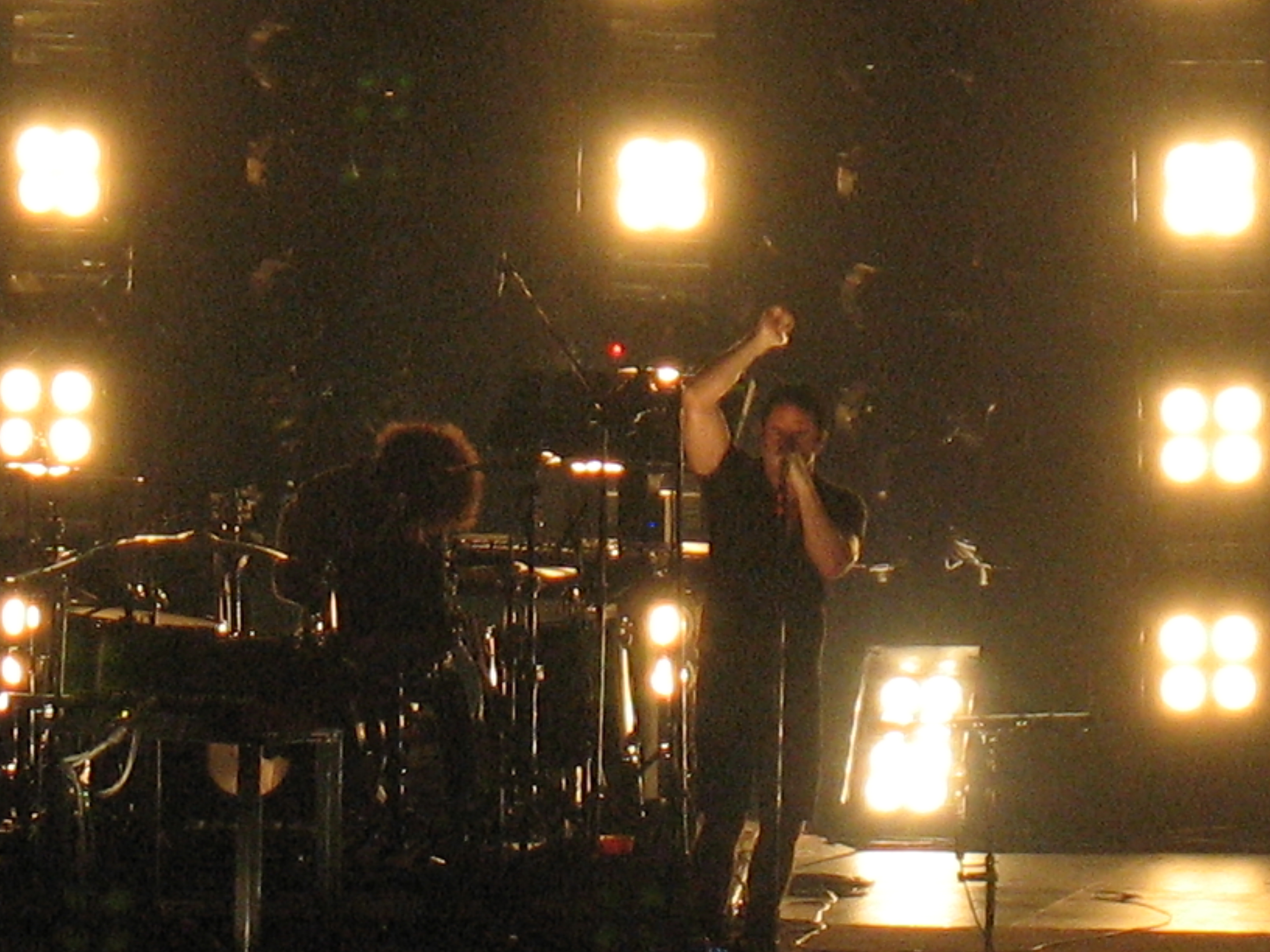
- A Nine Inch Nails concert in 2009
- Interactive map of Ruoff Music Center
- Former names: Deer Creek Music Center (1989–2001); Verizon Wireless Music Center (2001–2011); Klipsch Music Center (2011–2017); Ruoff Home Mortgage Music Center (2017–2019)
- Address: 12880 East 146th Street
- Location: Noblesville, Indiana
- Coordinates: 40.00516°N 85.931061°W
- Owner: Live Nation
- Seating type: reserved, lawn
- Capacity: 24,790
- Type: Outdoor amphitheatre

Construction
- Opened: 1989

Website
- livenation.com

The Ruoff Music Center is an outdoor amphitheatre located in Noblesville, Indiana, United States. It was originally named Deer Creek Music Center and subsequently Verizon Wireless Music Center, Klipsch Music Center, and Ruoff Home Mortgage Music Center. It is the largest outdoor music venue in the Indianapolis metropolitan area of central Indiana, with 6,147 seats under a pavilion and 18,000 general admission lawn seats. It is used mainly for large concerts, but is also frequently a host for high school graduations and political rallies.

== Concerts and music festivals ==
The Ruoff Music Center is an open-air concert venue capable of hosting live, high-profile concerts and outdoor music festivals. It opened in 1989, at a site along Sand Creek, just north of exit 210 on Interstate 69, near the junction of former State Road 238 (at the time also known as Greenfield Avenue; now rebuilt and renamed as Southeastern Parkway), 146th Street and Boden Road. In 1997, Sunshine Promotions, which built the amphitheater, was acquired by SFX; corporate successor Live Nation Entertainment continues to own it. On December 19, 2018, Pollstar, a trade publication for the concert industry, ranked the center as the world's top concert amphitheater based on annual ticket sales in 2018. During the previous year, the venue ranked third among the list of the world's top concert amphitheaters. In 2021, the venue ranked second on the same list. In 2023, with the return of Farm Aid, Ruoff was ranked the top amphitheater worldwide for tickets sold and third for gross sales.

The Grateful Dead played at the venue (when it was still Deer Creek) fourteen times between 1989 and 1995.

=== 2006–2007: Possible sale ===
On December 28, 2006, Live Nation, the owner of the music center, confirmed they were putting up for sale the 203 acres (0.82 km^{2}) of land that constitutes the amphitheater complex, then known as the Verizon Wireless Music Center. In 2011, Klipsch Group, Inc., whose international headquarters are located nearby, acquired naming rights to the venue. The venue remained under the ownership of Live Nation and continued to draw major acts during the summer months.

=== 2017: Naming rights change ===
On September 27, 2017, Live Nation announced that the music center had acquired a new naming rights sponsor from Ruoff Home Mortgage after the previous 5-year contract with Klipsch expired in 2016 and left the venue without a title sponsor for a year. The venue officially became the Ruoff Home Mortgage Music Center simultaneously with the announcement. On December 5, 2019, it was announced that the name of the music center would be shortened to Ruoff Music Center.

== See also ==
- Live Nation
- List of contemporary amphitheatres
- List of music venues in the United States
