= First Financial Credit Union Amphitheater =

Outdoor amphitheater in Albuquerque, New Mexico

- Interactive map of First Financial Credit Union Amphitheater
- Former names: Mesa del Sol Amphitheater (2000); ABQ Journal Pavilion (2001–2010); The Pavilion (2010–2013); Isleta Amphitheater (2013-2025)
- Address: 5601 University Blvd SE; Albuquerque, NM 87105
- Coordinates: 34.998148°N 106.630436°W
- Owner: Live Nation Entertainment
- Seating type: Reserved seating and lawn seating
- Capacity: 12,000 (2000-09); 15,000 (2009-present)
- Type: Amphitheatre

Construction
- Opened: February 2000
- Expanded: 2009

Website
- Isleta Amphitheater (Live Nation)

First Financial Credit Union Amphitheater is an outdoor amphitheater, located in Albuquerque, New Mexico, United States.

The amphitheater opened in February 2000 as the Mesa del Sol Amphitheater. This was a part of Mesa del Sol, a planned community, currently under development in Albuquerque. In December 2000, the local newspaper Albuquerque Journal purchased naming rights and the amphitheater was thus known as ABQ Journal Pavilion (or simply Journal Pavilion). During the 2009 concert season, the venue's lawn area was expanded, increasing the capacity from 12,000 to 15,000. In March 2010, Hard Rock Hotel and Casino Albuquerque purchased naming rights and the venue became known as The Pavilion. In 2013, the venue changed its name again, to Isleta Amphitheater, named after Pueblo of Isleta. In 2026, First Financial Credit Union purchased naming rights and the venue became known as First Financial Credit Union Amphitheater.

== See also ==
- List of contemporary amphitheatres
- Live Nation
