= The Meadows Music Theatre =

Outdoor/indoor theatre in Hartford, Connecticut

Coordinates: 41.779233°N 72.669196°W

- The Meadows
- Interactive map of The Meadows Music Theatre
- Former names: Connecticut Centre for the Performing Arts (planning/construction); Meadows Music Theatre (1994–2000; 2026–present) ctnow.com Meadows Music Theatre (2000–2005); New England Dodge Music Center (2005–2009); Comcast Theatre (2009–2013); Xfinity Theatre (2013–2025)
- Location: Hartford, Connecticut
- Owner: City of Hartford
- Operator: Live Nation
- Seating type: reserved, lawn
- Capacity: 30,000 (7,500 indoor)
- Type: Outdoor amphitheatre (summer); Indoor theatre (fall/winter)
- Public transit: : 34, 38

Construction
- Opened: 1994

Website
- www.meadowsmusictheatre.com

The Meadows Music Theatre (formerly known as the Xfinity Theatre) is an outdoor/indoor amphitheatre located in Hartford, Connecticut, owned by Live Nation. The capacity of the venue is 30,000. The indoor area holds 7,500 and the outdoor lawn area holds an additional 22,500 during the summer months making it one of the largest amphitheatres in the country. Live Nation predecessor SFX bought the theatre in 1997.

== Notable performances ==
- The Spice Girls played a show on July 3, 1998, during their Spiceworld Tour.
- Britney Spears performed to a sold out crowd on her Oops!... I Did It Again World Tour on June 21, 2000. It was the second show of the tour.
- On June 6, 2001 Aerosmith kicked off the North American leg of their Just Push Play tour, with the show airing live on VH1.
- At the 2013 Funny or Die: Oddball Comedy Festival comedic headliner Dave Chappelle refused to perform his routine after he experienced what he considered to be heckling from audience members. He instead remained on stage for the minimum amount of time his contract required him to and smoked cigarettes while taunting the audience. He said things such as "if North Korea were to drop the bomb tomorrow, he would hope it lands in Hartford, Connecticut." He returned for an unannounced appearance at the festival the next year to apologize to the crowd.
- On September 22, 2018 the annual Farm Aid charity concert was held at Xfinity featuring Willie Nelson, Neil Young, John Mellencamp, Dave Matthews with Tim Reynolds, Sturgill Simpson, Kacey Musgraves and others. After the COVID-19 pandemic sidelined live performances in 2020 it returned to Hartford in 2021.

== See also ==
- List of contemporary amphitheatres
- Live Nation
