= All Is One Tour =

2002 concert tour by Santana

- Tour by Santana
- The cover of a tour book for the North American tours.
- Start date: March 15, 2002
- End date: October 12, 2002
- Legs: 3
- No. of shows: 37 in North America; 20 in Europe; 57 in total

Santana concert chronology
- Supernatural Tour (1999–2000); All Is One Tour (2002); Shaman Tour (2002–04)

The All Is One Tour was the thirty-first concert tour by American rock group Santana in 2002. According to Billboard, the North American tours grossed $16,821,175, 426,431 out of 640,106 tickets were sold, and 7 concerts sold out.

== Tour band ==
- Tony Lindsay – lead vocals
- Andy Vargas – lead vocals
- Carlos Santana – lead guitar, percussion, vocals
- Myron Dove – rhythm guitar
- Chester D. Thompson – keyboards
- Benny Rietveld – bass guitar
- Dennis Chambers – drums
- William Ortiz – trumpet
- Jeff Cresman – trombone
- Karl Perazzo – timbales, percussion, vocals
- Raul Rekow – congas, bongos, percussion, vocals

== Set list ==
An average set list of this tour is as follows:

1. "Day of Celebration" (Carlos Santana, Chester D. Thompson, Tony Lindsay)
2. "Love of My Life" (Santana, Dave Matthews)
3. "Put Your Lights On" (Erik Schrody)
4. "Victory Is Won" (Santana)
5. "Maria Maria" (Santana, Karl Perazzo, Raul Rekow, Wyclef Jean, Jerry Duplessis)
6. "Africa Bamba" (Santana, Touré Kunda, Perazzo)
7. "Aye Aye Aye" (Michael Shrieve, Santana, Perazzo, Rekow)
8. "Spiritual" (John Coltrane)
9. "(Da Le) Yaleo" (Santana, Shakara Mutela, Christian Polloni)
10. "Foo Foo" (Yvon André, Roger Eugène, Yves Joseph, Hermann Nau, Claude Jean)
11. "Adouma" (Angélique Kidjo, Jean Hebrail)
12. "Make Somebody Happy" (Santana, Alex Ligertwood)
13. "Right On Be Free" (Charles "Chuck" Griffin, Bernice Cole)
14. "Get It in Your Soul"
15. "Apache" (Jerry Lordan)
16. "Smooth" (Itaal Shur, Rob Thomas)
17. "Dame Tu Amor" (Abraham Quintanilla, Ricky Vela, Richard Brooks)
18. "Black Magic Woman" (Peter Green)
19. "Gypsy Queen" (Gábor Szabó)

Encore

20. "Oye Como Va" (Tito Puente)
21. "Jin-go-lo-ba" (Babatunde Olatunji)

== Tour dates ==
=== U.S. leg (March 15 – April 2) ===
List of tour dates with date, city, country, venue
Date (2002)	City	Country	Venue
March 21	Tampa	United States	Ice Palace
March 22	West Palm Beach	United States	Mars Music Amphitheatre
March 23	Orlando	United States	TD Waterhouse Centre
March 25	Atlanta	United States	Philips Arena
March 27	Greenville	United States	BI-LO Center
March 29	Raleigh	United States	Raleigh Entertainment & Sports Arena
March 30	Charlotte	United States	Charlotte Coliseum
April 1	Washington, D.C.	United States	MCI Center
April 2	Hampton	United States	Hampton Coliseum

=== European leg (May 16 – June 16) ===
List of tour dates with date, city, country, venue
Date (2002)	City	Country	Venue
May 16	Copenhagen	Denmark	Parken Stadium
May 17 (Note: The concert on May 17 was a part of Rock am Ring.)	Nürburg	Germany	Nürburgring
May 18 (Note: The concert on May 18 was a part of Rock im Park.)	Nuremberg	Germany	Frankenstadion
May 20	Arnhem	Netherlands	GelreDome
May 21	Paris	France	Palais Omnisports de Paris-Bercy
May 22	Lyon	France	Halle Tony Garnier
May 24	Dortmund	Germany	Westfalenhallen
May 26	Hanover	Germany	Niedersachsenstadion
May 28	Berlin	Germany	Waldbühne
May 30	Stuttgart	Germany	Hanns-Martin-Schleyer-Halle
May 31	Leipzig	Germany	Arena Leipzig
June 2	Zürich	Switzerland	Letzigrund
June 4	Budapest	Hungary	Kisstadion
June 5	Vienna	Austria	Schönbrunn Palace
June 7	Dublin	Ireland	Marlay Park
June 9	London	England	Crystal Palace National Sports Centre
June 12	Lisbon	Portugal	Pavilhão Atlântico
June 14	Marseille	France	Le Dôme de Marseille
June 15	Turin	Italy	PalaStampa
June 16 (Note: The concert on June 16 was a part of the Heineken Jammin' Festival.)	Bologna	Italy	Autodromo Enzo e Dino Ferrari

=== North American leg (July 31 – October 12) ===
List of tour dates with date, city, country, venue
Date (2002)	City	Country	Venue
July 31	Virginia Beach	United States	GTE Virginia Beach Amphitheater
August 2	Columbia	United States	Merriweather Post Pavilion
August 3	Hartford	United States	Meadows Music Theatre
August 4	Camden	United States	Tweeter Center at the Waterfront
August 6	Mansfield	United States	Tweeter Center for the Performing Arts
August 7	Holmdel Township	United States	PNC Bank Arts Center
August 9	Wantagh	United States	Tommy Hilfiger at Jones Beach Theater
August 10	Wantagh	United States	Tommy Hilfiger at Jones Beach Theater
August 11	Saratoga Springs	United States	Saratoga Performing Arts Center
August 13	Montreal	Canada	Centre Molson
August 14	Toronto	Canada	Molson Amphitheatre
August 16	Cuyahoga Falls	United States	Blossom Music Center
August 17	Noblesville	United States	Deer Creek Music Center
August 19	Clarkston	United States	Pine Knob Music Theatre
August 21	Grand Rapids	United States	Van Andel Arena
August 23	Tinley Park	United States	Tweeter Center
August 24	Milwaukee	United States	Marcus Amphitheater
August 25	Saint Paul	United States	Xcel Energy Center
September 28 (Note: The concert on September 28 was a part of the Andre Agassi Grand Slam for Children.)	Las Vegas	United States	MGM Grand Garden Arena
September 29	Las Vegas	United States	Rain in the Desert
October 1	Albuquerque	United States	ABQ Journal Pavilion
October 2	Phoenix	United States	Cricket Pavilion
October 4	Concord	United States	Chronicle Pavilion
October 5	Mountain View	United States	Shoreline Amphitheatre
October 8	Santa Barbara	United States	Santa Barbara Bowl
October 9	Santa Barbara	United States	Santa Barbara Bowl
October 11	Chula Vista	United States	Coors Amphitheatre
October 12	Los Angeles	United States	Hollywood Bowl

== Box office score data ==
List of box office score data with date, city, venue, attendance, gross, references
Date (2002)	City	Venue	Attendance	Gross	Ref(s)
March 22	West Palm Beach, United States	Mars Music Amphitheatre	10,843 / 19,271	$454,926	
March 23	Orlando, United States	TD Waterhouse Centre	6,462 / 17,127	$302,877	
March 27	Greenville, United States	BI-LO Center	6,746 / 10,500	$217,361	
April 1	Washington, D.C., United States	MCI Center	10,842 / 18,871	$569,951	
August 7	Holmdel Township, United States	PNC Bank Arts Center	10,394 / 16,988	$438,656	
August 9	Wantagh, United States	Tommy Hilfiger at Jones Beach Theater	21,286 / 28,058	$1,081,297	
August 10	Wantagh, United States	Tommy Hilfiger at Jones Beach Theater	21,286 / 28,058	$1,081,297	
October 1	Albuquerque, United States	ABQ Journal Pavilion	12,241 / 12,241	$422,534	
October 4	Concord, United States	Chronicle Pavilion	12,606 / 12,627	$442,699	
October 5	Mountain View, United States	Shoreline Amphitheatre	20,154 / 22,000	$692,449	
October 8	Santa Barbara, United States	Santa Barbara Bowl	9,053 / 9,053	$462,508	
October 9	Santa Barbara, United States	Santa Barbara Bowl	9,053 / 9,053	$462,508	
October 11	Chula Vista, United States	Coors Amphitheatre	10,834 / 18,992	$490,015	
October 12	Los Angeles, United States	Hollywood Bowl	16,737 / 16,737	$919,335	
TOTAL			148,198 / 202,915 (73%)	$6,494,608	
