= Supernatural Tour =

1999–2000 concert tour by Santana

- Tour by Santana
- The cover of a tour book for the Japanese tour in April 2000.
- Associated album: Supernatural
- Start date: February 12, 1999
- End date: October 28, 2000
- Legs: 6
- No. of shows: 124 in North America; 27 in Europe; 6 in Asia; 157 in total
- Box office: $21.234 million ($38.77 million in 2024 dollars)

Santana concert chronology
- Dance of the Rainbow Serpent Tour (1995–1998); Supernatural Tour (1999–2000); All Is One Tour (2002)

The Supernatural Tour was the thirtieth concert tour by American rock band Santana, supporting their 1999 album Supernatural.

== Live releases ==
Live material from this tour has appeared on the following releases:

- "Smooth" from February 25, 2000, at the Grand Olympic Auditorium in Los Angeles was used in the 2001 film All Access: Front Row. Backstage. Live!.
- Most of the set on April 8, 2000, at the Pasadena Civic Auditorium in Pasadena, California was featured on the 2000 video Supernatural Live: An Evening with Carlos Santana and Friends.

== Touring band ==
- Carlos Santana – lead guitar, percussion, vocals
- Chester D. Thompson – keyboards
- Benny Rietveld – bass guitar
- Karl Perazzo – timbales, percussion, vocals
- Raul Rekow – congas, bongos, percussion, vocals
- Rodney Holmes – drums (through June 14, 2000)
- Billy Johnson – drums (beginning July 20, 2000)
- Tony Lindsay – lead vocals
- Andy Vargas – lead vocals (beginning September 1999)
- Vorriece Cooper – vocals
- William Ortiz – trumpet (beginning May 18, 2000)
- Jeff Cresman – trombone (beginning May 18, 2000)

== Typical set lists ==
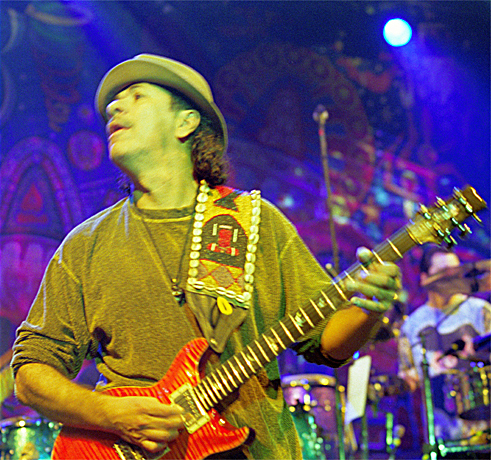
Carlos Santana at the Muffathalle in Munich, Germany on January 21, 2000

1999
1. "Spiritual" (John Coltrane)
2. "(Da Le) Yaleo" (Santana, Shakara Mutela, Christian Polloni)
3. "Put Your Lights On" (Erik Schrody)
4. "Day of Celebration" (Santana, Chester D. Thompson, Tony Lindsay)
5. "Smooth" (Itaal Shur, Rob Thomas)
6. "Victory Is Won" (Santana)
7. "Everybody's Everything" (Santana, Milton Brown, Tyrone Moss)
8. "Maria Maria" (Santana, Karl Perazzo, Raul Rekow, Wyclef Jean, Jerry Duplessis)
9. "Love of My Life" (Santana, Dave Matthews)
10. "Europa (Earth's Cry Heaven's Smile)" (Tom Coster, Santana)
11. "Bacalao con Pan" (Raul Valdes)
12. "Make Somebody Happy" (Santana, Alex Ligertwood)
13. "Get It in Your Soul"
14. "Black Magic Woman" (Peter Green)
15. "Gypsy Queen" (Gábor Szabó)
16. "Oye Como Va" (Tito Puente)
17. "Jin-go-lo-ba" (Babatunde Olatunji)
2000
1. "Spiritual" (Coltrane)
2. "(Da Le) Yaleo" (Santana, Mutela, Polloni)
3. "Love of My Life" (Santana, Matthews)
4. "Put Your Lights On" (Schrody)
5. "Day of Celebration" (Santana, Thompson, Lindsay)
6. "Victory Is Won" (Santana)
7. "Maria Maria" (Santana, Perazzo, Rekow, Jean, Duplessis)
8. "Migra" (Santana, Rachid Taha, Lindsay)
9. "Africa Bamba" (Santana, Touré Kunda, Perazzo)
10. "Supernatural Thing" (Haras Fyre, Gwen Guthrie)
11. "Corazón Espinado" (Fher Olvera)
12. "Bacalao con Pan" (Valdes)
13. "Make Somebody Happy" (Santana, Ligertwood)
14. "Get It in Your Soul"
15. "Black Magic Woman" (Green)
16. "Gypsy Queen" (Szabó)
17. "Oye Como Va" (Puente)

Encore

18. "Apache" (Jerry Lordan)
19. "Smooth" (Shur, Thomas)
20. "Dame Tu Amor" (Abraham Quintanilla, Ricky Vela, Richard Brooks)
21. "Jin-go-lo-ba" (Olatunji)

== Tour dates ==
=== North American leg (February 12, 1999 – January 1, 2000) ===
List of tour dates with date, city, country, venue
Date	City	Country	Venue	Supporting act(s)
February 12, 1999	Las Vegas	United States	The Joint	—N/a
February 13, 1999	Las Vegas	United States	The Joint	—N/a
February 14, 1999	Las Vegas	United States	The Joint	—N/a
April 16, 1999	San Francisco	United States	The Fillmore	—N/a
April 17, 1999	San Francisco	United States	The Fillmore	—N/a
April 18, 1999	San Francisco	United States	The Fillmore	—N/a
April 22, 1999	Tunica Resorts	United States	Bluesville Showcase Nightclub	—N/a
April 23, 1999	New Orleans	United States	Municipal Auditorium	—N/a
April 24, 1999 (Note: The concert on April 24, 1999 was a part of the New Orleans Jazz & Heritage Festival.)	New Orleans	United States	Fair Grounds Race Course	—N/a
May 20, 1999	Philadelphia	United States	Veterans Stadium	Dave Matthews Band; The Roots
May 21, 1999	Philadelphia	United States	Veterans Stadium	Dave Matthews Band; The Roots
May 22, 1999	Philadelphia	United States	Veterans Stadium	Dave Matthews Band; The Roots
May 25, 1999	East Rutherford	United States	Giants Stadium	Dave Matthews Band; The Roots
May 26, 1999	East Rutherford	United States	Giants Stadium	Dave Matthews Band; The Roots
May 28, 1999	Wallingford	United States	SNET Oakdale Theatre	Dave Matthews Band; The Roots
May 29, 1999	Foxborough	United States	Foxboro Stadium	Dave Matthews Band; The Roots
May 30, 1999	Foxborough	United States	Foxboro Stadium	Dave Matthews Band; The Roots
June 2, 1999	Canandaigua	United States	Finger Lakes Performing Arts Center	—N/a
June 4, 1999	Holmdel Township	United States	PNC Bank Arts Center	Ozomatli
June 5, 1999	Wantagh	United States	Jones Beach Amphitheater	Ozomatli
June 6, 1999	Saratoga Springs	United States	Saratoga Performing Arts Center	Ozomatli
June 8, 1999	Montreal	Canada	Molson Centre	Ozomatli
June 9, 1999	Toronto	Canada	Molson Amphitheatre	Ozomatli
June 11, 1999	Columbus	United States	Polaris Amphitheater	Ozomatli
June 12, 1999	Clarkston	United States	Pine Knob Music Theatre	Ozomatli
June 13, 1999	Cuyahoga Falls	United States	Blossom Music Center	Ozomatli
June 14, 1999	Columbia	United States	Merriweather Post Pavilion	Ozomatli
June 17, 1999	Cincinnati	United States	J. Ralph Corbett Pavilion	Ozomatli
June 18, 1999	Noblesville	United States	Deer Creek Music Center	Ozomatli
June 19, 1999	Tinley Park	United States	New World Music Theatre	Ozomatli
June 20, 1999	Minneapolis	United States	Cyrus Northrop Memorial Auditorium	Ozomatli
July 29, 1999	The Woodlands	United States	Cynthia Woods Mitchell Pavilion	Maná; Ozomatli
July 30, 1999	The Woodlands	United States	Cynthia Woods Mitchell Pavilion	Maná; Ozomatli
July 31, 1999	San Antonio	United States	Alamodome	Maná; Ozomatli
August 1, 1999	Dallas	United States	Starplex Amphitheatre	Maná; Ozomatli
August 3, 1999	El Paso	United States	Don Haskins Center	Maná; Ozomatli
August 5, 1999	Phoenix	United States	America West Arena	Maná; Ozomatli
August 6, 1999	Tucson	United States	Pima County Fairgrounds	Maná; Ozomatli
August 7, 1999	Chula Vista	United States	Coors Amphitheatre	Maná; Ozomatli
August 8, 1999	Chula Vista	United States	Coors Amphitheatre	Maná; Ozomatli
August 11, 1999	Anaheim	United States	Arrowhead Pond of Anaheim	Maná; Ozomatli
August 12, 1999	Anaheim	United States	Arrowhead Pond of Anaheim	Maná; Ozomatli
August 13, 1999	Anaheim	United States	Arrowhead Pond of Anaheim	Maná; Ozomatli
August 14, 1999	Anaheim	United States	Arrowhead Pond of Anaheim	Maná; Ozomatli
August 15, 1999	Mountain View	United States	Shoreline Amphitheatre	Maná; Ozomatli
August 17, 1999	Concord	United States	Concord Pavilion	Maná; Ozomatli
August 18, 1999	Sacramento	United States	ARCO Arena	Maná; Ozomatli
August 20, 1999	George	United States	The Gorge Amphitheatre	Maná; Ozomatli
August 21, 1999	Portland	United States	Portland Meadows	Maná; Ozomatli
August 22, 1999	Eugene	United States	Cuthbert Amphitheater	Maná; Ozomatli
August 24, 1999	Nampa	United States	Idaho Center Amphitheater	Maná; Ozomatli
August 27, 1999	Morrison	United States	Red Rocks Amphitheatre	Maná; Ozomatli
August 28, 1999	Morrison	United States	Red Rocks Amphitheatre	Maná; Ozomatli
October 1, 1999	Santa Barbara	United States	Santa Barbara Bowl	Ozomatli
October 2, 1999	Santa Barbara	United States	Santa Barbara Bowl	Ozomatli
October 3, 1999	Los Angeles	United States	Hollywood Bowl	Ozomatli
October 4, 1999	San Diego	United States	Balboa Park	Ozomatli
October 7, 1999	Kansas City	United States	Memorial Hall	Ozomatli
October 8, 1999	St. Louis	United States	Fox Theatre	Ozomatli
October 9, 1999	Memphis	United States	Mud Island Amphitheatre	Ozomatli
October 10, 1999	Knoxville	United States	World's Fair Park	Ozomatli
October 12, 1999	Virginia Beach	United States	GTE Virginia Beach Amphitheater	Ozomatli
October 14, 1999	Myrtle Beach	United States	Palace Theatre	Ozomatli
October 15, 1999	Atlanta	United States	Chastain Park Amphitheater	Ozomatli
October 16, 1999	Orlando	United States	Hard Rock Live	Ozomatli
October 17, 1999	West Palm Beach	United States	Coral Sky Amphitheatre at the South Florida Fairgrounds	Ozomatli
November 30, 1999	Monterrey	Mexico	Auditorio Coca-Cola	Maná
December 1, 1999	Monterrey	Mexico	Auditorio Coca-Cola	Maná
December 3, 1999	Guadalajara	Mexico	Plaza de Toros Nuevo Progreso	Maná
December 4, 1999	Guadalajara	Mexico	Plaza de Toros Nuevo Progreso	Maná
December 7, 1999	Monterrey	Mexico	Auditorio Coca-Cola	Maná
December 10, 1999	Mexico City	Mexico	Foro Sol	Maná
December 30, 1999	Las Vegas	United States	The Joint	—N/a
December 31, 1999	Las Vegas	United States	The Joint	—N/a
January 1, 2000	Las Vegas	United States	The Joint	—N/a

=== European leg (January 21–29, 2000) ===
List of tour dates with date, city, country, venue
Date	City	Country	Venue	Supporting act(s)
January 21, 2000	Munich	Germany	Muffathalle	—N/a
January 26, 2000	London	England	The Tabernacle	—N/a
January 29, 2000	Paris	France	Maison de la Radio	—N/a

=== North American leg (February 25 – April 19, 2000) ===
List of tour dates with date, city, country, venue
Date	City	Country	Venue	Supporting act(s)
February 25, 2000	Los Angeles	United States	Grand Olympic Auditorium	—N/a
April 8, 2000	Pasadena	United States	Pasadena Civic Auditorium	—N/a
April 19, 2000	Kahului	United States	Maui Arts & Cultural Center	—N/a

=== Japanese leg (April 22–28, 2000) ===
List of tour dates with date, city, country, venue
Date	City	Country	Venue	Supporting act(s)
April 22, 2000	Tokyo	Japan	Hall A	—N/a
April 23, 2000	Tokyo	Japan	Hall A	—N/a
April 24, 2000	Yokohama	Japan	Kanagawa Kenmin Hall	—N/a
April 26, 2000	Nagoya	Japan	Aichi Kinro Kaikan	—N/a
April 27, 2000	Osaka	Japan	Festival Hall	—N/a
April 28, 2000	Tokyo	Japan	Nippon Budokan	—N/a

=== European leg (May 18 – June 14, 2000) ===
List of tour dates with date, city, country, venue
Date	City	Country	Venue	Supporting act(s)
May 18, 2000	Madrid	Spain	Estadio Olímpico de Madrid	—N/a
May 19, 2000	Zaragoza	Spain	Pabellón Príncipe Felipe	—N/a
May 20, 2000	Barcelona	Spain	Palau Sant Jordi	—N/a
May 22, 2000	Zürich	Switzerland	Hallenstadion	—N/a
May 23, 2000	Milan	Italy	FilaForum	—N/a
May 25, 2000	Bologna	Italy	PalaMalaguti	—N/a
May 26, 2000	Vienna	Austria	Wiener Stadthalle	—N/a
May 27, 2000	Munich	Germany	Olympiahalle München	—N/a
May 29, 2000	Paris	France	Palais Omnisports de Paris-Bercy	—N/a
May 30, 2000	Brussels	Belgium	Forest National	—N/a
May 31, 2000	Rotterdam	Netherlands	Sportpaleis	—N/a
June 2, 2000	Oberhausen	Germany	Arena Oberhausen	—N/a
June 3, 2000	Hamburg	Germany	Freilichtbühne	—N/a
June 4, 2000	Berlin	Germany	Kindl-Bühne Wuhlheide	—N/a
June 6, 2000	Stuttgart	Germany	Hanns-Martin-Schleyer-Halle	—N/a
June 7, 2000	Stuttgart	Germany	Hanns-Martin-Schleyer-Halle	—N/a
June 8, 2000	Hanover	Germany	Preussag Arena	—N/a
June 9, 2000 (Note: The concert on June 9, 2000 was a part of Rock im Park.)	Nuremberg	Germany	Frankenstadion	—N/a
June 10, 2000 (Note: The concert on June 10, 2000 was a part of Rock am Ring.)	Nürburg	Germany	Nürburgring	—N/a
June 12, 2000	Manchester	England	Manchester Evening News Arena	—N/a
June 13, 2000	Solihull	England	NEC Arena	—N/a
June 14, 2000	London	England	Wembley Arena	—N/a

=== North American leg (July 20 – October 28, 2000) ===
List of tour dates with date, city, country, venue
Date	City	Country	Venue	Supporting act(s)
July 20, 2000	West Palm Beach	United States	Mars Music Amphitheatre	Macy Gray
July 21, 2000	Tampa	United States	Ice Palace	Macy Gray
July 22, 2000	Atlanta	United States	Lakewood Amphitheatre	Macy Gray
July 23, 2000	Charlotte	United States	Blockbuster Pavilion	Macy Gray
July 25, 2000	Raleigh	United States	Alltel Pavilion	Macy Gray
July 26, 2000	Virginia Beach	United States	GTE Virginia Beach Amphitheater	Macy Gray
July 28, 2000	Bristow	United States	Nissan Pavilion at Stone Ridge	Macy Gray
July 29, 2000	Wantagh	United States	Jones Beach Theater	Macy Gray
July 30, 2000	Wantagh	United States	Jones Beach Theater	Macy Gray
August 1, 2000	Mansfield	United States	Tweeter Center for the Performing Arts	Macy Gray
August 2, 2000	Mansfield	United States	Tweeter Center for the Performing Arts	Macy Gray
August 4, 2000	Camden	United States	Blockbuster-Sony Music Entertainment Centre at the Waterfront	Macy Gray
August 5, 2000	Holmdel Township	United States	PNC Bank Arts Center	Macy Gray
August 6, 2000	Hartford	United States	Meadows Music Theatre	Macy Gray
August 8, 2000	Montreal	Canada	Molson Centre	Macy Gray
August 9, 2000	Toronto	Canada	Molson Amphitheatre	Macy Gray
August 11, 2000	Cuyahoga Falls	United States	Blossom Music Center	Macy Gray
August 12, 2000	Cincinnati	United States	Riverbend Music Center	Macy Gray
August 13, 2000	Clarkston	United States	Pine Knob Music Theatre	Macy Gray
August 14, 2000	Clarkston	United States	Pine Knob Music Theatre	Macy Gray
August 16, 2000	Pittsburgh	United States	Coca-Cola Star Lake Amphitheater	Macy Gray
August 18, 2000	Milwaukee	United States	Marcus Amphitheater	Macy Gray
August 19, 2000	Tinley Park	United States	New World Music Theatre	Macy Gray
August 20, 2000	Noblesville	United States	Deer Creek Music Center	Macy Gray
August 22, 2000	Minneapolis	United States	Target Center	Macy Gray
September 28, 2000	Denver	United States	Pepsi Center	Everlast
September 30, 2000	Bonner Springs	United States	Sandstone Amphitheater	Everlast
October 1, 2000	Maryland Heights	United States	Riverport Amphitheatre	Everlast
October 3, 2000	New Orleans	United States	New Orleans Arena	Everlast
October 5, 2000	Dallas	United States	Smirnoff Music Centre	Everlast
October 6, 2000	The Woodlands	United States	Cynthia Woods Mitchell Pavilion	Everlast
October 7, 2000	The Woodlands	United States	Cynthia Woods Mitchell Pavilion	Everlast
October 8, 2000	San Antonio	United States	Alamodome	Everlast
October 10, 2000	Albuquerque	United States	Mesa del Sol Amphitheater	Everlast
October 11, 2000	Phoenix	United States	Blockbuster Desert Sky Pavilion	Everlast
October 13, 2000	Chula Vista	United States	Coors Amphitheatre	Everlast
October 14, 2000	Los Angeles	United States	Hollywood Bowl	Everlast
October 15, 2000	Los Angeles	United States	Hollywood Bowl	Everlast
October 17, 2000	Irvine	United States	Verizon Wireless Amphitheatre	Everlast
October 20, 2000	Mountain View	United States	Shoreline Amphitheatre	Everlast
October 21, 2000	Mountain View	United States	Shoreline Amphitheatre	Everlast
October 22, 2000	Wheatland	United States	Sacramento Valley Amphitheatre	Everlast
October 24, 2000	Portland	United States	Rose Garden	Everlast
October 25, 2000	Tacoma	United States	Tacoma Dome	Everlast
October 26, 2000	Vancouver	Canada	General Motors Place	Everlast
October 28, 2000	Concord	United States	Chronicle Pavilion	Ozomatli

== Box office score data ==
List of box office score data with date, city, venue, attendance, gross, references
Date	City	Venue	Attendance	Gross	Ref(s)
May 20, 1999	Philadelphia, United States	Veterans Stadium	133,869 / 143,965	$4,752,350	
May 21, 1999	Philadelphia, United States	Veterans Stadium	133,869 / 143,965	$4,752,350	
May 22, 1999	Philadelphia, United States	Veterans Stadium	133,869 / 143,965	$4,752,350	
May 25, 1999	East Rutherford, United States	Giants Stadium	106,012 / 106,012	$3,733,393	
May 26, 1999	East Rutherford, United States	Giants Stadium	106,012 / 106,012	$3,733,393	
August 7, 1999	Chula Vista, United States	Coors Amphitheatre	28,564 / 38,884	$1,084,075	
August 8, 1999	Chula Vista, United States	Coors Amphitheatre	28,564 / 38,884	$1,084,075	
August 11, 1999	Anaheim, United States	Arrowhead Pond of Anaheim	51,672 / 51,672	$2,333,546	
August 12, 1999	Anaheim, United States	Arrowhead Pond of Anaheim	51,672 / 51,672	$2,333,546	
August 13, 1999	Anaheim, United States	Arrowhead Pond of Anaheim	51,672 / 51,672	$2,333,546	
August 14, 1999	Anaheim, United States	Arrowhead Pond of Anaheim	51,672 / 51,672	$2,333,546	
August 15, 1999	Mountain View, United States	Shoreline Amphitheatre	22,000 / 22,000	$645,090	
December 3, 1999	Guadalajara, Mexico	Plaza de Toros Nuevo Progreso	24,167 / 24,167	$546,812	
December 4, 1999	Guadalajara, Mexico	Plaza de Toros Nuevo Progreso	24,167 / 24,167	$546,812	
July 22, 2000	Atlanta, United States	Lakewood Amphitheatre	18,954 / 18,954	$733,125	
July 29, 2000	Wantagh, United States	Jones Beach Theater	28,524 / 28,524	$1,194,145	
July 30, 2000	Wantagh, United States	Jones Beach Theater	28,524 / 28,524	$1,194,145	
August 13, 2000	Clarkston, United States	Pine Knob Music Theatre	30,548 / 30,548	$1,241,638	
August 14, 2000	Clarkston, United States	Pine Knob Music Theatre	30,548 / 30,548	$1,241,638	
October 5, 2000	Dallas, United States	Smirnoff Music Centre	16,937 / 17,000	$602,831	
October 8, 2000	San Antonio, United States	Alamodome	15,375 / 16,682	$636,516	
October 13, 2000	Chula Vista, United States	Coors Amphitheatre	16,661 / 19,442	$794,902	
October 14, 2000	Los Angeles, United States	Hollywood Bowl	30,037 / 35,104	$1,585,674	
October 15, 2000	Los Angeles, United States	Hollywood Bowl	30,037 / 35,104	$1,585,674	
October 25, 2000	Tacoma, United States	Tacoma Dome	14,841 / 16,000	$702,500	
October 26, 2000	Vancouver, Canada	General Motors Place	13,107 / 13,107	$648,357	
TOTAL			455,868 / 582,061 (78%)	$21,234,954	
