= Embrace Your Light Tour =

2005 concert tour by Santana

- Tour by Santana
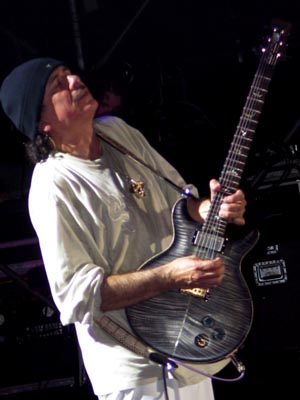
- Start date: May 3, 2005
- End date: October 16, 2005
- Legs: 2
- No. of shows: 46
- Box office: $10.333 million ($16.64 million in 2024 dollars)

Santana concert chronology
- Santana Latin American Tour 2005 (2005); Embrace Your Light Tour (2005); Emissaries For Peace Tour (2005)

The Embrace Your Light Tour was the thirty-fourth concert tour of North America by Santana in 2005.

== Tour band ==
- Andy Vargas – lead vocals
- Carlos Santana – lead guitar, percussion, vocals
- Tommy Anthony – rhythm guitar
- Chester D. Thompson – keyboards, vocals
- Salvador Santana – keyboards
- Benny Rietveld – bass guitar
- Dennis Chambers – drums
- William Ortiz – trumpet
- Jeff Cresman – trombone
- Bobby Allende – percussion, vocals
- Karl Perazzo – timbales, percussion, vocals
- Raul Rekow – congas, bongos, percussion, vocals (since August 31)

== Set list ==
An average set list of this tour was as follows:

1. "Jin-go-lo-ba" (Babatunde Olatunji)
2. "Hermes" (Carlos Santana, S. Jurad)
3. "Concierto de Aranjuez" (Joaquín Rodrigo)
4. "I Am Somebody" (William Adams Jr., George Pajon)
5. "El Fuego" (Santana, Jean Shepherd, Richard Shepherd)
6. "Maria Maria" (Santana, Karl Perazzo, Raul Rekow, Wyclef Jean, Jerry Duplessis)
7. "Foo Foo" (Yvon André, Roger Eugène, Yves Joseph, Hermann Nau, Claude Jean)
8. "Intimo"
9. "Brown Skin Girl" (Jamie Houston)
10. "Sun Ra"
11. "Hey Boogie Woman" (Bill Bartlett)
12. "Spiritual" (John Coltrane)
13. "(Da Le) Yaleo" (Santana, Shakara Mutela, Christian Polloni)
14. "I Don't Wanna Lose Your Love" (Henry Garza, Ringo Garza, Joey Garza)
15. "Apache" (Jerry Lordan)
16. "Smooth" (Itaal Shur, Rob Thomas)
17. "Dame Tu Amor" (Abraham Quintanilla, Ricky Vela, Richard Brooks)
18. "Corazón Espinado" (Fher Olvera)
19. "Evil Ways" (Clarence "Sonny" Henry)

Encore

20. "Black Magic Woman" (Peter Green)
21. "Gypsy Queen" (Gábor Szabó)
22. "Oye Como Va" (Tito Puente)
23. "A Love Supreme" (John Coltrane)

== Tour dates ==
=== Leg 1 (May 3 – July 3, 2005) ===
List of tour dates with date, city, country, venue
Date (2005)	City	Country	Venue
May 3	Kahului	United States	Maui Arts & Cultural Center
May 21	Montreal	Canada	Bell Centre
May 30	Tampa	United States	Ford Amphitheatre
June 1	Miami	United States	American Airlines Arena
June 3	Atlanta	United States	Chastain Park Amphitheater
June 4	Atlanta	United States	Chastain Park Amphitheater
June 5	Charlotte	United States	Verizon Wireless Amphitheatre
June 7	Columbia	United States	Merriweather Post Pavilion
June 8	Philadelphia	United States	Penn's Landing
June 11	Atlantic City	United States	Borgata Event Center
June 12	Atlantic City	United States	Borgata Event Center
June 14	Holmdel Township	United States	PNC Bank Arts Center
June 15	New York City	United States	Madison Square Garden
June 17	Mansfield	United States	Tweeter Center for the Performing Arts
June 19	Wallingford	United States	careerbuilder.com Oakdale Theatre
June 21	Montreal	Canada	Bell Centre
June 22	Quebec City	Canada	Colisée Pepsi
June 24	Toronto	Canada	Molson Amphitheatre
June 25	Clarkston	United States	Pine Knob Music Theatre
June 26	Cuyahoga Falls	United States	Blossom Music Center
June 29	Saint Paul	United States	Xcel Energy Center
July 1	Noblesville	United States	Verizon Wireless Music Center
July 2 (Note: The concert on July 2 was a part of Taste of Chicago.)	Chicago	United States	Grant Park
July 3 (Note: The concert on July 3 was a part of Summerfest.)	Milwaukee	United States	Marcus Amphitheater

=== Leg 2 (September 15 – October 16, 2005) ===
List of tour dates with date, city, country, venue
Date (2005)	City	Country	Venue
September 15	San Jose	United States	HP Pavilion
September 16	Sacramento	United States	ARCO Arena
September 17	Reno	United States	Reno Events Center
September 19	Portland	United States	Rose Garden
September 20	Everett	United States	Everett Events Center
September 21	Vancouver	Canada	General Motors Place
September 23	Edmonton	Canada	Rexall Place
September 24	Calgary	Canada	Pengrowth Saddledome
September 27	Morrison	United States	Red Rocks Amphitheatre
September 28	Morrison	United States	Red Rocks Amphitheatre
September 30	Grand Prairie	United States	Nokia Live
October 1	Grand Prairie	United States	Nokia Live
October 2	The Woodlands	United States	Cynthia Woods Mitchell Pavilion
October 4	Corpus Christi	United States	American Bank Center Arena
October 5	Hidalgo	United States	Dodge Arena
October 6	San Antonio	United States	SBC Center
October 8	El Paso	United States	Don Haskins Center
October 9	Albuquerque	United States	ABQ Journal Pavilion
October 11	Tucson	United States	Anselmo Valencia Tori Amphitheater
October 12	Chula Vista	United States	Coors Amphitheatre
October 14	Carson	United States	Home Depot Center
October 16	Concord	United States	Chronicle Pavilion

== Box office score data ==
List of box office score data with date, city, venue, attendance, gross, references
Date (2005)	City	Venue	Attendance	Gross	Ref(s)
May 21	Montreal, Canada	Bell Centre	8,000 / 9,000	$445,704	
May 30	Tampa, United States	Ford Amphitheatre	14,134 / 19,440	$491,418	
June 1	Miami, United States	American Airlines Arena	9,761 / 11,982	$498,659	
June 4	Atlanta, United States	Chastain Park Amphitheater	6,700 / 6,700	$536,135	
June 11	Atlantic City, United States	Borgata Event Center	4,432 / 4,604	$446,722	
June 12	Atlantic City, United States	Borgata Event Center	4,432 / 4,604	$446,722	
June 14	Holmdel Township, United States	PNC Bank Arts Center	7,276 / 16,988	$346,075	
June 15	New York City, United States	Madison Square Garden	12,730 / 14,114	$768,327	
June 17	Mansfield, United States	Tweeter Center for the Performing Arts	10,030 / 19,900	$438,369	
June 21	Montreal, Canada	Bell Centre	8,451 / 9,000	$484,824	
June 22	Quebec City, Canada	Colisée Pepsi	8,504 / 9,000	$465,823	
June 25	Clarkston, United States	Pine Knob Music Theatre	15,274 / 15,274	$445,185	
September 15	San Jose, United States	HP Pavilion	8,718 / 12,900	$476,867	
September 16	Sacramento, United States	ARCO Arena	8,666 / 9,500	$445,303	
September 17	Reno, United States	Reno Events Center	6,491 / 6,491	$478,021	
September 27	Morrison, United States	Red Rocks Amphitheatre	16,083 / 18,000	$979,577	
September 28	Morrison, United States	Red Rocks Amphitheatre	16,083 / 18,000	$979,577	
September 30	Grand Prairie, United States	Nokia Live	6,460 / 7,068	$452,328	
October 1	Grand Prairie, United States	Nokia Live	6,460 / 7,068	$452,328	
October 2	The Woodlands, United States	Cynthia Woods Mitchell Pavilion	11,110 / 15,715	$405,828	
October 4	Corpus Christi, United States	American Bank Center Arena	7,809 / 7,809	$427,926	
October 5	Hidalgo, United States	Dodge Arena	5,451 / 5,451	$484,065	
October 8	El Paso, United States	Don Haskins Center	8,023 / 8,023	$396,820	
October 16	Concord, United States	Chronicle Pavilion	10,758 / 12,500	$419,191	
TOTAL			194,861 / 239,459 (81%)	$10,333,167	
