= Shaman Tour =

2002–04 concert tour by Santana

- Tour by Santana
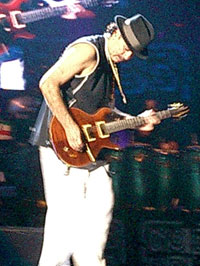
- Carlos Santana at Palau Sant Jordi in Barcelona, September 23, 2003
- Associated album: Shaman
- Start date: October 29, 2002
- End date: October 2, 2004
- Legs: 12
- No. of shows: 47 in North America; 43 in Europe; 9 in Oceania; 7 in Asia; 106 in total

Santana concert chronology
- All Is One Tour (2002); Shaman Tour (2002–04); Santana Latin American Tour 2005 (2005)

The Shaman Tour was the thirty-second concert tour promoting the band's 2002 album Shaman.

== Tour band ==
- Tony Lindsay – lead vocals (through May 16, 2004)
- Andy Vargas – lead vocals
- Carlos Santana – lead guitar, percussion, vocals
- Myron Dove – rhythm guitar
- Chester D. Thompson – keyboards
- Benny Rietveld – bass guitar
- Dennis Chambers – drums
- William Ortiz – trumpet
- Jeff Cresman – trombone
- Karl Perazzo – timbales, percussion, vocals
- Raul Rekow – congas, bongos, percussion, vocals

== Set list ==
An average set list of this tour is as follows:

1. "Jin-go-lo-ba" (Babatunde Olatunji)
2. "We Got Latin Soul" (Arlester "Dyke" Christian)
3. "Aye Aye Aye" (Michael Shrieve, Carlos Santana, Karl Perazzo, Raul Rekow)
4. "Put Your Lights On" (Erik Schrody)
5. "Victory Is Won" (Santana)
6. "Maria Maria" (Santana, Perazzo, Rekow, Wyclef Jean, Jerry Duplessis)
7. "Concierto de Aranjuez" (Joaquín Rodrigo)
8. "Foo Foo" (Yvon André, Roger Eugène, Yves Joseph, Hermann Nau, Claude Jean)
9. "Adouma" (Angélique Kidjo, Jean Hebrail)
10. "Sideways" (Clarence Greenwood)
11. "The Game of Love" (Gregg Alexander, Rick Nowels)
12. "Spiritual" (John Coltrane)
13. "(Da Le) Yaleo" (Santana, Shakara Mutela, Christian Polloni)
14. "Apache" (Jerry Lordan)
15. "Smooth" (Itaal Shur, Rob Thomas)
16. "Dame Tu Amor" (Abraham Quintanilla, Ricky Vela, Richard Brooks)
17. "Black Magic Woman" (Peter Green)
18. "Gypsy Queen" (Gábor Szabó)

Encore

19. "Oye Como Va" (Tito Puente)
20. "Hey Boogie Woman" (Bill Bartlett)
21. "Novus" (Santana, Szabó, Walter Afanasieff, Greg DiGiovine, Ritchie Rome)

== Tour dates ==
=== U.S. show (October 29, 2002) ===
List of tour dates with date, city, country, venue
Date	City	Country	Venue
October 29, 2002	Los Angeles	United States	Staples Center

=== European tour (December 3–16, 2002) ===
List of tour dates with date, city, country, venue
Date	City	Country	Venue
December 3, 2002	Barcelona	Spain	Mercat de les Flors
December 9, 2002	Munich	Germany	Deutsches Theater
December 16, 2002	London	England	London Astoria

=== U.S. leg (February 9–21, 2003) ===
List of tour dates with date, city, country, venue
Date	City	Country	Venue
February 9, 2003	Las Vegas	United States	The Joint
February 12, 2003	Laredo	United States	Laredo Entertainment Center
February 14, 2003	San Antonio	United States	Alamodome
February 15, 2003	Grand Prairie	United States	NextStage Performance Theater
February 16, 2003	Grand Prairie	United States	NextStage Performance Theater
February 18, 2003	Houston	United States	Compaq Center
February 19, 2003	New Orleans	United States	Senator Nat G. Kiefer University of New Orleans Lakefront Arena
February 21, 2003	Miami	United States	American Airlines Arena

=== Oceanic leg (March 21 – April 6, 2003) ===
List of tour dates with date, city, country, venue
Date	City	Country	Venue
March 21, 2003	New Plymouth	New Zealand	Bowl of Brooklands
March 22, 2003	Auckland	New Zealand	North Harbour Stadium
March 24, 2003	Brisbane	Australia	Brisbane Entertainment Centre
March 27, 2003	Sydney	Australia	Centennial Park
March 28, 2003	Sydney	Australia	Centennial Park
March 30, 2003	Adelaide	Australia	Memorial Drive Park
April 2, 2003	Perth	Australia	Burswood Dome
April 5, 2003	Melbourne	Australia	Sidney Myer Music Bowl
April 6, 2003	Melbourne	Australia	Rod Laver Arena
North America
May 17, 2003 (Note: The concert on May 17, 2003 was a part of Wango Tango.)	Pasadena	United States	Rose Bowl
June 13, 2003	Raleigh	United States	Alltel Pavilion
June 14, 2003	Bristow	United States	Nissan Pavilion at Stone Ridge
June 15, 2003	Pittsburgh	United States	Post-Gazette Pavilion
June 17, 2003	Hartford	United States	Meadows Music Theatre
June 18, 2003	Holmdel Township	United States	PNC Bank Arts Center
June 20, 2003	Wantagh	United States	Tommy Hilfiger at Jones Beach Theater
June 21, 2003	Wantagh	United States	Tommy Hilfiger at Jones Beach Theater
June 22, 2003	Saratoga Springs	United States	Saratoga Performing Arts Center
June 24, 2003	Camden	United States	Tweeter Center at the Waterfront
June 25, 2003	Mansfield	United States	Tweeter Center for the Performing Arts
June 27, 2003	Scranton	United States	Ford Pavilion
June 28, 2003	Darien Center	United States	Darien Lake Performing Arts Center
June 29, 2003	Toronto	Canada	Molson Amphitheatre
July 1, 2003	Clarkston	United States	Pine Knob Music Theatre
July 2, 2003	Columbus	United States	Germain Amphitheater
July 4, 2003	Milwaukee	United States	Marcus Amphitheater
July 5, 2003	Tinley Park	United States	Tweeter Center
July 6, 2003	Maryland Heights	United States	Riverport Amphitheatre
July 8, 2003	Greenwood Village	United States	Fiddler's Green Amphitheatre
July 11, 2003	Concord	United States	Chronicle Pavilion
July 12, 2003	Mountain View	United States	Shoreline Amphitheatre
July 13, 2003	Chula Vista	United States	Coors Amphitheatre
July 14, 2003	Los Angeles	United States	Hollywood Bowl
Europe
August 27, 2003	Helsinki	Finland	Hartwall Areena
August 29, 2003	Stockholm	Sweden	Stockholm Globe Arena
August 30, 2003	Oslo	Norway	Oslo Spektrum
August 31, 2003	Gothenburg	Sweden	Scandinavium
September 2, 2003	Hamburg	Germany	Color Line Arena
September 3, 2003	Dresden	Germany	Messe Dresden
September 5, 2003	Berlin	Germany	Max-Schmeling-Halle
September 6, 2003	Cologne	Germany	Kölnarena
September 7, 2003	Oberhausen	Germany	König Pilsener Arena
September 8, 2003	Rotterdam	Netherlands	Sportpaleis
September 10, 2003	Vienna	Austria	Wiener Stadthalle
September 12, 2003	Paris	France	Palais Omnisports de Paris-Bercy
September 14, 2003	Lindau	Germany	Strandbad Eichwald
September 15, 2003	Zürich	Switzerland	Hallenstadion
September 17, 2003	Munich	Germany	Olympiahalle München
September 18, 2003	Munich	Germany	Olympiahalle München
September 20, 2003	Rome	Italy	PalaLottomatica
September 21, 2003	Milan	Italy	FilaForum
September 23, 2003	Barcelona	Spain	Palau Sant Jordi
September 24, 2003	Madrid	Spain	Palacio Vistalegre
September 27, 2003	London	England	Wembley Arena
September 28, 2003	London	England	Wembley Arena

=== Asian leg (November 1–11, 2003) ===
List of tour dates with date, city, country, venue
Date	City	Country	Venue
November 1, 2003 (Note: The concert on November 1, 2003 was a part of Harbour Fest.)	Admiralty	Hong Kong	Tamar
November 3, 2003	Bangkok	Thailand	IMPACT Arena
November 6, 2003	Osaka	Japan	Festival Hall
November 7, 2003	Nagoya	Japan	Century Hall
November 8, 2003	Osaka	Japan	Namba Hatch
November 10, 2003	Tokyo	Japan	Nippon Budokan
November 11, 2003	Tokyo	Japan	Nippon Budokan

=== North American leg (November 14, 2003 – May 1, 2004) ===
List of tour dates with date, city, country, venue
Date	City	Country	Venue
November 14, 2003	Vancouver	Canada	General Motors Place
November 15, 2003	Tacoma	United States	Tacoma Dome
November 16, 2003	Portland	United States	Rose Garden
November 18, 2003	Sacramento	United States	ARCO Arena
November 20, 2003	Las Vegas	United States	MGM Grand Garden Arena
April 30, 2004	New Orleans	United States	Municipal Auditorium
May 1, 2004 (Note: The concert on May 1, 2004 was a part of the New Orleans Jazz & Heritage Festival.)	New Orleans	United States	Fair Grounds Race Course

=== Italian show (May 16, 2004) ===
List of tour dates with date, city, country, venue
Date	City	Country	Venue
May 16, 2004 (Note: The concert on May 16, 2004 was a part of We Are the Future.)	Rome	Italy	Circus Maximus

=== U.S. leg (June 6–24, 2004) ===
List of tour dates with date, city, country, venue
Date	City	Country	Venue
June 6, 2004 (Note: The concert on June 6, 2004 was a part of the Crossroads Guitar Festival.)	Dallas	United States	Cotton Bowl Stadium
June 22, 2004	San Francisco	United States	Warfield Theatre
June 23, 2004	San Francisco	United States	Warfield Theatre
June 24, 2004	San Francisco	United States	Warfield Theatre

=== European leg (July 2, 2004) ===
List of tour dates with date, city, country, venue
Date	City	Country	Venue
July 2, 2004	Metz	France	Galaxie Amnéville
July 3, 2004	Aurich	Germany	Open Air Gelände Tannenhausen
July 4, 2004 (Note: The concert on July 6, 2004 was a part of the Roskilde Festival.)	Roskilde	Denmark	Darupvej
July 6, 2004	Bonn	Germany	Museumsplatz
July 7, 2004	Frankfurt	Germany	Opernplatz
July 9, 2004 (Note: The concert on July 9, 2004 was a part of the North Sea Jazz Festival.)	The Hague	Netherlands	Statenhal
July 10, 2004	Bocholt	Germany	Stadion am Hünting
July 11, 2004	Freiburg im Breisgau	Germany	Messehalle
July 13, 2004 (Note: The concert on July 13, 2004 was a part of the Montreux Jazz Festival.)	Montreux	Switzerland	Auditorium Stravinski
July 15, 2004	Montreux	Switzerland	Auditorium Stravinski
July 17, 2004	Naples	Italy	Piazza del Plebiscito
July 18, 2004 (Note: The concert on July 18, 2004 was a part of the Pistoia Blues Festival.)	Pistoia	Italy	Piazza del Duomo
July 20, 2004	Zagreb	Croatia	Dom Sportova
July 21, 2004	Budapest	Hungary	László Papp Budapest Sports Arena
July 23, 2004	Prague	Czech Republic	T-Mobile Arena
July 24, 2004	Würzburg	Germany	Würzburg Residence
July 25, 2004	Schwäbisch Gmünd	Germany	Schießtalplatz

=== U.S. leg (September 30 – October 2, 2004) ===
List of tour dates with date, city, country, venue
Date	City	Country	Venue
September 30, 2004	Los Angeles	United States	Greek Theatre
October 1, 2004	Los Angeles	United States	Greek Theatre
October 2, 2004	Los Angeles	United States	Greek Theatre

== Box office score data ==
List of box office score data with date, city, venue, attendance, gross, references
Date	City	Venue	Attendance	Gross	Ref(s)
February 12, 2003	Laredo, United States	Laredo Entertainment Center	8,413 / 8,413	$442,079	
February 14, 2003	San Antonio, United States	Alamodome	18,781 / 18,781	$881,017	
February 18, 2003	Houston, United States	Compaq Center	11,581 / 11,581	$543,443	
February 19, 2003	New Orleans, United States	Senator Nat G. Kiefer University of New Orleans Lakefront Arena	5,903 / 5,903	$219,604	
February 21, 2003	Miami, United States	American Airlines Arena	11,589 / 11,589	$650,774	
May 17, 2003	Pasadena, United States	Rose Bowl	42,550 / 60,000	$1,772,148	
June 20, 2003	Wantagh, United States	Tommy Hilfiger at Jones Beach Theater	17,108 / 27,888	$897,318	
June 21, 2003	Wantagh, United States	Tommy Hilfiger at Jones Beach Theater	17,108 / 27,888	$897,318	
July 12, 2003	Mountain View, United States	Shoreline Amphitheatre	15,885 / 21,895	$656,818	
July 13, 2003	Chula Vista, United States	Coors Amphitheatre	10,215 / 12,000	$472,055	
November 14, 2003	Vancouver, Canada	General Motors Place	10,987 / 13,619	$531,860	
November 15, 2003	Tacoma, United States	Tacoma Dome	7,280 / 8,675	$347,760	
November 16, 2003	Portland, United States	Rose Garden	5,906 / 6,069	$248,062	
September 30, 2004	Los Angeles, United States	Greek Theatre	16,184 / 16,278	$1,125,980	
October 1, 2004	Los Angeles, United States	Greek Theatre	16,184 / 16,278	$1,125,980	
October 2, 2004	Los Angeles, United States	Greek Theatre	16,184 / 16,278	$1,125,980	
TOTAL			182,388 / 222,697 (82%)	$8,788,918	
