= Mazda Palace =

Mazda Palace may refer to multiple indoor arenas in Italy:

- Mazda Palace (Milan), also known as Palatrussardi and PalaSharp
- Mazda Palace (Torino), also known as PalaTorino and PalaStampa
- Mazda Palace (Genoa), also known as Vaillant Palace
