= The Final Lap Tour =

2023 concert tour by 50 Cent

- Tour by 50 Cent
- Associated album: Get Rich or Die Tryin'
- Start date: July 21, 2023
- End date: March 3, 2024
- Legs: 3
- No. of shows: 105

The Final Lap Tour was a concert tour by American rapper 50 Cent to celebrate the twentieth anniversary of his blockbuster album Get Rich or Die Tryin, along with Busta Rhymes supporting and special guest in all dates and Jeremih in North America dates. It kicked off on July 21, 2023, in Salt Lake City and concluded on December 14, 2023, in Auckland, New Zealand. The tour consisted of 103 shows and three legs across North America, Europe, Asia and Oceania.

Billboard reported that The Final Lap Tour grossed $103.6 million, with over 1.05 million tickets sold across 83 shows in North America, Europe, Oceania and Asia, becoming just the third rap tour ever to cross $100 million.

== Tour dates ==
List of 2023 concert
| Date (2023) | City | Country | Venue | Opening Acts |
|---|---|---|---|---|
| July 21 | West Valley City | United States | Maverik Center | Busta Rhymes, Jeremih |
| July 23 | Denver | United States | Ball Arena | Busta Rhymes, Jeremih |
| July 25 | Maryland Heights | United States | Hollywood Casino Amphitheatre | Busta Rhymes, Jeremih |
| July 27 | Noblesville | United States | Ruoff Music Center | Busta Rhymes, Jeremih |
| July 28 | Nashville | United States | Bridgestone Arena | Busta Rhymes, Jeremih |
| July 29 | Cincinnati | United States | Riverbend Music Center | Busta Rhymes, Jeremih |
| July 31 | Toronto | Canada | Budweiser Stage | Busta Rhymes, Jeremih |
| August 1 | Montreal | Canada | Bell Centre | Busta Rhymes, Jeremih |
| August 2 | Montreal | Canada | Bell Centre | Busta Rhymes, Jeremih |
| August 3 | Mansfield | United States | Xfinity Center | Busta Rhymes, Jeremih |
| August 5 | Darien | United States | Darien Lake Performing Arts Center | Busta Rhymes, Jeremih |
| August 6 | Cuyahoga Falls | United States | Blossom Music Center | Busta Rhymes, Jeremih |
| August 8 | Bristow | United States | Jiffy Lube Live | Busta Rhymes, Jeremih |
| August 9 | Brooklyn | United States | Barclays Center | Busta Rhymes, Jeremih |
| August 10 | Brooklyn | United States | Barclays Center | Busta Rhymes, Jeremih |
| August 11 | Hartford | United States | Xfinity Theatre | Busta Rhymes, Jeremih |
| August 12 | Camden | United States | Freedom Mortgage Pavilion | Busta Rhymes, Jeremih |
| August 13 | Virginia Beach | United States | Veterans United Home Loans Amphitheater | Busta Rhymes, Jeremih |
| August 15 | Raleigh | United States | Coastal Credit Union Music Park at Walnut Creek | Busta Rhymes, Jeremih |
| August 16 | Charlotte | United States | PNC Music Pavilion | Busta Rhymes, Jeremih |
| August 17 | Atlanta | United States | Cellairis Amphitheatre | Busta Rhymes, Jeremih |
| August 19 | Tampa | United States | MidFlorida Credit Union Amphitheatre | Busta Rhymes, Jeremih |
| August 20 | West Palm Beach | United States | iTHINK Financial Amphitheatre | Busta Rhymes, Jeremih |
| August 22 | Tuscalossa | United States | Tuscaloosa Amphitheater | Busta Rhymes, Jeremih |
| August 24 | Houston | United States | Toyota Center | Busta Rhymes, Jeremih |
| August 25 | Dallas | United States | Dos Equis Pavilion | Busta Rhymes, Jeremih |
| August 27 | Albuquerque | United States | Isleta Amphitheater | Busta Rhymes, Jeremih |
| August 30 | Los Angeles | United States | Crypto.com Arena | Busta Rhymes, Jeremih |
| August 31 | Chula Vista | United States | North Island Credit Union Amphitheatre | Busta Rhymes, Jeremih |
| September 1 | Irvine | United States | FivePoint Amphitheatre | Busta Rhymes, Jeremih |
| September 2 | Mountain View | United States | Shoreline Amphitheatre | Busta Rhymes, Jeremih |
| September 4 | Sacramento | United States | Golden 1 Center | Busta Rhymes, Jeremih |
| September 6 | Ridgefield | United States | RV Inn Style Resorts Amphitheater | Busta Rhymes, Jeremih |
| September 7 | Seattle | United States | Climate Pledge Arena | Busta Rhymes, Jeremih |
| September 8 | Vancouver | Canada | Rogers Arena | Busta Rhymes, Jeremih |
| September 10 | Calgary | Canada | Scotiabank Saddledome | Busta Rhymes, Jeremih |
| September 11 | Edmonton | Canada | Rogers Place | Busta Rhymes, Jeremih |
| September 13 | Winnipeg | Canada | Canada Life Centre | Busta Rhymes, Jeremih |
| September 15 | St. Paul | United States | Xcel Energy Center | Busta Rhymes, Jeremih |
| September 16 | Chicago | United States | United Center | Busta Rhymes, Jeremih |
| September 17 | Clarkston | United States | Pine Knob Music Theatre | Busta Rhymes, Jeremih |
| September 19 | Baltimore | United States | CFG Bank Arena | Busta Rhymes, Jeremih |
| September 20 | Holmdel | United States | PNC Bank Arts Center | Busta Rhymes, Jeremih |
| September 22 | Toronto | Canada | Budweiser Stage | Busta Rhymes, Jeremih |
| September 28 | Amsterdam | Netherlands | Ziggo Dome | Busta Rhymes |
| September 29 | Hamburg | Germany | Barclays Arena | Busta Rhymes |
| September 30 | Copenhagen | Denmark | Royal Arena | Busta Rhymes |
| October 2 | Stavanger | Norway | Forum Expo Stavanger | Busta Rhymes |
| October 4 | Oslo | Norway | Oslo Spektrum | Busta Rhymes |
| October 5 | Trondheim | Norway | Trondheim Spektrum / UKA | Busta Rhymes |
| October 7 | Stockholm | Sweden | Avicii Arena | Busta Rhymes |
| October 9 | Riga | Latvia | Arena Riga | Busta Rhymes |
| October 10 | Riga | Latvia | Arena Riga | Busta Rhymes |
| October 11 | Kaunas | Lithuania | Žalgiris Arena | Busta Rhymes |
| October 13 | Hannover | Germany | ZAG Arena | Busta Rhymes |
| October 14 | Berlin | Germany | Mercedes-Benz-Arena | Busta Rhymes |
| October 15 | Oberhausen | Germany | Rudolf-Weber Arena | Busta Rhymes |
| October 17 | Zagreb | Croatia | Arena Zagreb | Busta Rhymes |
| October 18 | Budapest | Hungary | Budapest Arena | Busta Rhymes |
| October 20 | Zurich | Switzerland | Hallenstadion | Busta Rhymes |
| October 21 | Nice | France | Palais Nikaia | Busta Rhymes |
| October 22 | Milan | Italy | Mediolanum Forum | Busta Rhymes |
| October 24 | Munich | Germany | Olympiahalle | Busta Rhymes |
| October 25 | Mannheim | Germany | SAP Arena | Busta Rhymes |
| October 26 | Brussels | Belgium | Forest National | Busta Rhymes |
| October 28 | Prague | Czech Republic | O2 Arena | Busta Rhymes |
| October 29 | Lodz | Poland | Atlas Arena | Busta Rhymes |
| October 31 | Strasbourg | France | Zenith | Busta Rhymes |
| November 2 | Nantes | France | Zenith | Busta Rhymes |
| November 3 | Paris | France | La Defense Arena | Busta Rhymes |
| November 6 | Dublin | Ireland | 3 Arena | Busta Rhymes |
| November 7 | Dublin | Ireland | 3 Arena | Busta Rhymes |
| November 9 | Glasgow | Scotland | OVO Hydro | Busta Rhymes |
| November 10 | Manchester | England | AO Arena | Busta Rhymes |
| November 11 | London | England | The O2 Arena | Busta Rhymes |
| November 12 | Birmingham | England | Resorts World Arena | Busta Rhymes |
| November 14 | Birmingham | England | Resorts World Arena | Busta Rhymes |
| November 15 | Manchester | England | AO Arena | Busta Rhymes |
| November 17 | London | England | OVO Arena Wembley | Busta Rhymes |
| November 18 | Newcastle | England | Utilita Arena | Busta Rhymes |
| November 19 | Glasgow | Scotland | OVO Hydro | Busta Rhymes |
| November 21 | London | England | The O2 Arena | Busta Rhymes |
| November 23 | Zallaq | Bahrain | Al Dana Amphitheatre | Busta Rhymes |
| November 25 | Mumbai | India | DY Patil Stadium | Busta Rhymes |
| November 28 | Almaty | Kazakhstan | Almaty Arena | Busta Rhymes |
| December 2 | Perth | Australia | RAC Arena | Busta Rhymes |
| December 4 | Adelaide | Australia | Adelaide Entertainment Centre | Busta Rhymes |
| December 5 | Melbourne | Australia | Rod Laver Arena | Busta Rhymes |
| December 6 | Melbourne | Australia | Rod Laver Arena | Busta Rhymes |
| December 8 | Sydney | Australia | Qudos Bank Arena | Busta Rhymes |
| December 9 | Sydney | Australia | Qudos Bank Arena | Busta Rhymes |
| December 10 | Brisbane | Australia | Brisbane Entertainment | Busta Rhymes |
| December 11 | Brisbane | Australia | Brisbane Entertainment | Busta Rhymes |
| December 14 | Auckland | New Zealand | Spark Arena | Busta Rhymes |
| December 16 | Riyadh | Saudi Arabia | Banban | Busta Rhymes |
| December 19 | Nonthaburi | Thailand | IMPACT Arena | Busta Rhymes |
| December 21 | Abu Dhabi | United Arab Emirates | Etihad Arena | Busta Rhymes |

List of 2024 concert
| Date (2024) | City | Country | Venue | Opening Acts |
|---|---|---|---|---|
| March 3, 2024 | Phoenix | United States | Talking Stick Resort Amphitheatre | Jeremih |

== Personnel ==
- 50 Cent - Vocals
- Gene Tolbert - Music Director/Keyboards
- Travis Ferguson - Guitar
- SDot - Keyboards
- Dre Plaskett - keyboards
- DJ Chubby Chub - turntables
- DJ Kayotik - turntables (Edmonton - remainder of the tour)
- Darius Woodley - drums
- Evan Rainey - bass
