= Santana Latin American Tour 2005 =

2005 concert tour by Santana

- Tour by Santana
- Start date: April 1, 2005
- End date: April 15, 2005
- Legs: 1
- No. of shows: 7

Santana concert chronology
- Shaman Tour (2002–04); Santana Latin American Tour 2005 (2005); Embrace Your Light Tour (2005)

Santana Latin American Tour 2005 was a Latin American concert tour by American rock band Santana in 2005.

== Tour band ==
- Andy Vargas – lead vocals
- Carlos Santana – lead guitar, percussion, vocals
- Tommy Anthony – rhythm guitar
- Chester D. Thompson – keyboards, vocals
- Salvador Santana – keyboards
- Benny Rietveld – bass guitar
- Dennis Chambers – drums
- William Ortiz – trumpet
- Jeff Cresman – trombone
- Bobby Allende – percussion, vocals
- Karl Perazzo – timbales, percussion, vocals

== Set list ==
This set list is representative of the show on April 10. It does not represent all concerts for the duration of the tour.

1. "Jin-go-lo-ba" (Babatunde Olatunji)
2. "Roule" (Carlos Santana, S. Jurad)
3. "Put Your Lights On" (Erik Schrody)
4. "Aye Aye Aye" (Michael Shrieve, Santana, Karl Perazzo, Raul Rekow)
5. "Concierto de Aranjuez" (Joaquín Rodrigo)
6. "Maria Maria" (Santana, Perazzo, Rekow, Wyclef Jean, Jerry Duplessis)
7. "Foo Foo" (Yvon André, Roger Eugène, Yves Joseph, Hermann Nau, Claude Jean)
8. "Samba Pa Ti" (Santana)
9. "Batuka" (José Areas, David Brown, Michael Carabello, Gregg Rolie, Michael Shrieve)
10. "No One to Depend On" (Carabello, Coke Escovedo, Rolie, Willie Bobo, Melvin Lastie)
11. "El Fuego" (Santana, Jean Shepherd, Richard Shepherd)
12. "Make Somebody Happy" (Santana, Alex Ligertwood)
13. "Spiritual" (John Coltrane)
14. "(Da Le) Yaleo" (Santana, Shakara Mutela, Christian Polloni)
15. "Black Magic Woman" (Peter Green)
16. "Gypsy Queen" (Gábor Szabó)
17. "Oye Como Va" (Tito Puente)

Encore

18. "Apache" (Jerry Lordan)
19. "Smooth" (Itaal Shur, Rob Thomas)
20. "Dame Tu Amor" (Abraham Quintanilla, Ricky Vela, Richard Brooks)
21. "Corazón Espinado" (Fher Olvera)
22. "Evil Ways" (Clarence "Sonny" Henry)
23. "A Love Supreme" (John Coltrane)

== Tour dates ==
List of tour dates with date, city, country, venue
Date (2005)	City	Country	Venue
April 1	San Juan	Puerto Rico	Coliseo de Puerto Rico José Miguel Agrelot
April 4	Panama City	Panama	Figali Convention Center
April 6	San José	Costa Rica	Estadio Ricardo Saprissa Aymá
April 8	San Salvador	El Salvador	Estadio Jorge "Mágico" González
April 10	Mexico City	Mexico	Palacio de los Deportes
April 12	Guadalajara	Mexico	Plaza de Toros Nuevo Progreso
April 15	Mexico City	Mexico	Plaza de la Constitución

== Box office score data ==
List of box office score data with date, city, venue, attendance, gross, references
Date (2005)	City	Venue	Attendance	Gross	Ref(s)
April 1	San Juan, Puerto Rico	Coliseo de Puerto Rico José Miguel Agrelot	10,677 / 13,215	$696,718	
April 10	Mexico City, Mexico	Palacio de los Deportes	15,863 / 15,863	$696,527	
TOTAL			26,540 / 29,078 (91%)	$1,393,245	
