= Sleep Train Amphitheatre =

Sleep Train Amphitheatre may refer to

- Sleep Train Amphitheatre (Chula Vista, California)
- Sleep Train Amphitheatre (Wheatland, California)
