= MidFlorida Credit Union Amphitheatre =

Amphitheater in East Lake-Orient Park, Florida, United States

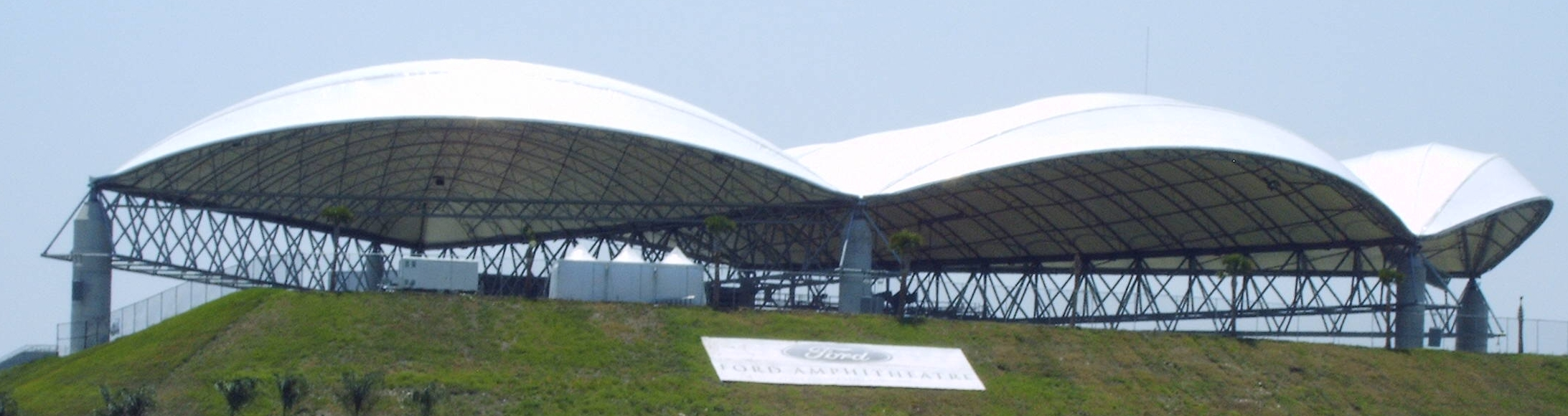
- Interactive map of MidFlorida Credit Union Amphitheatre
- Full name: MidFlorida Credit Union Amphitheatre
- Former names: Tampa Bay Amphitheatre (planning/construction); Ford Amphitheatre (2004–10); 1-800-ASK-GARY Amphitheatre (2010–12); Live Nation Amphitheatre (2013)
- Address: 4802 N U.S. Hwy 301; Tampa, FL 33610
- Location: Florida State Fairgrounds
- Coordinates: 27.994060°N 82.364609°W
- Owner: Florida State Fair Authority
- Operator: Live Nation
- Capacity: 20,000
- Type: Outdoor

Construction
- Opened: July 25, 2004

Website
- www.midflorida.com/amphitheatre

The MidFlorida Credit Union Amphitheatre (originally Ford Amphitheatre and formerly 1-800-ASK-GARY Amphitheatre and Live Nation Amphitheatre) is an outdoor amphitheater in East Lake-Orient Park, Florida. The venue is located on the Florida State Fairgrounds, adjacent to Interstate 4, in the eastern side of town.

MidFlorida Credit Union Amphitheatre has a capacity of approximately 20,000 (9,900 reserved seats and 10,000 on the lawn).

== About the venue ==
Originally named the Ford Amphitheatre, when opened by Christian artists Michael W. Smith, David Crowder and headliner Mercy Me on July 23, 2004. It was renamed the 1-800-ASK-GARY Amphitheatre when the naming rights were purchased by the lawyer referral service for 2010 to 2012. The name change was not well received. In an online poll accompanying an article on the subject in the St. Petersburg Times, 95% of people responded with either "I hate it" or "I think it's pretty lame". At the beginning of 2013, it was announced Live Nation chose not the renew the naming rights for the facility. For the first five months of 2013, the venue was known as the Live Nation Amphitheatre. On May 15, 2013, MidFlorida Credit Union, a Florida-based financial institution acquired the naming rights for three years.

The amphitheater has played host to many music festivals. On the first Sunday of every December, it hosts 97X's Next Big Thing, an all day rock festival, mainly featuring alternative rock bands.

Bands that perform there must obey a decibel limit, due to noise complaints from residents that live close to the venue. A wall was erected in an attempt to help shield the noise.

== Events ==
List of events held at the Amphitheatre
Artist	Event	Date	Opening Act(s)
50 Cent	The Final Lap Tour	August 19, 2023	Busta Rhymes, Jeremih
311	Summer Unity Tour	August 1, 2004	The Roots
311	Summer Unity Tour	September 3, 2005	Unwritten Law
311	Summer Unity Tour	August 27, 2006	The Wailers Band & Pepper
311	Summer Unity Tour	July 18, 2007	Matisyahu & The English Beat
311	Summer Unity Tour	July 27, 2008	Snoop Dogg & Fiction Plane
311	Summer Unity Tour	July 20, 2012	Slightly Stoopid & The Aggrolites
311	Summer Unity Tour	July 23, 2013	Cypress Hill, G. Love & Special Sauce, Pennywise & Sublime with Rome
78violet	NextFest Tour	August 18, 2007	Drake Bell, Corbin Bleu & Bianca Ryan
Aerosmith	Cocked, Locked, Ready to Rock Tour	August 7, 2010	Blue Öyster Cult
Aerosmith & Mötley Crüe	Route of All Evil Tour	November 22, 2006	Lennon Murphy
Alan Jackson & The Strayhorns	What I Do Tour	November 2, 2004	Martina McBride
Alan Jackson & The Strayhorns	2005 Tour	November 4, 2005	Sara Evans
Alan Jackson & The Strayhorns	Like Red on a Rose Tour	December 2, 2006	Little Big Town & The Wreckers
Alice in Chains	2007 Tour	October 6, 2007	Velvet Revolver & Sparta
The Allman Brothers Band	2005 Tour	May 21, 2005	Lynyrd Skynyrd
America's Most Wanted Music Festival		September 5, 2009	
America's Most Wanted Music Festival		July 13, 2013	
Arab Idol Live!		December 14, 2013	
Avril Lavigne	Bonez Tour	August 20, 2005	Gavin DeGraw & Butch Walker
Avril Lavigne	The Best Damn Tour	April 19, 2008	Boys Like Girls
Backstreet Boys	Never Gone Tour	July 23, 2005	The Click Five & Kaci Brown
Backstreet Boys	In a World Like This Tour	August 23, 2013	Jesse McCartney & DJ Pauly D
Backstreet Boys	DNA World Tour	June 21, 2022	Delta Goodrem
The Bamboozle Festival	The Bamboozle Roadshow 2010	May 26, 2010	
Barenaked Ladies	Last Summer on Earth Tour	July 17, 2012	Blues Traveler, Big Head Todd and the Monsters & Cracker
Big Guava Festival		May 2, 2014	
Big Guava Festival		May 3, 2014	
Big Guava Festival		May 4, 2014	
Big Time Rush	Big Time Summer Tour	August 25, 2012	Cody Simpson & Leon Thomas III
Big Time Rush	Forever Tour	July 22, 2022	Dixie D'Amelio
The Black Crowes	2006 Tour	July 7, 2006	Drive-By Truckers & Robert Randolph and the Family Band
Black Sabbath	2013 Reunion Tour	July 29, 2013	
Blake Shelton	Ten Times Crazier Tour	August 30, 2013	Easton Corbin & Jana Kramer
Blink-182	2009 Reunion Tour	September 27, 2009	The All-American Rejects, Fall Out Boy & Asher Roth
Blink-182	10th Annual Honda Civic Tour	September 24, 2011	My Chemical Romance & Matt & Kim
Blink-182	California Tour	August 6, 2016	A Day to Remember & The All American Rejects
Blink-182	Blink-182 and Lil Wayne Tour	July 26, 2019	Neck Deep
Bob Dylan	Americanarama Festival of Music Tour	June 27, 2013	Wilco, My Morning Jacket & Bob Weir
Boston	Corporate America Tour	August 24, 2004	
Brad Paisley & The Drama Kings	Time Well Wasted Tour	August 5, 2006	Sara Evans & Eric Church
Brad Paisley & The Drama Kings	Bonfires & Amplifiers Tour	September 21, 2007	Rodney Atkins & Taylor Swift
Brad Paisley & The Drama Kings	Paisley Party Tour	September 19, 2008	Jewel, Chuck Wicks & Julianne Hough
Brad Paisley & The Drama Kings	American Saturday Night Tour	October 16, 2009	Dierks Bentley & Jimmy Wayne
Brad Paisley & The Drama Kings	H2O Tour	August 13, 2010	Darius Rucker, Justin Moore, Josh Thompson, Easton Corbin & Steel Magnolia
Brad Paisley & The Drama Kings	H2O II: Wetter & Wilder Tour	September 9, 2011	Blake Shelton & Jerrod Niemann
Brad Paisley & The Drama Kings	Virtual Reality World Tour	September 28, 2012	The Band Perry & Scotty McCreery
Brad Paisley & The Drama Kings	Beat This Summer Tour	June 22, 2013	Chris Young & The Henningsens
Brad Paisley & The Drama Kings	Country Nation World Tour	August 15, 2014	Randy Houser, Charlie Worsham & Leah Turner
Brooks & Dunn	Neon Circus & Wild West Show Tour	October 23, 2004	Montgomery Gentry & Gretchen Wilson
Brooks & Dunn	Neon Circus & Wild West Show Tour	October 29, 2005	Big & Rich, The Warren Brothers & Cowboy Troy
Brooks & Dunn	Long Haul Tour	November 11, 2006	Jack Ingram & Sugarland
Brooks & Dunn	2007 Tour	October 20, 2007	Alan Jackson, Jake Owen & Catherine Britt
Brooks & Dunn	2008 Tour	July 25, 2008	Rodney Atkins & James Otto
Brooks & Dunn	Last Rodeo Tour	June 11, 2010	Jason Aldean & Tyler Dickerson
Bruce Springsteen & The E Street Band	Working on a Dream Tour	September 12, 2009	
Bruce Springsteen & The E Street Band	High Hopes Tour	May 1, 2014	
Charlie Daniels Band	Volunteer Jam Tour	May 11, 2007	The Marshall Tucker Band & Outlaws
Charlie-Palooza		December 11, 2004	
Chicago	2005 Tour	August 13, 2005	Earth, Wind & Fire
Chicago	Chicago XXX Tour	July 13, 2006	Huey Lewis and the News
Chris Brown	Up Close & Personal Tour	September 8, 2006	Lil Wayne, Juelz Santana, Dem Franchize Boyz & Ne-Yo
Chris Brown	F.A.M.E. Tour	October 7, 2011	Bow Wow, T-Pain, Kelly Rowland & Tyga
Coastline Festival		November 9, 2013	
Coldplay	Twisted Logic Tour	March 5, 2006	Fiona Apple
Coral Skies Music Festival		October 25, 2014	
Counting Crows	Saturday Nights & Sunday Mornings Tour	October 3, 2008	Maroon 5 & Augustana
Country Throwdown Tour		May 14, 2010	
Creed	Full Circle Reunion Tour	September 1, 2010	Skillet & Theft
Crüe Fest	Crüe Fest	July 3, 2008	
Crüe Fest	Crüe Fest 2	August 28, 2009	
Curiosa Festival		July 25, 2004	
Dave Matthews Band	2004 Tour	July 29, 2004	Daniel Lanois
Dave Matthews Band	Stand Up Tour	July 14, 2005	Marc Broussard
Dave Matthews Band	2006 Tour	August 9, 2006	Pat Green
Dave Matthews Band	2007 Tour	September 12, 2007	The Wailers Band
Dave Matthews Band	2008 Tour	July 9, 2008	Gomez
Dave Matthews Band	Big Whiskey & the GrooGrux King Tour	August 12, 2009	Robert Earl Keen
Dave Matthews Band	2010 Tour	July 28, 2010	Gov't Mule
Dave Matthews Band	2012 Tour	July 18, 2012	Tower of Power
Dave Matthews Band	Away from the World Tour	July 17, 2013	Blind Pilot
Dave Matthews Band	2014 Tour	July 16, 2014	
Def Leppard	Yeah! Tour	July 11, 2006	Journey & Stoll Vaughan
Def Leppard	Downstage Thrust Tour	August 24, 2007	Styx & Foreigner
Def Leppard	Songs from the Sparkle Lounge Tour	August 14, 2009	Poison & Cheap Trick
Def Leppard	Mirrorball Tour	June 17, 2011	Heart
Depeche Mode	Tour of the Universe	September 4, 2009	Peter Bjorn and John
Depeche Mode	Delta Machine Tour	September 14, 2013	Bat for Lashes
Donald Trump	2016 United States elections	October 24, 2016	Pam Bondi
Earth, Wind & Fire	2004 Tour	July 27, 2004	Chicago
Earth, Wind & Fire	Illumination Tour	September 3, 2006	Chris Botti
Eric Clapton	2008 Tour	May 3, 2008	Robert Randolph and the Family Band
Fall Out Boy & Paramore	Monumentour	July 26, 2014	New Politics
Fifth Harmony	The 7/27 Tour	August 25, 2016	JoJo and Victoria Monét
Five Finger Death Punch	And Justice For None	August 11, 2018	Breaking Benjamin, Nothing More and Bad Wolves
Family Values Tour	Family Values Tour 2007	August 15, 2007	
The Felice Brothers	Yonder Is the Clock Tour	September 29, 2009	
Fiesta Maxima		June 16, 2012	
Fiesta Maxima		April 6, 2013	
Fiesta Mexicana		September 29, 2007	
FunShine Music Festival		May 3, 2013	
FunShine Music Festival		May 4, 2013	
FunShine Music Festival		May 5, 2013	
Gary Valenciano	As 1 Tour	March 6, 2010	Martin Nievera
Goo Goo Dolls	20th Anniversary Tour	September 1, 2006	Counting Crows & Eliot Morris
Goo Goo Dolls	2007 Tour	August 4, 2007	Lifehouse & Colbie Caillat
Goo Goo Dolls	Something for the Rest of Us Tour	August 15, 2010	Switchfoot & Boyce Avenue
Goo Goo Dolls & Matchbox 20	2013 Summer Tour	August 4, 2013	Kate Earl
Goo Goo Dolls & Daughtry	Goo Goo Dolls/Daughtry Summer Tour	June 20, 2014	Plain White T's
Gwen Stefani	The Sweet Escape Tour	May 8, 2007	Akon, Lady Sovereign & Raistalla
Hank Williams Jr.	2005 Tour	January 29, 2005	
Heart	Heartbreaker Tour	June 18, 2013	Jason Bonham's Led Zeppelin Experience
Honda Civic Tour	6th Annual Honda Civic Tour	June 15, 2007	
Honda Civic Tour	10th Annual Honda Civic Tour	September 24, 2011	
Honda Civic Tour	12th Annual Honda Civic Tour	September 13, 2013	
Hootie & the Blowfish	Looking for Lucky Tour	September 15, 2006	Better Than Ezra
Identity Festival		August 24, 2011	
Identity Festival		August 3, 2012	
Il Divo	Ancora Tour	June 16, 2006	Katie Melua
Incubus	Light Grenades Tour	August 30, 2007	The Bravery & Simon Dawes
Incubus	Monuments and Melodies Tour	August 15, 2009	The Duke Spirit
Incubus	If Not Now, When? Tour	September 18, 2011	Young the Giant
Jack Johnson	2010 World Tour	August 25, 2010	G. Love & Special Sauce & Animal Liberation Orchestra
Janet Jackson	State of the World Tour	August 7, 2018	
Janet Jackson	Together Again	July 16, 2024	Nelly
Jason Aldean	My Kinda Party Tour	July 15, 2011	Chris Young & Thompson Square
Jason Aldean	My Kinda Party Tour	August 10, 2012	Luke Bryan & Rachel Farley
Jason Aldean	Night Train Tour	September 6, 2013	Jake Owen & Thomas Rhett
Jason Aldean	Burn It Down Tour	October 17, 2014	Florida Georgia Line & Tyler Farr
Jason Mraz	Tour Is a Four Letter Word Tour	August 14, 2012	Christina Perri
Jimmy Buffett & The Coral Reefer Band	A Salty Piece of Land Tour	February 26, 2005	
Jimmy Buffett & The Coral Reefer Band	Party at the End of the World Tour	November 16, 2006	
Jimmy Buffett & The Coral Reefer Band	Bama Breeze Tour	November 1, 2007	
Jimmy Buffett & The Coral Reefer Band	Bama Breeze Tour	November 3, 2007	
Jimmy Buffett & The Coral Reefer Band	Summerzcool Tour	April 25, 2009	
Jimmy Buffett & The Coral Reefer Band	Under the Big Top Tour	April 24, 2010	
Jimmy Buffett & The Coral Reefer Band	Welcome to Fin Land Tour	April 16, 2011	
Jimmy Buffett & The Coral Reefer Band	Lounging at the Lagoon Tour	March 30, 2012	
Jimmy Buffett & The Coral Reefer Band	Songs from St. Somewhere Tour	April 19, 2014	
Joe Nichols	2011 Tour	February 11, 2011	Craig Morgan
John Fogerty	2006 Tour	July 23, 2006	Willie Nelson
John Legend	Once Again Tour	October 24, 2006	Corinne Bailey Rae
John Mayer & Sheryl Crow	2006 Tour	October 12, 2006	Marjorie Fair
John Mayer	Continuum World Tour	August 7, 2007	Ben Folds & James Morrison
John Mayer	Continuum World Tour	August 30, 2008	OneRepublic
John Mayer	Battle Studies World Tour	September 10, 2010	Owl City
John Mayer	Born and Raised World Tour	September 7, 2013	Phillip Phillips
Jonas Brothers	Burnin' Up Tour	September 4, 2008	Demi Lovato
Jonas Brothers	Jonas Brothers Live	August 3, 2013	Karmin
Journey	30th Anniversary Tour	September 17, 2005	
Journey	Revelation Tour	July 30, 2008	Cheap Trick & Heart
Journey	Eclipse Tour	September 17, 2011	Foreigner & Night Ranger
Journey	Eclipse Tour	October 12, 2012	Pat Benatar & Loverboy
Steve Miller Band & Tower of Power		March 14, 2015	
Juan Gabriel	2006 Tour	March 25, 2006	
Judas Priest	Angel of Retribution Tour	June 22, 2005	Queensrÿche
Judas Priest	Epitaph World Tour	November 30, 2011	Thin Lizzy & Black Label Society
Kanye West	Glow in the Dark Tour	May 5, 2008	Rihanna, Lupe Fiasco, N.E.R.D & DJ Craze
KC's Boogie Blast		July 8, 2006	
Keith Urban	Light the Fuse Tour	October 4, 2013	Little Big Town & Dustin Lynch
Kelly Clarkson	Addicted Tour	July 1, 2006	Rooney
Kenny Chesney	Flip-Flop Summer Tour	June 2, 2007	Pat Green & Sugarland
Kenny Chesney	The Poets & Pirates Tour	August 29, 2008	LeAnn Rimes & Miranda Lambert
Kenny Chesney	Sun City Carnival Tour	August 8, 2009	Miranda Lambert & Lady Antebellum
Kid Rock & Twisted Brown Trucker	Rock 'n' Rebels II Tour	June 27, 2009	Lynyrd Skynyrd & Jonathan Tyler and the Northern Lights
Kid Rock & Twisted Brown Trucker	$20 Best Night Ever Tour	September 15, 2013	ZZ Top & Uncle Kracker
Kid Rock & Twisted Brown Trucker	Red Blooded Rock 'n' Roll Redneck Extravaganza	October 12, 2018	Brantley Gilbert, Wheeler Walker Jr.
Kid Rock & Twisted Brown Trucker	Bad Reputation Tour	June 11, 2022	Grand Funk Railroad
Kings of Leon	Come Around Sundown World Tour	September 18, 2010	The Black Keys & The Whigs
Kings of Leon	Mechanical Bull Tour	September 5, 2014	Young the Giant & Kongos
KISS & Mötley Crüe	The Tour	July 28, 2012	The Treatment
Kiss & Def Leppard	40th Anniversary Tour/Heroes Tour	July 23, 2014	Kobra and the Lotus
Lady Antebellum	Own The Night Tour	May 11, 2012	Darius Rucker & Thompson Square
Lady Antebellum	Take Me Downtown Tour	May 17, 2014	Joe Nichols & Billy Currington
Lil Wayne	I Am Music II Tour	August 3, 2011	Keri Hilson, Rick Ross, Porcelain Black, Lloyd & Far East Movement
Lil Wayne & Drake	Lil Wayne Vs. Drake Tour	September 4, 2014	
Lionel Richie	All the Hits All Night Long Tour	July 14, 2014	CeeLo Green & The Board Memberz
Luke Bryan	Dirt Road Diaries Tour	October 24, 2013	Thompson Square & Florida Georgia Line
Luke Bryan	Dirt Road Diaries Tour	October 25, 2013	Thompson Square & Florida Georgia Line
Luke Bryan	That's My Kind of Night Tour	September 25, 2014	Brett Eldredge & Kelleigh Bannen
Luke Bryan	That's My Kind of Night Tour	September 26, 2014	Lee Brice & Cole Swindell
Lúnasa	2012 Tour	March 17, 2012	
Lyle Lovett	It's Not Big It's Large Tour	June 14, 2007	k.d. lang
Marilyn Manson	Rape of the World Tour	July 27, 2007	Slayer & Bleeding Through
Maroon 5 & Train	2011 Tour	August 31, 2011	Matt Nathanson
Martina McBride	The Waking Up Laughing Tour	October 10, 2008	Jack Ingram & Jason Michael Carroll
Mary J. Blige	The Breakthrough Experience Tour	August 26, 2006	LeToya Luckett & Jaheim
Mary J. Blige	Love Soul Tour	October 11, 2008	Robin Thicke
Mavis Staples	2006 Tour	July 22, 2006	Bettye LaVette
Mayhem Festival		July 29, 2008	
Mayhem Festival		August 11, 2009	
Mayhem Festival		August 10, 2010	
Mayhem Festival		August 13, 2011	
Mayhem Festival		July 13, 2012	
Mayhem Festival		July 31, 2013	
Maze	2005 Tour	June 24, 2005	Musiq Soulchild & Bobby V
Miranda Lambert & Dierks Bentley	Locked & Reloaded Tour	September 20, 2013	Randy Rogers Band & The Cadillac 3
Montgomery Gentry	Some People Change Tour	October 14, 2006	Josh Gracin
Mötley Crüe	Farewell Tour	August 17, 2014	Alice Cooper
My Chemical Romance	Three Cheers for Sweet Revenge Tour	October 9, 2005	Alkaline Trio & Reggie and the Full Effect
The Neville Brothers	Walkin' in the Shadow of Life Tour	February 14, 2005	
Nickelback	Dark Horse Tour	April 26, 2009	Seether & Saving Abel
Nickelback	No Fixed Address Tour	March 27, 2015	Pop Evil
Nine Inch Nails & Jane's Addiction	NIN/JA Tour	May 9, 2009	Street Sweeper Social Club
Nine Inch Nails & Soundgarden	2014 Tour	August 11, 2014	The Dillinger Escape Plan
No Doubt	2009 Summer Tour	June 2, 2009	Paramore & The Sounds
Norah Jones	Feels Like Home Tour	November 12, 2004	Amos Lee
The Offspring	Summer Nationals Tour	August 14, 2014	Bad Religion, Pennywise & Stiff Little Fingers
One Direction	Up All Night Tour	June 29, 2012	Manika & Olly Murs
OneRepublic	Native Summer Tour	August 16, 2014	The Script & American Authors
OWSLA	OWSLA Music Tour	November 2, 2012	
Ozzfest		September 2, 2004	
Pacha Massive	2008 Tour	September 26, 2008	
PAETEC	PAETEC Music Tour	April 4, 2008	
PAETEC	PAETEC Music Tour	April 5, 2008	
Pitbull & Kesha	2013 North American Tour	June 28, 2013	Justice Crew & Jump Smokers!
Poison	Poison'd! Summer Tour	August 31, 2007	Ratt & Vains of Jenna
Poison	Live, Raw & Uncut Tour	July 22, 2008	Dokken & Sebastian Bach Band
Projekt Revolution		August 18, 2004	
Projekt Revolution		August 11, 2007	
Projekt Revolution		August 2, 2008	
Radiohead	In Rainbows Tour	May 6, 2008	Liars
Rascal Flatts	Here's to You Tour	June 4, 2005	Gary Allan, Keith Anderson & Blake Shelton
Rascal Flatts	Still Feels Good Tour	November 4, 2007	Jason Aldean
Rascal Flatts	Bob That Head Tour	August 16, 2008	Taylor Swift
Rascal Flatts	American Living Unstoppable Tour	July 25, 2009	Darius Rucker & Cledus T. Judd
Rascal Flatts	Nothing Like This Tour	September 25, 2010	Chris Young & Kellie Pickler
Rascal Flatts	Flatts Fest Tour	September 25, 2011	Sara Evans, Justin Moore & Easton Corbin
Rascal Flatts	Changed Tour	October 26, 2012	Little Big Town, Eli Young Band & Edens Edge
Rascal Flatts	Live & Loud Tour	June 7, 2013	The Band Perry & Cassadee Pope
Rascal Flatts	Rewind Tour	September 12, 2014	Sheryl Crow & Gloriana
RBD	Tour Celestial	November 9, 2007	
Reba McEntire	2 Hats & A Readhead Tour	April 23, 2005	Brad Paisley & Terri Clark
Reggae Sunsplash	2006 Revival Tour	August 11, 2006	
Ride Back Bike Fest		February 25, 2012	
Rihanna	Last Girl on Earth Tour	July 30, 2011	Ke$ha & Travie McCoy
Rod Stewart	2008 Tour	August 28, 2008	
Roger Waters	The Dark Side of the Moon Live	May 19, 2007	
Rush	R30: 30th Anniversary Tour	July 30, 2004	
Rush	Snakes & Arrows Tour	June 16, 2007	
Rush	Time Machine Tour	October 1, 2010	
Rush	Clockwork Angels Tour	November 3, 2012	
Sammy Hagar & The Waboritas	Livin' It Up! Tour	June 17, 2006	
Santana	Embrace Your Light Tour	May 30, 2005	Los Lonely Boys
Santana	All That I Am Tour	September 29, 2006	Salvador Santana Band
Santana	Live Your Light Tour	April 27, 2008	The Derek Trucks Band
Santana	Universal Tone Tour	July 31, 2010	Steve Winwood
Scorpions	Get Your Sting and Blackout World Tour	July 17, 2010	Ratt & The Blackout
Slipknot	Knotfest Roadshow 2019	September 4, 2019	Volbeat, Gojira, and Behemoth
Steely Dan	The Fab-Originees.com Tour	August 10, 2006	Michael McDonald
Steve Miller Band	2008 Tour	May 25, 2008	Joe Cocker
Steve Miller Band & Journey	2015 Tour	March 14, 2015	Tower of Power
Stevie Nicks	Gold Dust Tour	July 13, 2005	Vanessa Carlton
Stevie Nicks	Crystal Visions Tour	February 9, 2007	
Stevie Nicks	Soundstage Sessions Tour	June 8, 2008	
Sting	Sacred Love Tour	October 22, 2004	Annie Lennox & Dominic Miller
Sting & The Royal Philharmonic Orchestra	Symphonicity Tour	July 3, 2010	
Strange Days Festival		June 8, 2005	
Styx	Big Bang Theory Tour	September 23, 2006	Foreigner & Foghat
Styx	2009 Tour	October 30, 2009	REO Speedwagon & Night Ranger
Sugarland	The Incredible Machine Tour	October 15, 2010	Little Big Town & Randy Montana
Sugarland	In Your Hands Tour	July 27, 2012	Lauren Alaina
Super Bowl Bash		January 29, 2009	
Super Bowl Bash		January 30, 2009	
Taking Back Sunday	Where You Want to Be Tour	April 25, 2005	Anberlin & The Format
Three Days Grace	2008 Tour	March 4, 2008	Breaking Benjamin, Seether & Hurt
Tim McGraw	Live Your Voice Tour	May 9, 2008	Jason Aldean & Halfway to Hazard
Tim McGraw	Southern Voice Tour	May 7, 2010	Lady Antebellum & Love and Theft
Tim McGraw	Emotional Traffic Tour	April 29, 2011	Luke Bryan & The Band Perry
Tim McGraw	Two Lanes of Freedom Tour	May 11, 2013	Brantley Gilbert & Love and Theft
Tim McGraw	Sundown Heaven Town Tour	July 12, 2014	Cassadee Pope & Kip Moore
Toby Keith	Big Throwdown Tour	October 2, 2004	Terri Clark & Scotty Emerick
Toby Keith	Big Throwdown II Tour	August 6, 2005	Lee Ann Womack & Shooter Jennings
Toby Keith	White Trash with Money Tour	September 2, 2006	Joe Nichols & Rushlow Harris
Toby Keith	Hookin' Up & Hangin' Out Tour	August 10, 2007	Miranda Lambert & Flynnville Train
Toby Keith	Biggest & Baddest Tour	June 28, 2008	Montgomery Gentry, Carter's Chord & Mica Roberts
Toby Keith	America's Toughest Tour	June 26, 2009	Trace Adkins
Toby Keith	American Ride Tour	September 3, 2010	Trace Adkins & Jaron & The Long Road to Love
Toby Keith	Locked & Loaded Tour	October 14, 2011	Eric Church & JT Hodges
Toby Keith	Love in Overdrive Tour	September 16, 2012	Brantley Gilbert
tobyMac & The Diverse City Band	Boomin' Beyond Measure Tour	March 16, 2008	Jeremy Camp & Matthew West
Tom Petty and the Heartbreakers	2005 Tour	June 10, 2005	The Black Crowes
Tom Petty and the Heartbreakers	Mojo Tour	September 16, 2010	ZZ Top
Travis Tritt	My Honky Tonk History Tour	February 10, 2005	
Twenty One Pilots	Big Guava Music Festival	May 2, 2014	
Twenty One Pilots	WSUN 97X Next Big Thing	December 5, 2015	
Twenty One Pilots	WSUN 97X Next Big Thing	December 3, 2021	
Twenty One Pilots	The Clancy World Tour: Breach Tour	October 11, 2025	Dayglow
Underoath	They're Only Chasing Safety Tour	November 11, 2005	Thrice, Vedera & The Bled
Uproar Festival		September 5, 2010	
Uproar Festival		September 3, 2011	
Uproar Festival		September 13, 2012	
Uproar Festival		August 30, 2014	
We the Kings	Secret Valentine Tour	February 16, 2009	The Cab, The Maine, There for Tomorrow & VersaEmerge
The Who	Endless Wire Tour	March 25, 2007	Rose Hill Drive
WLLD 94.1	WiLDsplash Festival	March 21, 2009	
WQYK 99.5	Santa Blast: A Country Christmas Concert	December 2, 2012	
WSUN 97X	Nutcracker Ball	December 2, 2007	
WSUN 97X	Nutcracker Ball	December 7, 2008	
WSUN 97X	Nutcracker Ball	December 6, 2009	
WSUN 97X	Nutcracker Ball	December 5, 2010	
WSUN 97X	Nutcracker Ball	December 4, 2011	
WSUN 97X	Nutcracker Ball	December 3, 2012	
WXTB 98 Rock	Halloweenie Roast	October 27, 2012	
WXTB 98 Rock	Halloweenie Roast	October 26, 2013	
Zac Brown Band	2012 Tour	January 28, 2012	
Zac Brown Band	Uncaged Tour	February 22, 2013	Blackberry Smoke & Levi Lowrey
Zac Brown Band	Great American Road Trip Tour	May 29, 2014	Kacey Musgraves
Zac Brown Band	Great American Road Trip Tour	May 30, 2014	Kacey Musgraves

== See also ==
- List of contemporary amphitheaters
- Live Nation
