= José Manuel Gómez Vázquez Aldana =

Mexican architect (1937–2025)

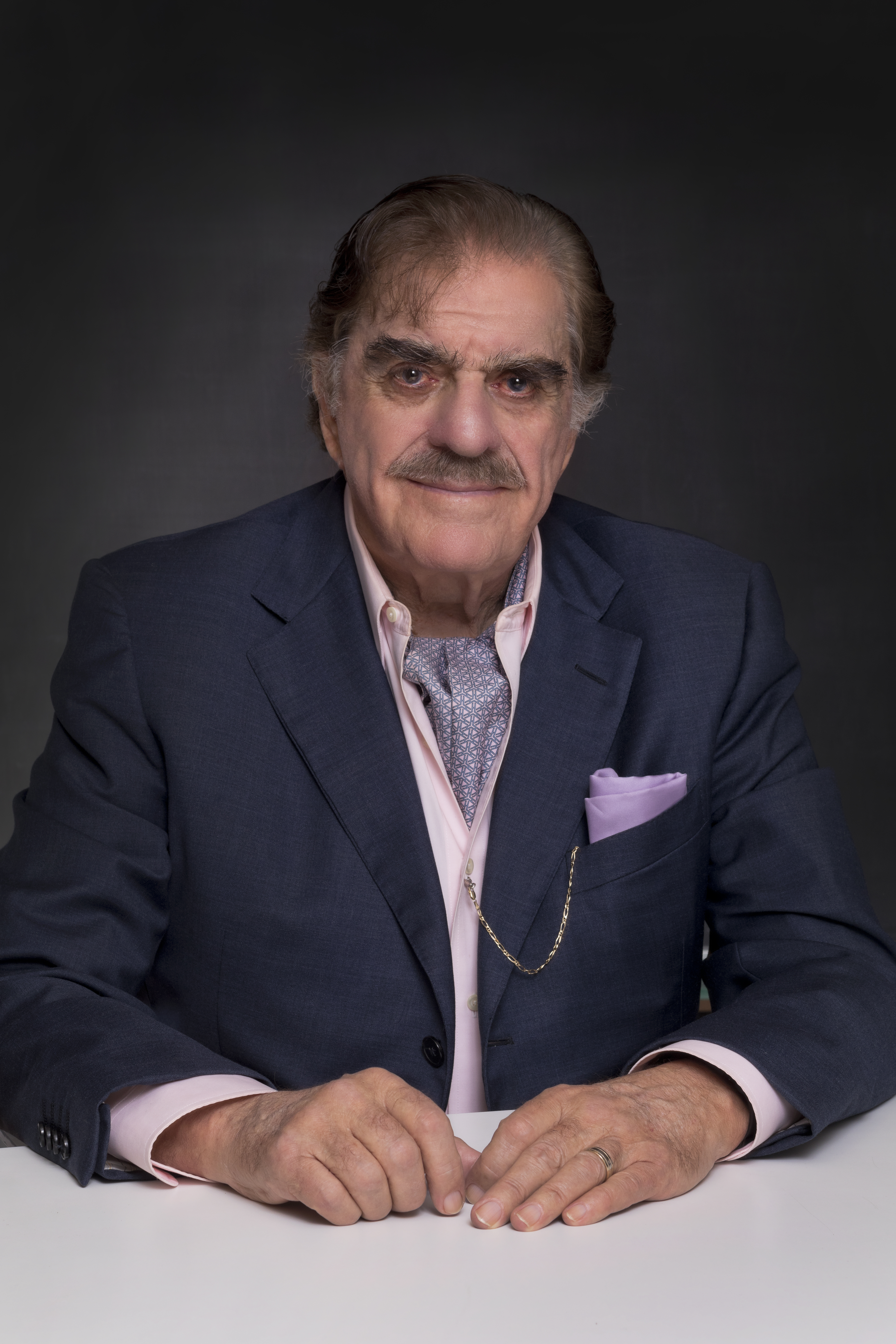
- Born: José Manuel Gómez Vázquez Aldana; 2 October 1937; Guadalajara, Jalisco, Mexico
- Died: 18 October 2025 (aged 88)
- Occupation: Architect
- Awards: International Award for Sustainable Architecture, Cemex (2005)
- Buildings: Palace of Culture and Communication (PALCCO) Guadalajara (2016)
- Projects: Global City, Panama
- Website: Gomez Vazquez International

José Manuel Gómez Vázquez Aldana (2 October 1937 – 18 October 2025) was a Mexican architect. He designed residential projects in the United States and Latin America, and was founder of the international architecture studio Gómez Vázquez International.

== Early life and education ==
Gómez Vázquez was born in Guadalajara, Jalisco on 2 October 1937. He studied architecture at the University of Guadalajara, where he was the student of the professors Bruno Cadoré, Silvio Alberti, Herrero Morales, Horst Hartung, Eric Coufal, Julio de la Peña, and Ignacio Díaz Morales. Julio de la Peña taught him to draw planes, and Díaz Morales taught him to appreciate the scope of architecture. He learned sensuality as an artistic vehicle from his contemporary Marco Aldaco, who also taught him the value of watercolor. He worked with the engineer Jorge García de Quevedo: "There were no architects, so the engineers designed their own houses. At that time I still had not finished my studies but as I had talent for designing and drawing, suddenly found myself making houses and buildings even though I had not graduated."

== Career ==
Gómez Vázquez quickly finished his degree in 1961 and set up his own studio, Taller de Arquitectura, with his brother Jaime.

In 1967 he was invited to the United States for an eleven month stay as part of the Eisenhower Exchange Fellowship. During his studies and stay in North America he met architects including Walter Gropius, Mies van der Rohe, Louis Kahn, IM Pei, Minoru Yamasaki, Skidmore, Owings & Merrill, Victor Gruen, Alvar Aalto, Morris Lapidus and Constantinos Apostolou Doxiadis, the father of ekistics and integral urban planning that already included sustainability. He spent a season with Doxiadis and visited the Athens Ekistic Center, joining the World Society for Ekistics, where he was vice-president.

Invited by the Urban Land Institute to visit some avant-garde urban and tourist developments, he met brothers Willard and James Rouse, who had just built the new city of Columbia, located between Baltimore and Washington DC.

During his studies and many trips to different cities in the United States he was named Honorary Citizen and received the key to the cities of New Orleans, Houston, Washington, and Miami. He was also Honorary Consul of Poland in Guadalajara.

He organised the first bullfight at the Astrodome, invited by former Houston mayor, Roy Hofheinz. This show was organised together with the bullfighting entrepreneur Leodegario Hernández, owner of the bullring in Guadalajara, Leon and Monterrey.

=== Gómez Vázquez International ===
After graduation in 1961, he founded Taller de Arquitectura in Guadalajara with his brother Jaime and Ernesto Escobar. During his stay in the United States, the studio already had 30 architects who designed buildings, houses, and large-scale works such as the Hotel Tapatio and the Plaza Nuevo Progreso, so he travelled to Mexico every five weeks.

In one of his trips, he decided to change the structure and image of his office, founding the firm Gómez Vázquez Aldana y Asociados, inspired by the image of Wilson, Crane & Anderson, the Houston firm that designed the Astrodome. These were fundamental in the contemporary architectural development, planning and sustainable architecture of Mexico and Latin America and pioneer of avant-garde designs and lifestyles.

With a younger generation of architects at the beginning of 2000, and with his son Juan Carlos Gómez Castellanos as director, the firm established a presence in Panama, the Dominican Republic, and Puerto Rico.

Faced with the challenges of globalisation and sustainable planning in 2013, the studio renamed to Gómez Vázquez International. It was listed among the 100 most important architecture studios worldwide by the British magazine Building Design (in position 65 of the WA 100 list).

The firm has offices in Guadalajara, Mexico City, San Antonio and Austin (Texas), and Panama, and also works in Colombia, Nicaragua, Honduras, the Dominican Republic, and Florida.

=== Urban Jal ===
In his native land of Jalisco, Gómez Vázquez played an important role in planning, urbanism, and regional development. He created the real estate Urban Jal firm that worked on subdivisions such as Jardines de la Cruz and San Miguel de la Colina. Urban Jal partnered with the Japanese corporation Marubeni, the third largest in Japan after Mitsubishi and Mitsui, creating a construction company called Surban and building Residencial la Cruz. The company shut down after the devaluation of the Mexican peso in 1993.

== Death ==
Gómez Vázquez Aldana died on 18 October 2025, at the age of 88.

== Selected projects ==
- Monumental Bullring of Jalisco, now known as Plaza Nuevo Progreso (1966–1967). It was commissioned by the bullfighting businessman Leodegario Hernández who asked him to design the project in fifteen days, after showing a sketch he disliked by another architect.
- Sanctuary of the Martyrs in Guadalajara
- Palace of Culture and Communication (PALCCO) in Zapopan, Jalisco, 2016
- Global City, urban development in 1300 hectares (Panama)
- Los Tules (Puerto Vallarta, Jalisco, 1979)
- Estadio Yaquis, a baseball stadium in Ciudad Obregón, Sonora, 2014–2016
- Reform and remodelling of Jalisco Stadium (Guadalajara, 1970)
- Tapalpa Country Club (Tapalpa, Jalisco, 1994)
- Isla Iguana (Puerto Vallarta, Jalisco, 1993)

== Awards and honours ==
- Eisenhower Fellow – Eisenhower Exchange Fellowship, United States of America (1968)
- Honorary citizen and keys of the cities: Miami, Washington, New Orleans, and Houston
- Arquitectura Jalisco Honoris Causa Prize (1993)
- Medal of Honor Adolf B. Horn Jr., Business Merit Jalisco (1990)
- Architecture Distinguished Recognition, National Tourism Sector (Concanaco) by President Fox (2005)
- International Award for Sustainable Architecture, Cemex (2005)
- Habitat Architecture and Design Award for "38 years of Excellence in Architecture and Urban Planning" (2006)
- Award of the College of Engineers and Architects State Jalisco CICEJ, Excellence in Professional Career (2011)
- Ibero-American Tribute for Professional Career of Excellence granted by the Universidad del Valle de Mexico (2013)
- Prize awarded for his long career dedicated to art and design by the Magazine Mexico Design, Guadalajara (2016)
- AAA Five Diamond Awards – Hotel Ritz Carlton Cancún (2015)
