= Plaza Nuevo Progreso =

Bullring in Guadalajara, Mexico

Plaza de toros Nuevo Progreso
- Interactive map of Plaza de toros Nuevo Progreso
- Address: Montes Pirineos 1930
- Location: Guadalajara, Jalisco
- Coordinates: 20°42′7.42″N 103°19′31.11″W
- Owner: Espectáculos Monterrey, Sociedad Anónima (EMSA)
- Capacity: 16,561
- Surface: beige sands
- Public transit: Macrobús

Construction
- Groundbreaking: 1966
- Opened: February 4, 1967 (59 years ago)
- Architect: Leopoldo Torres Águila
- Structural engineer: Mario Quiñones

The Plaza de toros Nuevo Progreso is a bullring in the Mexican city of Guadalajara, Jalisco. It is currently used for bull fighting and also for hosting musical events, and professional wrestling events. The bullring holds 16,561 people and was built in 1966 to 1967.

Architect Jose Manuel Gomez Vazquez Aldana made the executive project and drew up the plans for the new bullring, and this one was built by architects Leopoldo Torres Águila, Manuel Parga, and Gorki Guido Bayardo, and civil engineers Mario Quiñones, Alfonso Ortega Pérez, and Mario Fernández.

The main promoter and first owner of the plaza was Leodegario Hernández (Arandas, Jalisco, 24 January 1920 - 22 January 1987), a show business promoter and entrepreneur.

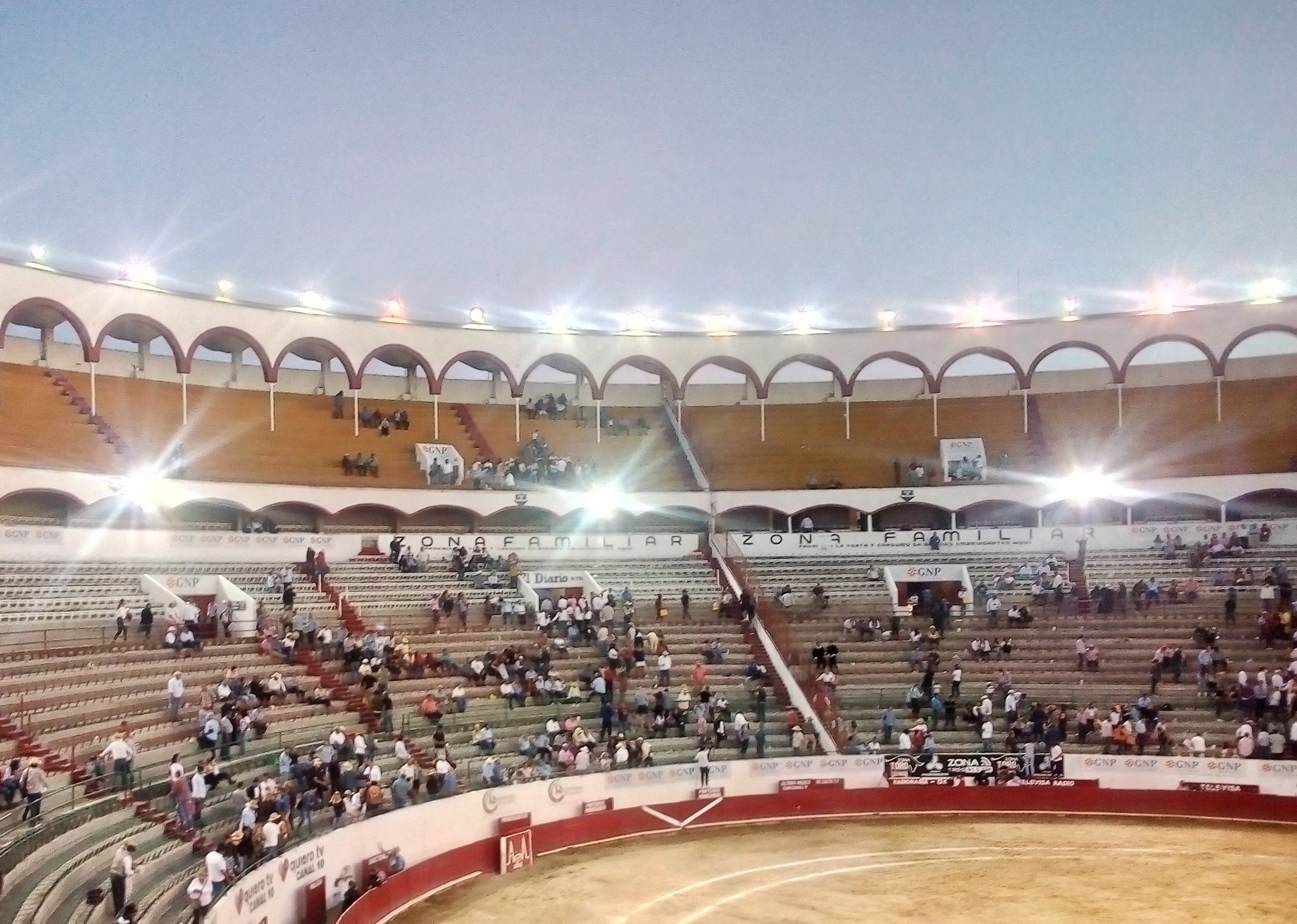
Bullring Nuevo Progreso in Guadalajara

The first name of this venue was Plaza Monumental, and was inaugurated on Saturday, 4 February 1967, when six bulls bred in the facilities of cattle breeder José Julián Llaguno, were fought by matadors Joselito Huerta, Raúl Contreras "Finito", and Manolo Martínez.

Leodegario Hernández went through a streak of bad business, and in 1971 he decided to sell the plaza to his competitor, Ignacio García-Aceves.

The bullring was remodeled in 1979 and since that year is called Nuevo Progreso.

In 1990, Espectáculos Taurinos de México, Sociedad Anónima (ETMSA), a company which a few years ago changed its name to Espectáculos Monterrey, Sociedad Anónima (EMSA) and was led by the nowadays deceased Mexican billionaire Alberto Baillères, purchased the bullring.
