= PalaTorino =

Sports arena in Turin, Italy

Coordinates: 45.10803°N 7.633889°E

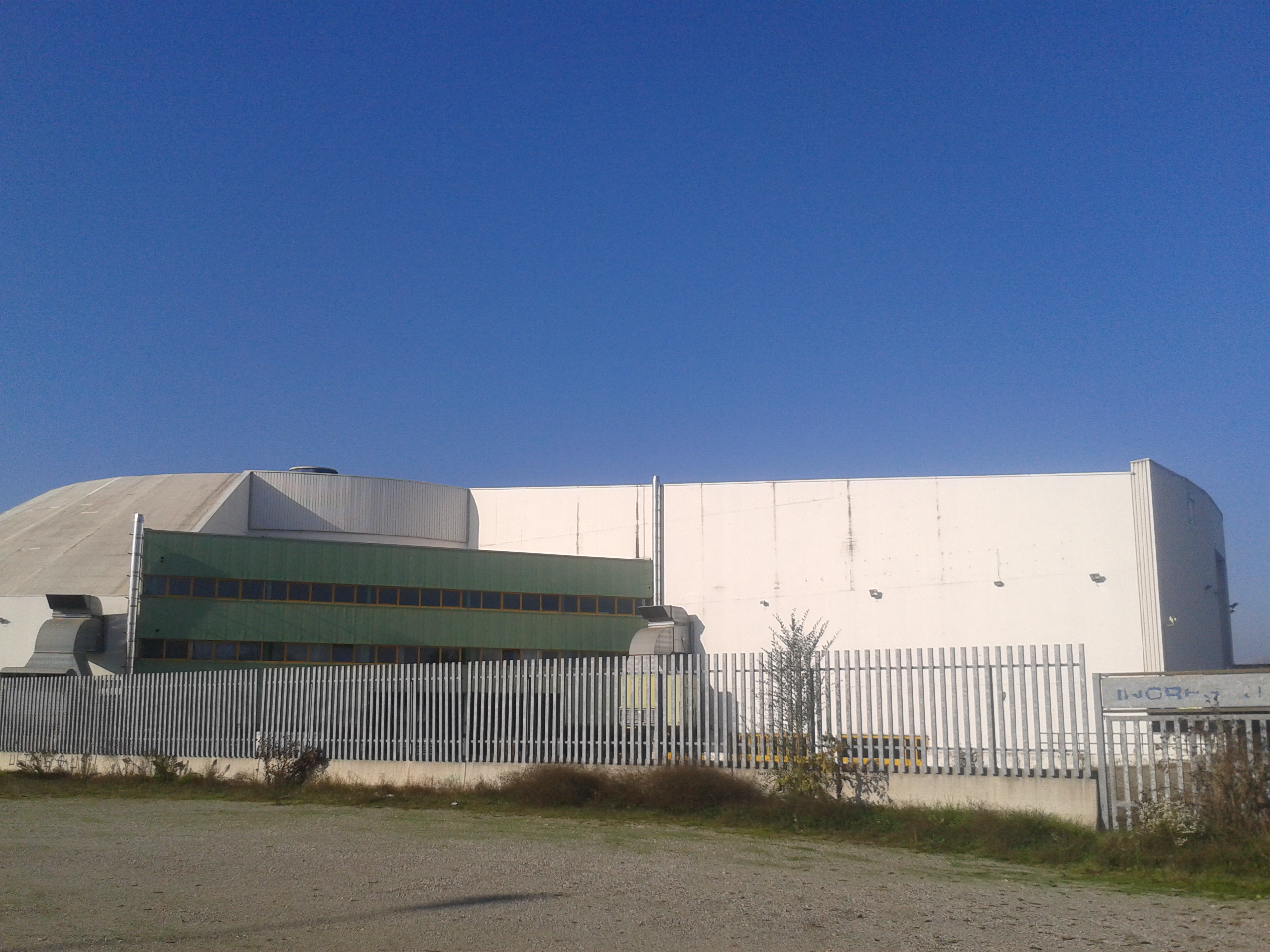
PalaTorino in November 2013

PalaTorino (formally PalaStampa and Mazda Palace) was an indoor sports arena, located in Turin, Italy. The capacity of the arena was 10,000 people. It hosted concerts and indoor sporting events.

The arena was inaugurated, as PalaStampa, in 1994 with a concert by Italian singer Adriano Celentano. Since the opening of the larger PalaOlimpico for the 2006 Winter Olympics, in December 2005, the PalaTorino has been rarely used, and the city of Turin decided to close this venue in 2011.
