= Toyota Pavilion at Concord =

Amphitheatre in Concord, California, US

Coordinates: 37°57′34.2″N 121°56′17.8″W

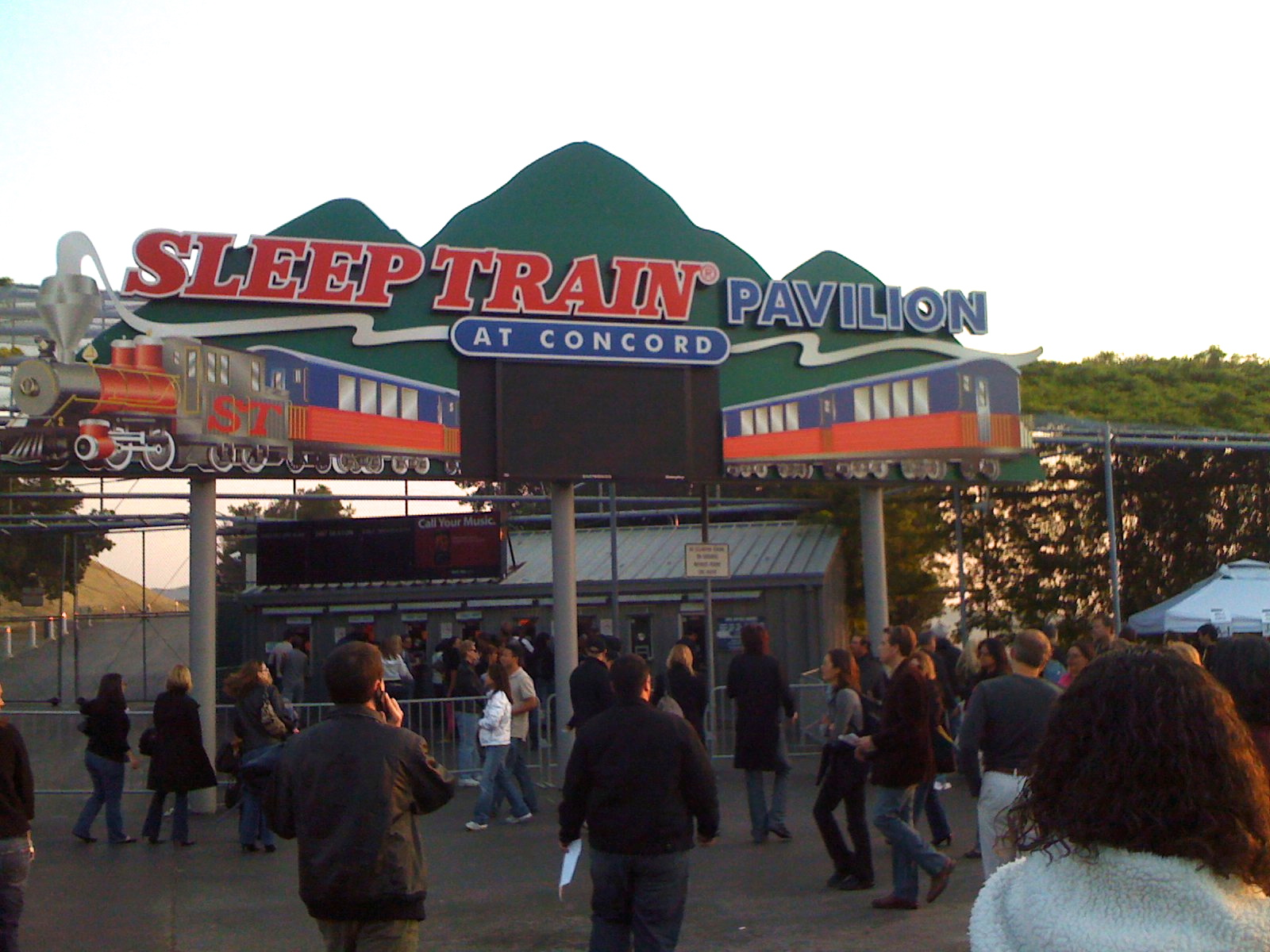
- Facade in 2008
- Interactive map of Toyota Pavilion at Concord
- Former names: Concord Pavilion (1975–2000; 2013-2023); Chronicle Pavilion (2000–06); Sleep Train Pavilion (2006–13)
- Address: 2000 Kirker Pass Rd; Concord, CA 94521-1642
- Location: San Francisco Bay Area
- Owner: City of Concord
- Operator: Live Nation
- Capacity: 12,500

Construction
- Opened: May 1975
- Expanded: 1995

Toyota Pavilion at Concord (formerly known as Concord Pavilion) is an amphitheatre located in Concord, California. It is owned by the City of Concord and operated by Live Nation. The Pavilion has a capacity of 12,500 people and opened in 1975 as the Concord Pavilion. It is used for concerts, local community events (including an annual jazz festival) and local high school graduations.

The Pavilion was designed by architect Frank Gehry and landscape architect Peter Walker. Gehry also designed its 1996 renovation and expansion, which included more parking and seats. The venue has hosted numerous professional musical acts over the years of its operation and continues to do so to this day. Bing Crosby played his last US concert at the Pavilion on August 16, 1977, the day another American music icon, Elvis Presley died. Lawrence Welk's appearance at the Concord Pavilion on June 13, 1982, was billed as his farewell performance. Legendary concert promoter Bill Graham was killed in a 1991 helicopter crash after leaving a concert at the Pavilion by Huey Lewis and the News, having just discussed with the band about organizing a benefit for the victims of that year's fire in the Oakland Hills; Graham's production company, Bill Graham Presents (BGP), had been the booking agent for the Concord Pavilion since 1985.

In a deal with the city of Concord, Bill Graham Presents took over operations of the facility in February 2000. Shortly thereafter, its name was changed to the Chronicle Pavilion at Concord, following the purchase of the naming rights by the business agent of the San Francisco Chronicle, the San Francisco Newspaper Agency. BGP was purchased in 2000, along with its parent, SFX Promotions, by Clear Channel Communications; in 2005, Clear Channel would spin off its concert operations into Live Nation, which operates the Pavilion to this day.

The Pavilion changed its name in April 2006, when it became the Sleep Train Pavilion after the California-based mattress retailer (now a Houston, Texas-based company) purchased the naming rights; by 2017 the retailer folded into Mattress Firm.

In December 2013, as part of a 10-year contract renewal between Venue Nation (previously known as Live Nation) and the City of Concord, the Pavilion's name was changed again to the Concord Pavilion.

On August 3, 2023, the Pavilion was renamed Toyota Pavilion at Concord after the local Northern California Toyota Dealers Association, which consists of 58 local Toyota dealers operating in the northern half of the state, purchased the naming rights.

The inaugural High School Battle of the Bands for high school students took place in 2006 and the winner was Poster Boy, consisting of brothers Tyler and Clint Cornfield.

== See also ==
- List of contemporary amphitheatres
- List of works by Frank Gehry
- Sleep Train Amphitheatre (disambiguation)
- San Francisco Bay Area
