= North Island Credit Union Amphitheatre =

Concert venue in California, US

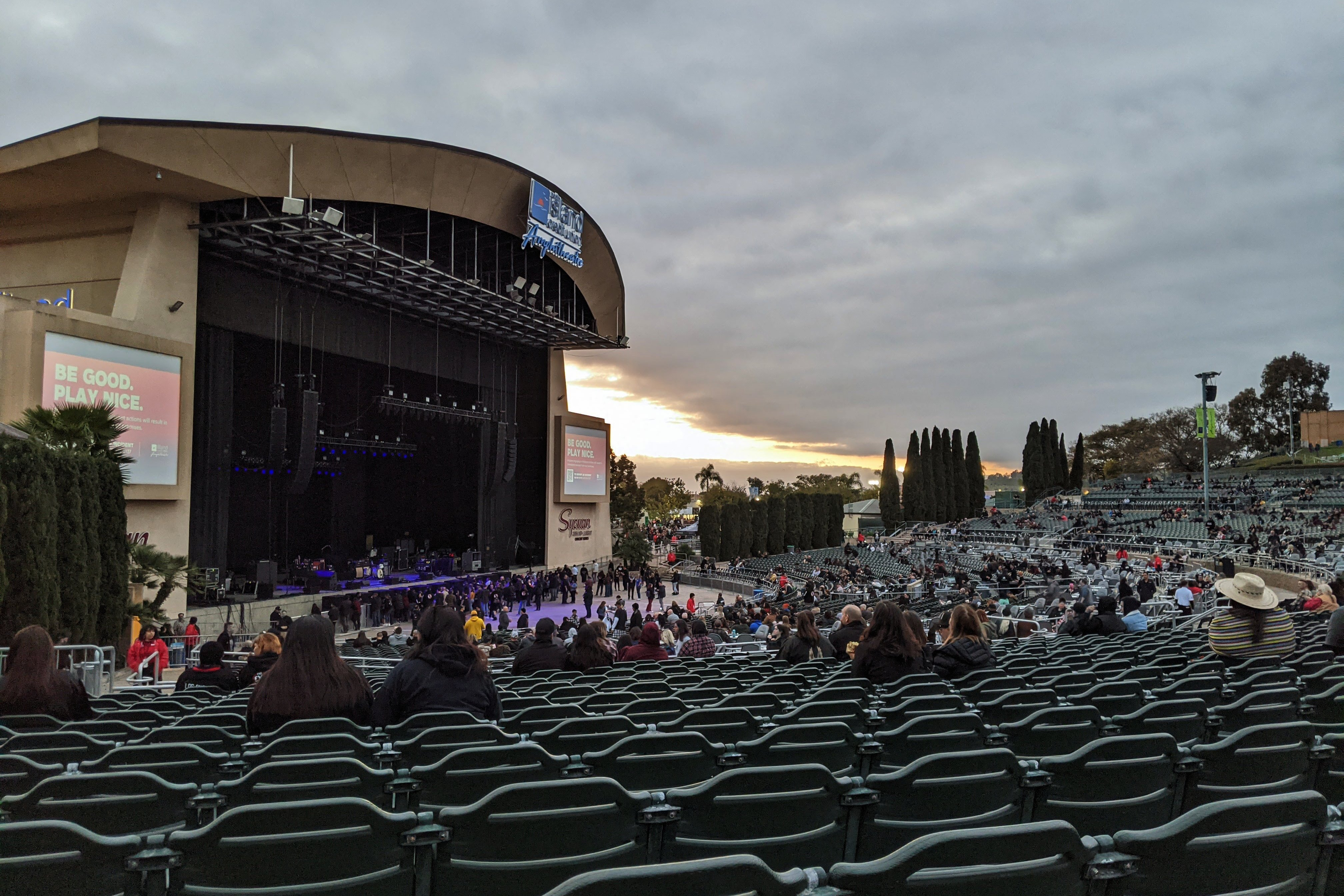
- Interior of the amphitheatre before a concert in 2024
- Interactive map of North Island Credit Union Amphitheatre
- Former names: Coors Amphitheatre (1998–2008); Cricket Wireless Amphitheatre (2008–2012); Sleep Train Amphitheatre (2012–2017); Mattress Firm Amphitheatre (2017-2018)
- Address: 2050 Entertainment Cir; Chula Vista, CA 91911
- Location: Chula Vista, California
- Coordinates: 32.587778°N 117.006389°W
- Owner: Live Nation Entertainment
- Capacity: 20,500
- Type: Amphitheatre

Construction
- Opened: July 21, 1998

North Island Credit Union Amphitheatre from 100 section.

North Island Credit Union Amphitheatre is an amphitheatre in Chula Vista, California. It is one of the larger concert venues in the San Diego area. The venue is currently owned and operated by Live Nation Entertainment.

== History ==
The area around the amphitheatre had previously been open fields and was once part of a large dairy farm. At one point, the 72 acres where the amphitheater sits was a fully developed industrial park with terraced lots and utilities in place. The site had been abandoned for a number of years when Universal Concerts approached the city of Chula Vista and won approval to build the amphitheatre. The industrial park was bulldozed and the site graded to build the amphitheatre.

In the late 1990s, a development plan was created, and a water park and concert venue were planned for the area. White Water Canyon (now Sesame Place San Diego) opened in 1997, while the amphitheatre, then Coors Amphitheatre, opened on July 21, 1998, the first venue of its kind in San Diego County. On August 21, 1998, the venue hosted its first sell-out concert with the English pop girl group Spice Girls.

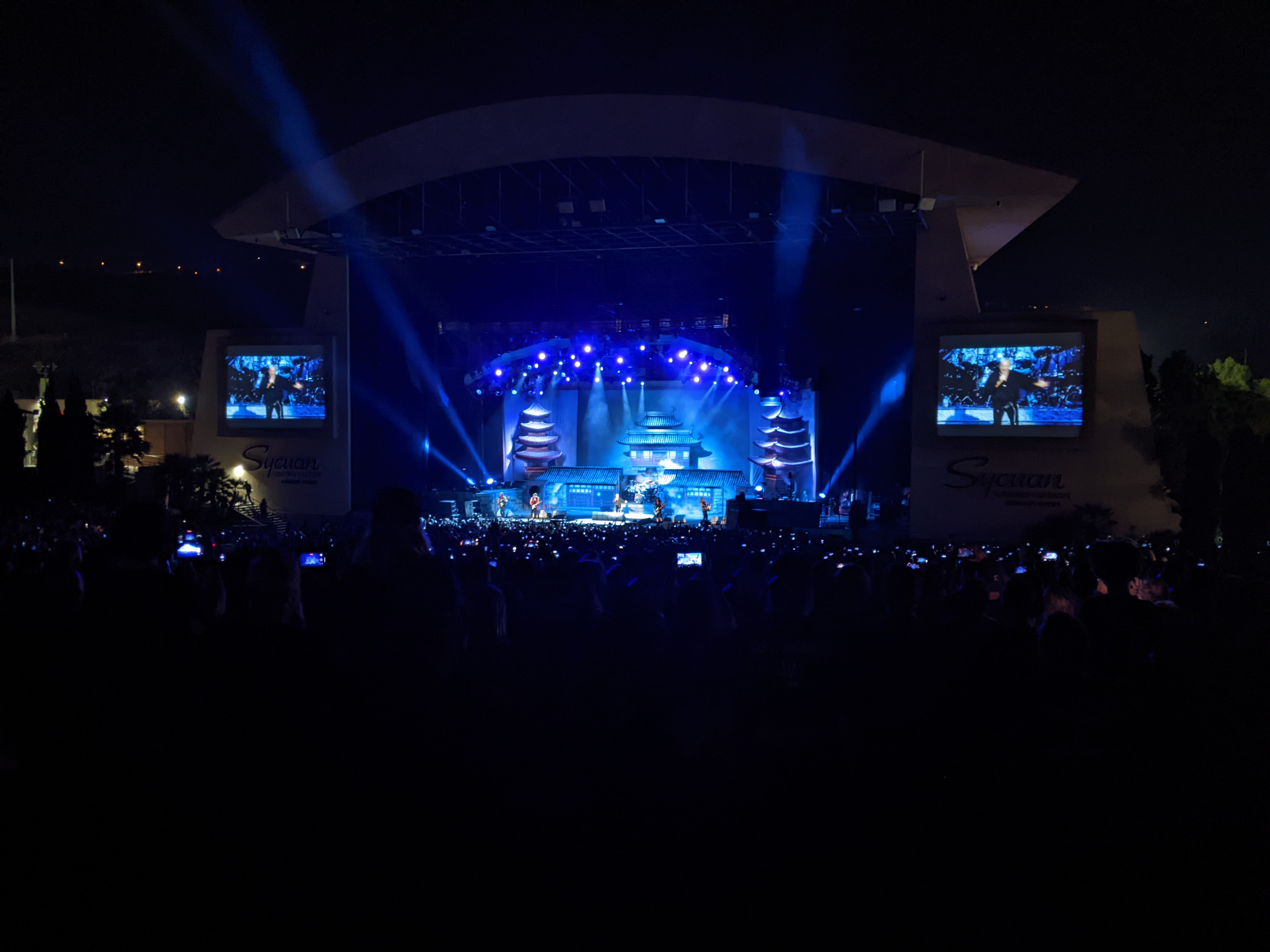
Iron Maiden performing at the amphitheatre in 2022

All of the Universal Concerts facilities, including Coors Amphitheatre, were purchased by House of Blues in late 1999. Live Nation Entertainment purchased House of Blues, including eight amphitheaters and 11 clubs, in July 2006. In April 2008, the venue was renamed Cricket Wireless Amphitheatre after naming rights were purchased by Cricket Wireless. In January 2013, the venue was renamed to Sleep Train Amphitheatre after the naming rights were purchased by Sleep Train, as part a five-year naming rights deal with Live Nation. On February 16, 2017, Sleep Train Amphitheatre was renamed to Mattress Firm Amphitheatre, to coincide with its acquisition by Mattress Firm. On November 1, 2018, the venue was renamed to North Island Credit Union Amphitheatre, as the naming rights were purchased by Live Nation. It was in part of a ten-year name-in-title sponsorship deal with North Island Credit Union of San Diego.

Among the artists that have performed here are Destiny's Child, Bring Me the Horizon, Duran Duran, Danny Elfman, Earth, Wind & Fire, Falling in Reverse, Iron Maiden, Kiss, Marilyn Manson, Pantera, Peso Pluma, Phish, Pitbull, Slipknot, Spice Girls, T-Pain, The Cure and The Smashing Pumpkins.

== Venue ==
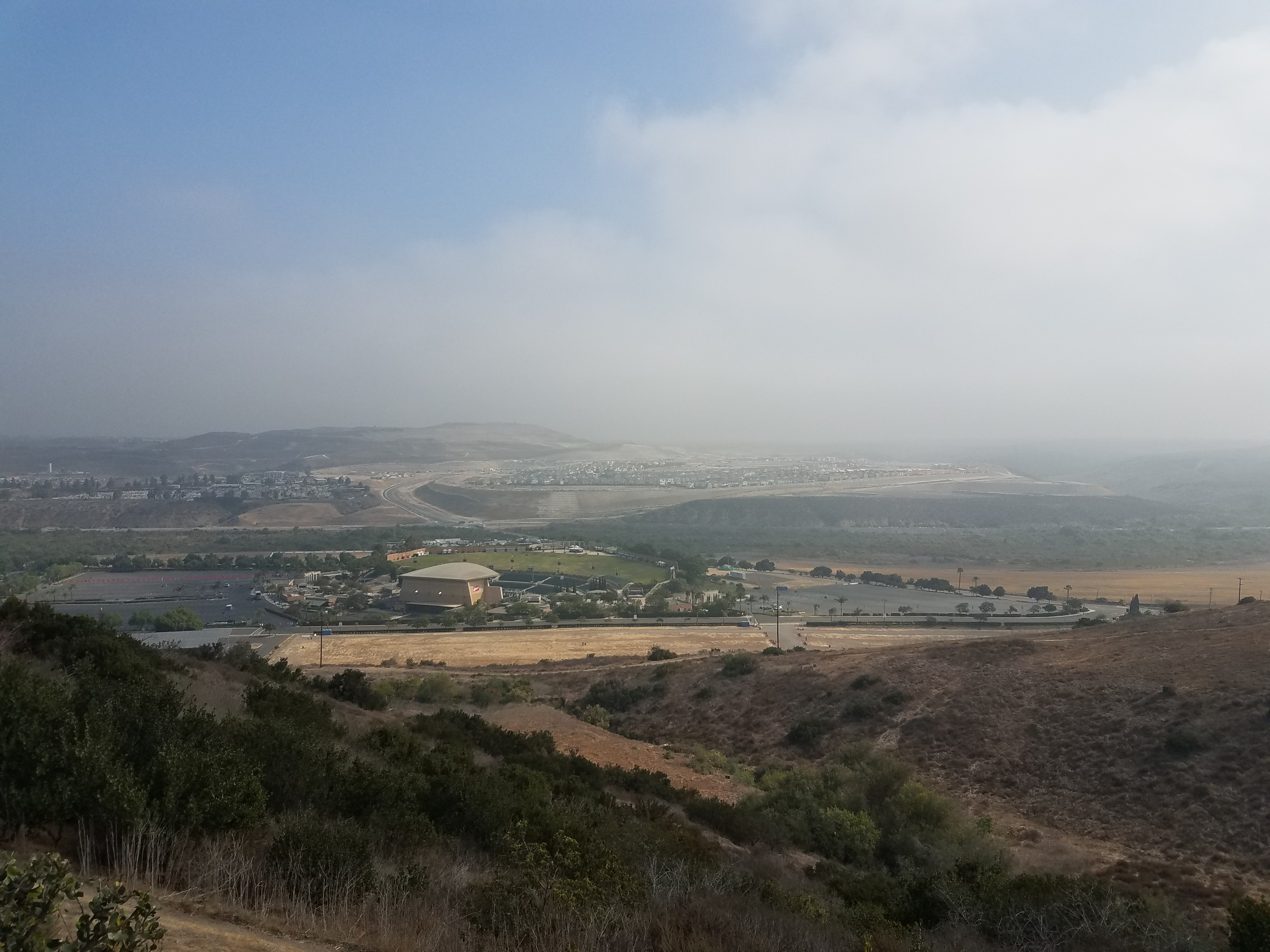
North Island Credit Union Amphitheatre as seen from the south.

The venue features 9,468 chair-back seats and 10,024 lawn seats. During the spring, summer and fall months it is used mostly for first-tier concert tours, due primarily to its capacity.

== See also ==
- List of contemporary amphitheatres
