= List of Latin American rock musicians =

This is a list of Latin American rock musicians.

- ? and the Mysterians, from 1962 to present
- Zayra Alvarez, Puerto Rican singer-songwriter
- Angra, Brazilian heavy metal band
- Aterciopelados, Colombian band
- Cedric Bixler of The Mars Volta
- Café Tacuba, Mexican alternative band
- Cannibal & the Headhunters, "Land of a Thousand Dances" Mexican-American band out of East LA
- Capsula, Argentinian rock n roll band
- Roberto Carlos, Brazilian singer-songwriter
- Contracorriente, Peruvian hardcore punk band
- Cruzados
- Da Lata
- Dolores Delirio, Peruvian alternative post punk band
- Alejandro Escovedo, singer, songwriter
- Los Fabulosos Cadillacs
- Flema, Peruvian punk garage rock band
- Oz Fox (Ricardo Martinez), guitarist, Stryper, Sin Dizzy, Vinyl Tattoo
- Charly Garcia, Argentine singer
- Erica Garcia, Argentine singer-songwriter
- Ely Guerra, Mexican singer-songwriter
- Cachorro Grande, Brazilian retro 1960s and 1970s rock n roll
- Los Hermanos, Brazilian Latin/alternative rock band
- Ill Niño, alternative metal band
- Jaguares, Mexico
- Los Jaivas, Chilean rock band
- Leusemia, Peruvian punk rock band
- La Ley, Chilean band
- Líbido, Peruvian alternative band
- Los Bunkers, Chilean band
- Los Lobos, band
- Los Lonely Boys, Mexican-American power trio
- Lucybell, Chilean band
- Maldita Vecindad, band
- Malo, Mexican band, including Carlos Santana's brother
- Maná, Mexican band
- Massacration, Brazilian heavy metal band
- Molotov, Mexican Spanglish band
- Os Mutantes, Brazilian 1960s progressive rock
- Ozomatli
- P.O.D, Latino rap/rock band
- Daryl Palumbo of Glassjaw (American hardcore band)
- Panda or Pxndx, Mexican band
- David Peel
- Chris Pérez
- Pedro Suarez Vertiz, retired Peruvian rock artist, lead singer of Arena Hash
- Pierce The Veil, post-hardcore Latino band from San Diego
- The Plugz
- Los Prisioneros, Chilean classic rock band
- Project46, Brazilian death metal band
- Puya
- Rata Blanca, Argentine power metal/hard rock band
- The ReAktion Chilean alternative Rock, Nu metal
- Redbone The Vegas Brothers formed the Mexican-American/Native American funk rock band, Redbone
- Omar Rodriguez-Lopez of At the Drive-In, The Mars Volta, Bosnian Rainbows (emo-punk, progressive rock)
- Draco Rosa, singer, musician, songwriter
- Domingo Samudio, 'Sam' of Sam the Sham & the Pharaohs. Born in Texas, but of Mexican heritage.
- Carlos Santana, Mexican songwriter, guitarist
- Seguida
- Sepultura, Brazilian thrash metal band
- Soda Stereo, Argentine rock band
- Soulfly, Brazilian alternative metal band
- Lynda Thomas, retired Mexican alternative rock musician of the 1990s and 2000s
- Transmetal, Mexican death metal band
- Ritchie Valens, a pioneer of the Spanish-speaking rock and roll movement
- Andrew Velasquez, lead vocals for post-hardcore band, Crown the Empire
- Julieta Venegas, singer-songwriter
- The Zeros
