= Knotfest =

Metal festival held by rock band Slipknot

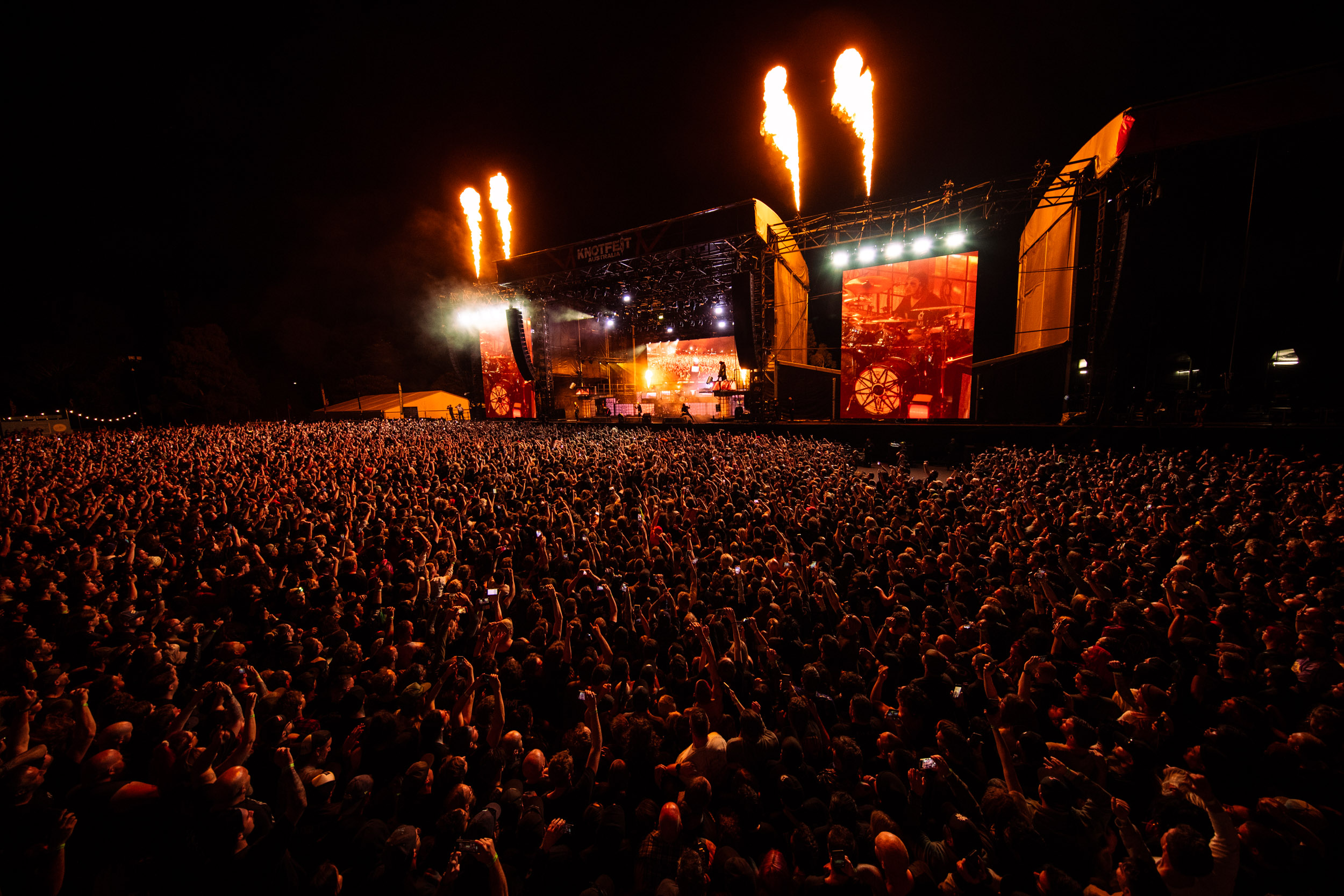
- Knotfest Australia 2023
- Genre: Heavy metal; groove metal; death metal; metalcore; deathcore; thrash metal; nu metal; alternative metal; black metal; deathgrind; hip hop
- Locations: Council Bluffs, Iowa (2012); Somerset, Wisconsin (2012); San Bernardino, California (2014–2017); Chiba, Japan (2014, 2016, 2023); Toluca, Mexico (2015–2017); Bogotá, Colombia (2018–2019, 2021–present); Mexico City, Mexico (2019); Clisson, France (2019); Indianola, Iowa (2021); Los Angeles, California (2021); Oberhausen, Germany (2022); Turku, Finland (2022); Buenos Aires, Argentina (2022); Santiago, Chile (2022, 2024); São Paulo, Brazil (2022, 2024); Melbourne, Australia (2023-present); Sydney, Australia (2023-present); Brisbane, Australia (2023-present); Des Moines, Iowa (2024); Buenos Aires, Argentina (2024); Santiago, Chile (2024); São Paulo, Brazil (2024); Mexico City, Mexico (2025)
- Years active: 2012; 2014–2019; 2021–present
- Website: www.knotfest.com; knotfestjapan.com; knotfestmexico.com

Knotfest is a music festival created in 2012 by American heavy metal band Slipknot and their longtime manager and CEO of 5B Artist Management, Cory Brennan. The event has been held both as a destination festival and touring festival in several countries including the United States, Canada and Mexico in North America; Argentina, Brazil, Chile and Colombia in South America; Finland, France, Germany, United Kingdom* in Europe, Japan in Asia; and Australia.

Aside from Slipknot, Knotfest has featured a diverse alumni of past performers including metal acts Korn, Deftones, Bring Me the Horizon, Avenged Sevenfold, Limp Bizkit, Lamb of God, Gojira, Judas Priest, Bad Omens; Hardcore bands Turnstile and Knocked Loose; Hip-Hop acts $UICIDEBOY$ and Ghostface Killah and many more

== History ==
=== Creation ===
Knotfest was officially announced on June 4, 2012. Among the activities, the festival offered as part of its "dark carnival experience" were circus big-top tents, pillars of fire, amusement park rides, burlesque performers, firebreathers, stilt walkers, drum circles made of junkyard cars and graffiti walls. The two shows also debuted a Slipknot museum.

"It's all about having fun and going crazy, bringing it to the standard it used to be," Slipknot's Shawn "Clown" Crahan told Rolling Stone. "It's time for us to really engulf this idea known as Knotfest where we're in control, we make a day devoted to our mindset, our ideas, the people that we want to play with, the people that we think our fans want to be around... When everyone leaves their senses [will be] overloaded, and I'm talking about smells, sights, hearing, your body, everything is overloaded with stimulation, because that's what Slipknot does."

The inaugural Knotfest was a two-city event and took place on August 17, 2012, in Council Bluffs, Iowa, and August 18, 2012, in Somerset, Wisconsin. Among the line-up were bands such as Deftones, Lamb of God, and Cannibal Corpse. On March 24, 2014, it was officially announced that "Knotfest Japan" would be held in November 15 and 16 at Makuhari Messe, Tokyo. Headliners were Slipknot, Korn, Limp Bizkit, Lamb of God, Five Finger Death Punch, Papa Roach, Bring Me the Horizon, Trivium and In Flames. On the first date of the Mayhem Festival 2014, Knotfest 2014 was announced, with it being held at the San Manuel Amphitheater in San Bernardino, California, on October 24–26. Knotfest 2015 was to be held at the same location, from October 23 through 25. In December 2019, it was announced that Knotfest would be held in the United Kingdom for the first time in 2020.

=== Broadcast ===
On July 11, Slipknot announced that their closing performance at Knotfest would be broadcast via a pay-per-view streaming website. Shawn "Clown" Crahan said, "It means everything for everyone to see the live spectacle we're creating in the flesh, but we understand some fans around the world can't be at the show. We've now made it possible for you to be there in spirit - so join us live on August 18."

== Website ==
On May 27, 2020, Slipknot and 5B Management relaunched the Knotfest website as a "global media hub" for news, interviews and more.

Knotfest launched Hardlore: Stories from Tour hosted by Colin Young and Bo Lueders on March 22, 2022. The series is routinely in the Top 25 of Music Podcast charts and the top weekly heavy music podcast

The Knotfest site is home to She's With the Band, a weekly podcast hosted by Tori Kravitz that focuses on women in the music industry.

In addition, Knotfest is the home to the guitar driven interview series, Defender of the Riff hosted by Daniel Dekay which has appeared live at Blue Ridge Rock Festival and will be appearing at Download Festival in 2025; as well as the behind the scenes docu-series Beyond the Breakdown hosted by Tori Kravitz.

== Performers ==
=== 2012 line-up ===
Friday 17 August		Saturday 18 August	
Main Stage	Second Stage	Main Stage	Second Stage
Slipknot; Deftones; Serj Tankian; Prong	Lamb of God; Machine Head; The Urge; Dirtfedd	Slipknot; Deftones; Serj Tankian; The Dillinger Escape Plan	Lamb of God; Machine Head; Cannibal Corpse; Disconnect Hardcore (Ph); Prong; Gojira

=== 2014 line-up ===
==== California ====
Friday 24 October
Stage 002	Stage 003	Campground Stage
Suicide Silence; Butcher Babies; Alterbeast	The Black Dahlia Murder; Chelsea Grin	The Athiarchists

Saturday 25 October
Rockstar Energy Drink Main Stage	Stage 002	Stage 003	Headbang for the Highway Stage 004	Extreme Stage 005	Campground Stage
Slipknot; Danzig; Anthrax; Black Label Society; Hatebreed	Testament; Carcass; Maximum the Hormone; King 810; Man with a Mission	In This Moment; The Devil Wears Prada; Butcher Babies; Miss May I One Ok Rock	The Faceless; Stands with Fists; Dehumanizer; Kings of Carnage; Play for Blood; Shortfuse	Fear Factory; Otep; Prong; Amen; Immolation	The Athiarchists

Sunday 26 October
Rockstar Energy Drink Main Stage	Stage 002	Stage 003	Headbang for the Highway Stage 004	Extreme Stage 005	Campground Stage
Slipknot; Five Finger Death Punch; Volbeat; Tech N9ne; Atreyu; Hellyeah	Of Mice & Men; DevilDriver; Veil of Maya; Nothing More	Killswitch Engage; Whitechapel; Upon a Burning Body; Anti Mortem	Dead for Denver; Motograter; Fire from the Gods; I, of Helix; A Threat to the Enemy; Still Not Dead	Napalm Death; Avatar; Attika 7 Exmortus; Rattlehead	The Athiarchists

==== Japan ====
Saturday 15 November	Sunday 16 November
Slipknot; Limp Bizkit; Lamb of God; Papa Roach; Bring Me the Horizon; Miss May I One Ok Rock; SiM; Crossfaith coldrain Meaning; Crystal Lake; HenLee	Slipknot; Korn; Trivium; In Flames; Five Finger Death Punch; Amon Amarth; Maximum the Hormone; Man with a Mission; Wagdug Futuristic Unity; AA= Knock Out Monkey; Make My Day; Silhouette from the Skylit

=== 2015 line-up ===
==== California ====
Friday 23 October
VIP + Camping Kickoff Party

Sepultura
The Faceless
Rings of Saturn
Khaotika
Motorbreath

Saturday 24 October
Rockstar Energy Drink Main Stage	Stage 002	Stage 003	Extreme Stage 004	Headbang for the Highway Stage 005	Campground Stage
Judas Priest; Korn; Mastodon; Trivium; Corrosion of Conformity	Body Count; At the Gates; Red Fang; Battlecross	Gwar; Born of Osiris; Earth Crisis; Goatwhore	Kataklysm; Belphegor; Inquisition; Abysmal Dawn; Her Name in Blood; Khaotika	Fire from the Gods; Buried Under Texas; Doomsday Mourning; Born for War; A Tragedy at Hand; Grand Lord High Master; Piece in Terror; Short Fuse; Green as Emerald; Kaustik; Skyburial; This Place Is a Zoo; Chasing the Bullet	Street Drum Corps

Sunday 25 October
Rockstar Energy Drink Main Stage	Stage 002	Stage 003	Extreme Stage 004	Headbang for the Highway Stage 005	Campground Stage
Slipknot; Bring Me the Horizon; Clutch; Ghostface Killah; Mobb Deep	Suicidal Tendencies; All That Remains; Beartooth; Kyng	Cannibal Corpse; Helmet; Snot; Devour the Day	Dying Fetus; Disgorge; Internal Bleeding; Green Death; The ReAktion; Kings of Carnage	I, of Helix; Proletariat; Avoid the Void; Abhor; A Threat to the Enemy; Stands with Fists; Paranova; Everybody Panic! As Oceans; Dead Animal Assembly Plant; Speaking with Ghost; Xero for Life; The Darkest Day	Street Drum Corps

==== Mexico ====
Saturday 5 December
Main Stage	Tecate Stage
Slipknot; Megadeth; Lamb of God; HIM; A Day to Remember; Trivium; Atreyu; Asking Alexandria; Tanus	Cradle of Filth; Ill Niño; The Dillinger Escape Plan; Brujeria; Resorte; 36 Crazyfists; Here Comes the Kraken; Everyone Likes Cathleen

=== 2016 line-up ===
==== "Ozzfest Meets Knotfest" California ====
Friday 23 September

Armored Saint
Metal Church
Exmortus
Thrown into Exile

Saturday 24 September
Lemmy Stage	Monster Energy Drink Stage 001	Monster Energy Drink Stage 002	Nuclear Blast Stage
Black Sabbath; Disturbed; Megadeth; Opeth; Black Label Society; Rival Sons	Suicidal Tendencies; DevilDriver; Huntress	Hatebreed; Goatwhore; Allegaeon	Municipal Waste; Brujeria; Kataklysm; The Shrine; Still Rebel

Sunday 25 September
Lemmy Stage	Rockstar Energy Drink Stage 001	Rockstar Energy Drink Stage 002	Nuclear Blast Stage
Slipknot; Slayer; Amon Amarth; Anthrax; Trivium; Motionless in White	Sabaton; Suicide Silence; Butcher Babies	Overkill; Emmure; Man with a Mission	Whitechapel; Combichrist; Carnifex; Loathe; SiM; ONI; Westfield Massacre

==== Mexico ====
Saturday 15 October
Main Stage	Iowa Stage
Avenged Sevenfold; Slayer; Marilyn Manson; Disturbed; Chevelle; Alesana; Attila; S7N	Meshuggah; Killswitch Engage; Sevendust; Hatebreed; DevilDriver; The Black Dahlia Murder; Volumes; Arcadia Libre

Sunday 16 October
Main Stage	Iowa Stage
Slipknot; Deftones; The Offspring; Ministry; Enter Shikari; Emmure; Thell Barrio; Fire from the Gods	Opeth; Arch Enemy; Iced Earth; Carcass; Animals as Leaders; Agora; Nothing More; Sabrina Sabrok; Joliette

==== Japan ====
Saturday 5 November	Sunday 6 November
Slipknot; Deftones; Disturbed; A Day to Remember; Hoobastank; Issues; SiM; Rize; Rottengraffty; Oldcodex coldrain Crystal Lake; A Crowd of Rebellion; Survive Said the Prophet; Jealkb; The Sixth Lie	Slipknot; Marilyn Manson; Lamb of God; In Flames; Anthrax; Butcher Babies; Man with a Mission the GazettE; Crossfaith; MUCC; Her Name in Blood; Crazy N' Sane; THE冠 (THE Kanmuri) 魔法少女になり隊 (Mahō Shōjo ni Nari-tai) 彼女 in the Display (Kanojo in the Display); Salty Dog

=== 2017 line-up ===
==== Mexico ====
Saturday 28 October
Tecate Stage	Day of the Gusano Stage	The Maggots Stage
A Perfect Circle; Korn; Stone Sour; Bullet for My Valentine; Cannibal Corpse; Ill Niño; Maximum the Hormone; Deadly Apples; Cerberus	Anthrax; Children of Bodom; Hatebreed; Suicide Silence; S7N; Here Comes the Kraken; Lack of Remorse	Anti-Flag; Periphery; Tech N9ne; Attila; ONI; Parazit

==== Ozzfest Meets Knotfest 2017 ====
Friday November 3

Monster Magnet
Brant Bjork
Sasquatch
Lo-Pain

Saturday 4 November
Lemmy Stage	Monster Energy Drink Stage 001	Monster Energy Drink Stage 002	Nuclear Blast Stage
Ozzy Osbourne; Prophets of Rage; Deftones; Children of Bodom; Orange Goblin	Kreator; Baroness; High on Fire; Iron Reagan	1349; Havok; Tombs; Night Demon; Thrown into Exile	Municipal Waste; Possessed; Kataklysm; Suffocation; Rings of Saturn

Sunday 5 November
Lemmy Stage	Rockstar Energy Drink Stage 001	Rockstar Energy Drink Stage 002	Nuclear Blast Stage
Rob Zombie; Marilyn Manson; Stone Sour; Eighteen Visions; Prayers	Testament; The Black Dahlia Murder; Code Orange; Stitched Up Heart; Goatwhore	Life of Agony; Upon a Burning Body; Death Angel; Oni; Ded	Sid Wilson of Slipknot; Repulsion; Exhumed; Warbringer; Ghoul; Zombie Eating Horse

=== 2018 line-up ===
==== Colombia ====
Friday 26 October

Judas Priest
Helloween
Kreator
Arch Enemy
Masacre
Iron Reagan
Revocation
Goatwhore
Kilcrops
Under Threat
Cuentos de los Hermanos Grind
Pitbull

==== Mexico ====
Canceled due to lack of organization.

=== 2019 line-up ===
==== Knotfest meets Hellfest 2019 France ====
Thursday 20 June

Slipknot
Rob Zombie
Sabaton
Amon Amarth
Papa Roach
Powerwolf
Behemoth
Ministry
Sick of It All
Amaranthe

==== Knotfest Roadshow 2019 USA & Canada ====
Lineup

Slipknot
Volbeat
Gojira
Behemoth

==== Knotfest meets Forcefest 2019 Mexico ====
Knotfest 30 November
Main Stage	Tecate Stage	Monster Energy Stage	Prudence Stage
Slipknot (cancelled); Evanescence (cancelled); Cherry Bombs; Behemoth; Stratovarius; Chelsea Grin; Carajo; Tanus; Here Comes the Kraken; Matherya	Godsmack; Bullet for My Valentine; Papa Roach; Nothing More; Of Mice & Men; Cemican; Never Again; Headcrusher; Kaizan	311; Suicidal Tendencies; The Bronx; 8 Kalacas; Las Poker; Project46; Arcadia Libre; Parazit; Hate Bullets; Hankside	Carcass; Belphegor; Gore and Carnage; Clandestino; The Suffering; Stone Leek; Rejexion; Ubon; Torcido Monkey Dream; Dethdealers; The Legion of Hetheria; AFK

==== Colombia ====
Friday 6 December
Knot Stage	Carnaval Stage	Alternative Stage
Slipknot; Behemoth; Testament; Unleashed; A.N.I.M.A.L. Random Revenge; Reencarnación	W.A.S.P. Accept; Cherry Bombs; Stratovarius; Perpetual Warfare; Arzen	Carnifex; Koyi K Utho; Aire Como Plomo; Poker; Gutgrinder

=== 2021 ===
==== Iowa ====
Saturday 25 September
Stage 1	Stage 2
Slipknot; Suicideboys; Gojira; Tech N9ne; Knocked Loose; Gatecreeper; Widow7	Megadeth; Lamb of God; Trivium; Fever 333; Turnstile; Vended

==== Knotfest Roadshow USA ====
Lineup

Slipknot
Killswitch Engage
Fever 333
Code Orange

==== Los Angeles ====
5 November

Slipknot
Bring Me the Horizon
Cherry Bombs
Killswitch Engage
Fever 333
Code Orange
Vended

=== 2022 ===
==== Knotfest Roadshow USA & Canada ====
Jinjer was announced to appear in the first leg, but cancelled due to the ongoing Russian invasion of Ukraine, their homeland.

March 16 - April 17	May 18 - June 18	September 20 - October 7
Slipknot; In This Moment; Wage War	Slipknot; Cypress Hill; Ho99o9	Slipknot; Ice Nine Kills; Crown the Empire

==== Germany ====
30 July

Slipknot
In Flames
Ghostemane
Meshuggah
Jinjer
Tesseract
Bleed from Within
Malevolence
Cattle Decapitation
Vended

==== Finland ====
Friday 12 August
Main Stage	Pulse of the Maggots Stage
Nightwish; Lamb of God; Arch Enemy; Stam1na; Timo Rautiainen & Trio Niskalaukaus	Huora; Lähiöbotox; Sara; Bloodred Hourglass

Saturday 13 August
Main Stage	Pulse of the Maggots Stage
Slipknot; Bring Me the Horizon; Cradle of Filth; Tesseract; Blind Channel	Huoratron; Moon Shot; Medeia; Stoned Statues; Shiraz Lane

==== Knotfest Roadshow Argentina ====
8 December	13 December	15 December
Movistar Arena		C Complejo Art Media
Slipknot; Arde La Sangre	Judas Priest; Horcas	Trivium.MAR

==== Colombia ====
9 December

Judas Priest
Pantera
Bring Me the Horizon
Venom
Trivium
Sepultura
Hypocrisy
Vended
Suicide Silence
Samael
Walls of Jericho
Acutor
Ceguera
Templa in Cinere
Ratos de Porão

==== Chile ====
11 December

Slipknot
Judas Priest
Pantera
Bring Me the Horizon
Mr. Bungle
Trivium
Sepultura
Vended
Rama (cancelled)
Weichafe (cancelled)
Tenemos Explosivos

==== Brazil ====
18 December
Knotstage	Carnival Stage
Slipknot; Bring Me the Horizon; Mr. Bungle; Motionless in White (cancelled); Vended; Project46; Black Pantera	Judas Priest; Pantera; Sepultura; Trivium; Oitão + Jimmy & Rats

=== 2023 ===
==== Australia ====
24 March - 26 March

Slipknot
Parkway Drive
Megadeth
Trivium
Northlane
Amon Amarth
In Flames
Knocked Loose
Spiritbox
Story of the Year
Alpha Wolf
Void of Vision
Bad Omens*
Malevolence

- Bad Omens pulled out of the Melbourne show on 24 March due to their vocalist Noah Sebastian losing his voice.

==== Japan ====
1 April	2 April
Slipknot; Trivium; Man with a Mission; In Flames; The Oral Cigarettes; Enter Shikari; Rottengraffty; Survive Said the Prophet; Red Orca; Crystal Lake; A Crowd of Rebellion; Band-Maid; CVLTE; THE冠; Asterism; Ailiph Doepa; Wagamama Rakia	Slipknot; Korn; Maximum the Hormone; Parkway Drive; Coldrain; Noisemaker; Fear, and Loathing in Las Vegas; Petit Brabancon; Paledusk; THE SIXTH LIE 魔法少女になり隊; PRAISE; HIKAGE

==== Italy ====
25 June

Slipknot
Architects
Amon Amarth
I Prevail
Lorna Shore
Nothing More
Bleed from Within
Destrage

=== 2024 ===
==== Australia ====
Knotfest Australia
21 March - 24 March
Stage 1	Stage 2
Pantera; Lamb of God; The Hu; Wage War; Escape the Fate; Speed; Brand of Sacrifice	Disturbed; Halestorm; Asking Alexandria; Thy Art Is Murder; Skindred; Windwaker; King Parrot

Knotfest Australia Sideshows
17 March	19 March		20 March			25 March		26 March	
Adelaide		Melbourne			Sydney		Brisbane		
Disturbed; Wage War	Pantera; King Parrot; Black Rheno	The Hu	Lamb of God; Brand of Sacrifice	Asking Alexandria; Wage War	Halestorm; Skindred; Reliqa	The Hu	Lamb of God; Brand of Sacrifice	Halestorm; Skindred; Reliqa	Asking Alexandria; Wage War

==== Iowa ====
21 September

Slipknot
Till Lindemann
Knocked Loose
Hatebreed
Poison the Well
Gwar
Vended
Dying Wish
Zulu
Twin Temple
Holy Wars
Swollen Teeth
Spine
Dose

==== Brazil ====
19 October	20 October
Slipknot; Mudvayne; Amon Amarth; Meshuggah; DragonForce; Orbit Culture; Ratos de Porão; Krisiun; Project46; Eminience; Kryour; Eskröta	Slipknot; Bad Omens; Till Lindemann; Babymetal; P.O.D. Poppy; Black Pantera; Ego Kill Talent; Seven Hours After Violet; Korzus; Papangu; The Mönic

==== Argentina ====
26 October

Slipknot
Amon Amarth
Meshuggah
Babymetal
Arde la Sangre
NVLO

==== Chile ====
2 November

Slipknot
Disturbed
Mudvayne
Amon Amarth
Babymetal
Poppy
Orbit Culture
Rama
Mawiza
SVVVNT
Nico Borie

=== 2025 ===
==== Australia ====
Stage 1	Stage 2
Slipknot; Babymetal; Slaughter to Prevail; Enter Shikari; In Hearts Wake; Miss May I Sunami	A Day to Remember; Polaris; Within Temptation; Hatebreed; Health; Vended; Drain

==== Mexico ====
6 December

Marilyn Manson
Falling In Reverse
Slaughter to Prevail
Shinedown
Wage War
Hanabie.
Fit For an Autopsy

=== PULSE OF THE MAGGOTS ===
Knotfest launched Pulse of the Maggots as an emerging artist series that has featured three digital festivals (2020, 2021 + 2022), one in-person festival (Birmingham 2022), and one showcase at South by Southwest in 2023. The Pulse of the Maggots brand also appears as naming on stages at full Knotfest festivals including Knotfest Finland 2022 and Knotfest Iowa 2024.

Pulse of the Maggots Festival 2020

NOV 13, 2020
Hacktivist

October Ends
PRXJEK
Cerberus
Orbit Culture
Tallah
dEMOTIONAL
Vended
SCARLET
Year of the Knife
Introtyl
Wargasm
Diamond Construct
VCTMS
Death Blooms
Death Tour
Thrown into Exile
Once Awake
156 Silence
I Revolt

Pulse of the Maggots Festival 2x21

June 25, 2021
Hyro the Hero

As Everything Unfolds
Lotus Eater
Gaerea
Baest
Elyne
Abbie Falls
Cult of Lilith
Capra
Earthists
Pupil Slicer
Superbloom
Druid

Pulse of the Maggots Festival 3x22

March 11, 2022
Shadow of Intent

Brutus
Creeping Death
Vexed
Enforced
Kid Bookie
Witch Fever
Bala
Dödsrit
Four Stoke Baron
Blanket
Wowod
Knoll
thoughtcrimes
Urne
Akiavel
Moon Unit
Dumah

Pulse of the Maggots Festival: Birmingham 4x22

August 10, 2022
Sylosis

Orbit Culture
Heriot
SpiritWorld
Rough Justice
All Hail The Yeti
Thrown Into Exile
Cauldron

Pulse of the Maggots Showcase: SXSW 5x23

March 18, 2023
The Callous Daoboys

Creeping Death
Escuela Grind
Miliatrie Gun
Soul Glo
VCTMS
