= Suicide King =

(The) Suicide King may refer to:

- King of hearts, a playing card sometimes called the "suicide king"
- Suicide King (album), a 2019 album by King 810
- The Suicide King (novel), by Robert Joseph Levy, based on the television series Buffy the Vampire Slayer
- "The Suicide King" (The Walking Dead), an episode of the television series The Walking Dead

== See also ==
- Suicide Kings, a 1997 crime thriller black comedy film
