= Memoirs of a Murderer =

Memoir(s) of a Murderer may refer to:

- Memoir of a Murderer (살인자의 기억법), novel by Kim Young-ha
- Memoir of a Murderer 2017 South Korean film based on the novel
- Memoirs of a Murderer (film), a 2017 Japanese remake of a 2012 Korean film Confession of Murder
- Memoirs of a Murderer (album), a 2014 album by King 810
