= War Outside =

War Outside may refer to:

- "War Outside", song from the King 810 album Memoirs of a Murderer
- "War Outside", song from the Kojey Radical album Reason to Smile
