= Latin rock =

Music subgenre

- Stylistic origins: Rock; Latin American music; Caribbean music; rock and roll; rhythm and blues; soul; funk
- Cultural origins: Late 1950s, Southern California, United States
- Derivative forms: Latin alternative

Local scenes
- Brazilian rock

Other topics
- Latin metal; List of artists

Latin rock is a term to describe a subgenre blending traditional sounds and elements of Latin American and Hispanic Caribbean folk with rock music. However, it is widely used in the English-language media to refer any kind of rock music featuring Spanish or Portuguese vocals. This has led to controversy about the scope of the terminology.

Latin rock should not be confused with "rock music from Latin America" or Rock en Español. It is also closely related to the Latin alternative scene (which combines Latin elements with alternative rock, pop, electronic music, indie or hip-hop among others) a term often used to refer the same phenomenon.

== History ==
=== Origins (1950s–1960s) ===
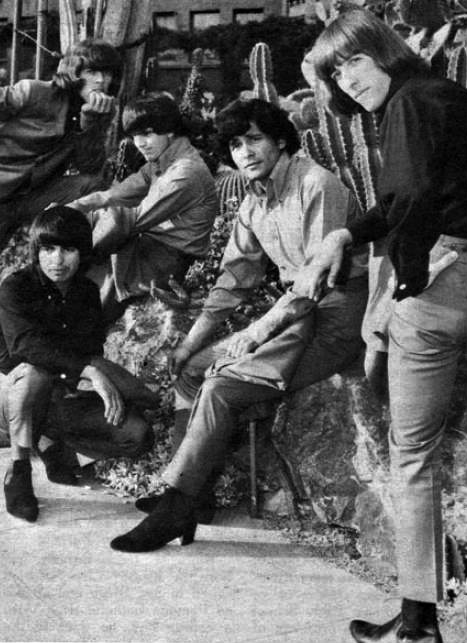
Sir Douglas Quintet were an American rock band that experimented with Latin folk elements during the 1960s.

Rock and roll music of the 1950s originated from a variety of sources including rhythm and blues, blues, gospel, country, bluegrass, western swing, and Tin Pan Alley pop music. Also, there was some influence of the traditional Latin music. Caribbean rhythms like calypso were used in surf music; and there were some rock and roll songs based on cha-cha-chá or mambo.

Latin rock was born in the United States during the late 1950s, though the term was not yet created. In 1958 an adaptation of a Mexican folk song called "La Bamba" was recorded by the Chicano rock artist Ritchie Valens. That same year, instrumental rock band the Champs released "Tequila", a song that incorporates clear Latin sounds and was composed by the band's chicano saxophonist Danny Flores).

During the 1960s, there were more examples of rock artists like Thee Midniters, Question Mark & the Mysterians, Sam the Sham and the Pharaohs or Sir Douglas Quintet that included Latin rhythms on their compositions. Also Chicano rock became popular in California; although not all of these can be considered early Latin rock artists since many of them lacked the Latin folk influences.

In some Latin American countries, Latin rock started to develop as well. In Peru, Colombia, Argentina, but specially Brazil where Tropicália appeared in the mid-1960s with the first releases of Os Mutantes, Gal Costa and Caetano Veloso from 1967 to 1970, a music movement that merged rock music with bossa nova, psychedelia and other Latin elements, and this can be regarded as the main root of the genre.

=== "Latin rock" term born (1970s) ===
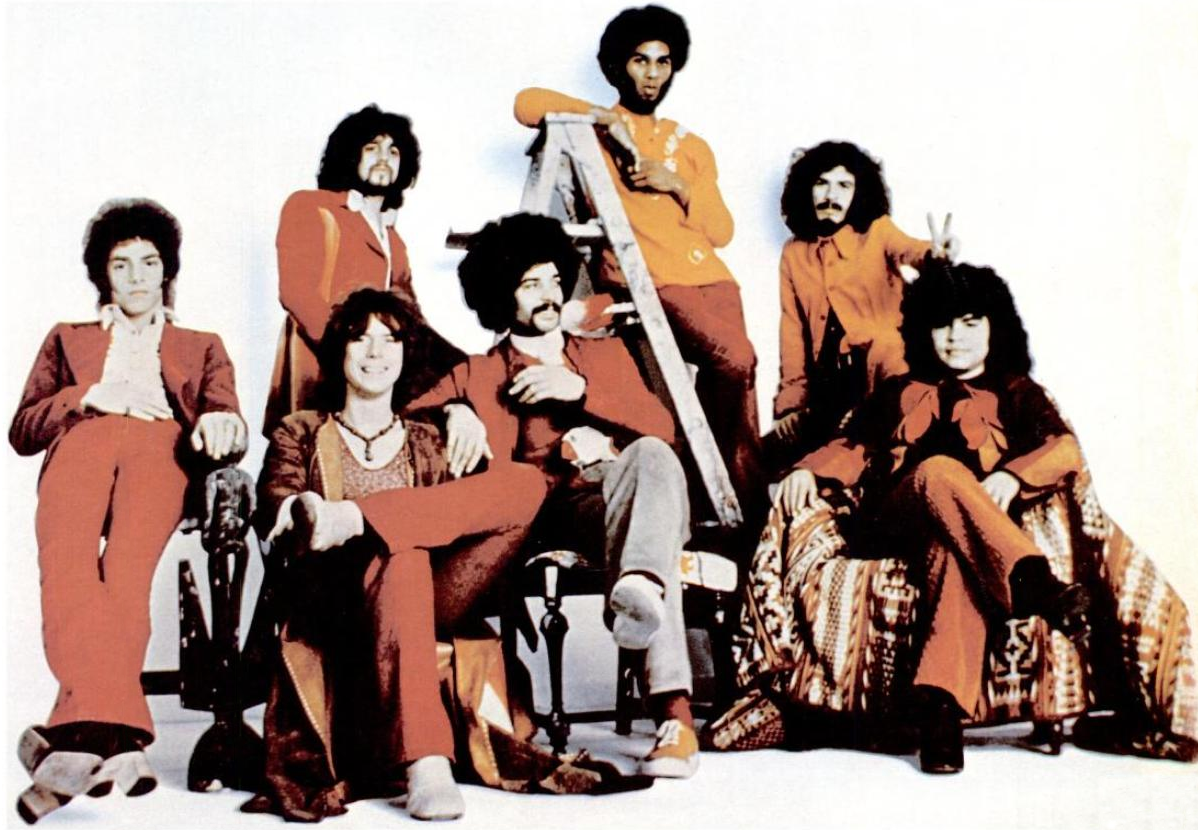
American band Santana in 1971

In 1969, after the release of the debut album by Santana, the term "Latin rock" appeared in the US and other parts of the world. It was an attempt to describe the band's music style as a fusion of Latin American and Caribbean rhythms, soul, jazz, funk, blues, psychedelia and rhythm and blues based on rock music.

Following Santana, other American bands appeared like Malo, Ocho, Mandrill, El Chicano, Eddie Palmieri's Harlem River Drive, War, Sapo and Azteca in the early 1970s popularizing the genre in the USA and the rest of the world.

The Latin American counterpart of Latin rock bands could be seen in Peru with bands like Telegraph Avenue, Traffic Sound, the Mad's, El Polen and specially Black Sugar melting rock with jazz music, Peruvian folk, progressive rock and Latin elements; in Colombia highlighted Siglo Cero, Génesis and La Columna de Fuego; in Argentina Arco Iris; and in Chile, Los Jaivas; in Brazil, artist such as Jorge Ben developed samba rock.

In the Philippines, the band Maria Cafra fused elements of blues, rock, Latin and kundiman to mold their distinct sound.

The genre arrived in Europe with the Spaniards Barrabás, Dutch Massada and African-British Osibisa.

Meanwhile, reggae music achieved a great success around the world. This rhythm originated in Jamaica during the 1960s, evolving from ska, rocksteady and bluebeat. Since its origins along with rock music and rhythm and blues with Jamaican folk rhythms, the Caribbean and Continental Latin America elements influenced the scene. Nevertheless, Reggae or Ska are not considered as part of the Latin Rock. On the other hand, disco also influenced Latin rock during the 1970s.

=== Latin rock evolution (1980–present) ===
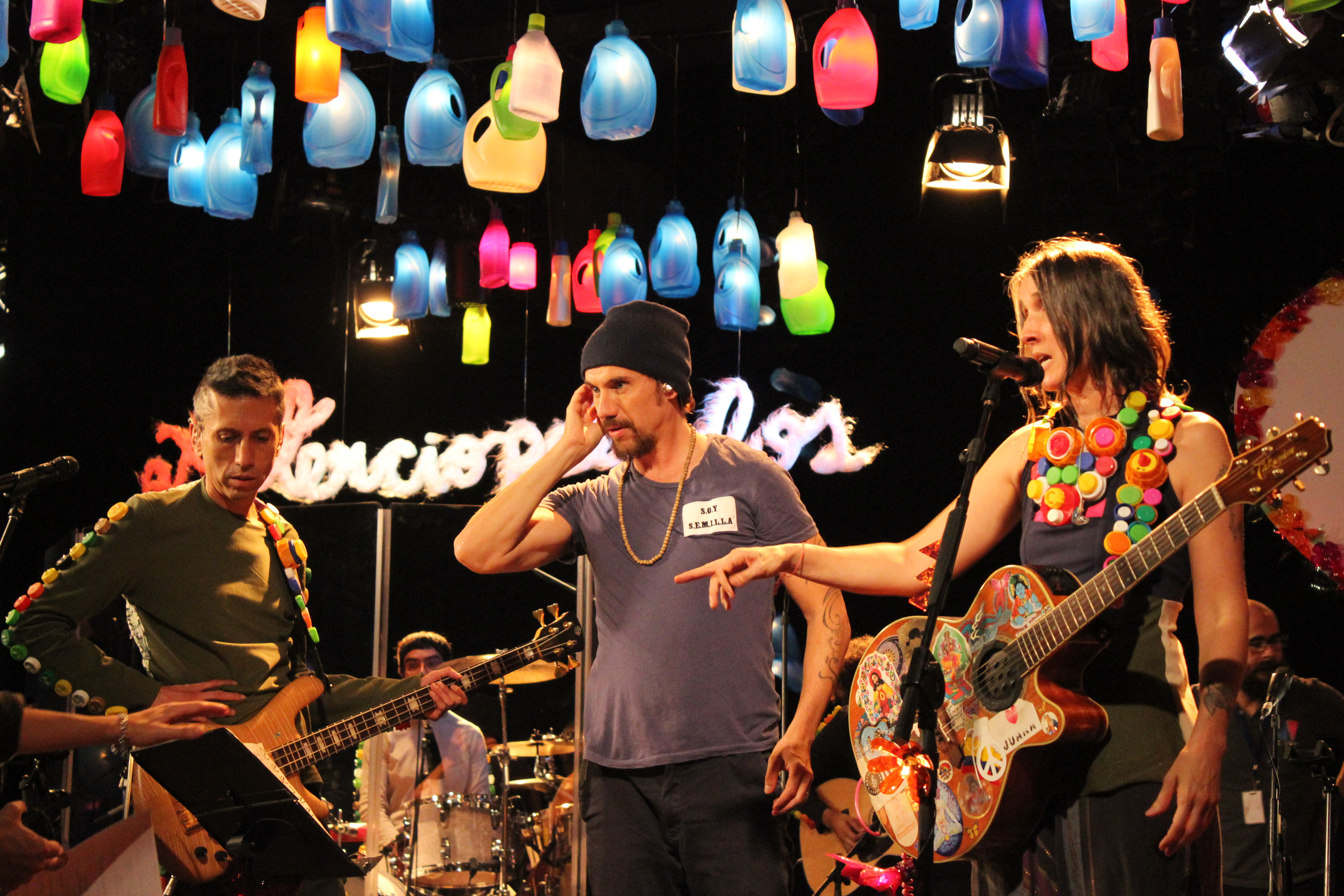
Colombian band Aterciopelados with the Spaniard Macaco.

After the birth of punk in late 1970s, the genre also was influenced by many other music styles. Some British punk and new wave acts like the Clash included elements that could be considered as "latin" in "Sandinista!" (1980). Other bands such as Bow Wow Wow, Haircut One Hundred, Kid Creole and the Coconuts, Modern Romance, Special AKA and Blue Rondo a la Turk did as well.

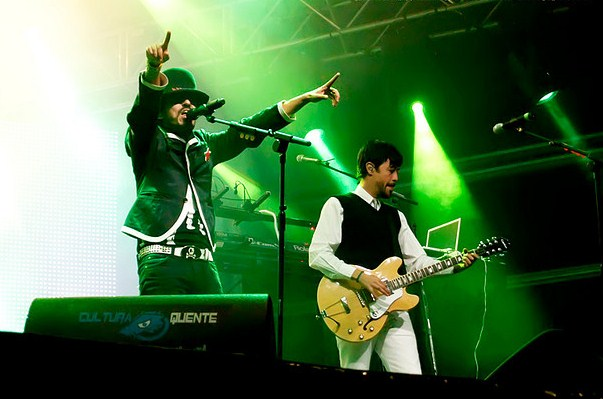
Mexican band Café Tacuba

In Spain, Los Coyotes, Los Mestizos and Radio Futura, that had emerged as new wave and post-punk acts, finally got influenced by Latin music at mid 1980s. Spain would go on to produce some Latin acts like Macaco, Amparanoia and Jarabe de Palo.

In France, bands like Les Negresses Vertes played a fusion of rock with World music including Latin elements. But Manu Chao was the major success of Latin rock in France with the band Mano Negra (also as a solo artist) with a style that would be known later as Latin alternative. A mix of rock, with Latin elements, Arabic music, punk, rap, flamenco, ska and reggae.

In the US during this period musicians like Los Lobos, El Vez, Sheila E., David Hidalgo, David Byrne (ex-leader of Talking Heads), and Cesar Rosas fused Latin music and rock music. David Byrne was interested in Brazilian music.

The genre consolidated during the 1990s in Latin America. Many bands appeared such as Rio Roma (Mexico), Maná (Mexico), Caifanes (Mexico), Café Tacuba (Mexico), Aterciopelados (Colombia), Paralamas do Sucesso (Brazil), Bersuit Vergarabat (Argentina), Karamelo Santo (Argentina), Maldita Vecindad (Mexico), Carmina Burana (Argentina), Los Fabulosos Cadillacs (Argentina), Soda Stereo (Argentina), Los Prisioneros (Chile), Los Tres (Chile), Octavia (Bolivia), Karnak (Brazil), Chancho en Piedra (Chile), Julieta Venegas (Mexico), Arena Hash (Peru) and Los Rabanes (Panama), that incorporated Latin folk rhythms on their compositions (especially Caifanes and Los Fabulosos Cadillacs). Ecuadorian rock incorporated recently indigenous musical influences.

== Controversy about the term ==
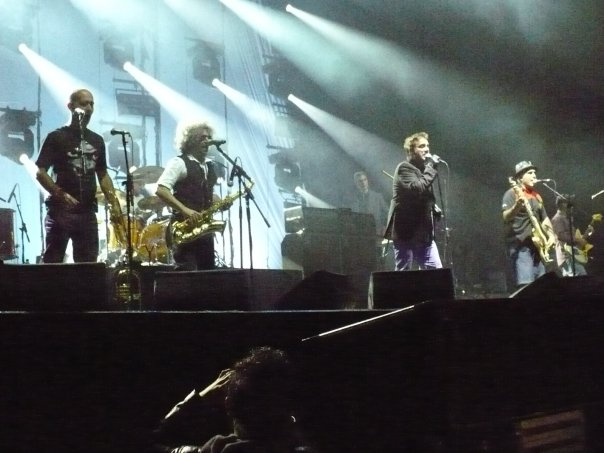
Argentine band Los Fabulosos Cadillacs

During the late 1990s, the rising population of "Latinos" in the US (term popularized since the 1960s due to the incorrect and confusing use of the term "Spanish" and the unpopular term "Hispanic") led the music industry to create the Latin Academy of Recording Arts & Sciences as a sub-department of National Academy of Recording Arts and Sciences. Also, in 2000 the Latin Grammy Awards were created. Thus, a great part of the English media started to refer to any kind of music featuring vocals in Spanish as "Latin music".

This term achieved a great success in some Latin American countries, where some of their regional press started to use the new terminology. This phenomenon spread the use of the "Latin rock" term with a quite different meaning from the original one. This led to controversy and confusion among many in the population.

== See also ==
- Latin alternative
- Latin metal
- Latin music (genre)
- Latin jazz
- Tropicália
- Samba rock
- Chicano rock
- Rock en español

== Bibliography ==
- Avant-Mier, Roberto (2010). Rock the Nation: Latin/o Identities and the Latin Rock Diaspora. United States: Continuum International Publishing Group. ISBN 978-1-4411-6448-3.
- Brill, Mark. Music of Latin America and the Caribbean, 2nd Edition, 2018. Taylor & Francis ISBN 1138053562
