= King 810 =

American nu metal band

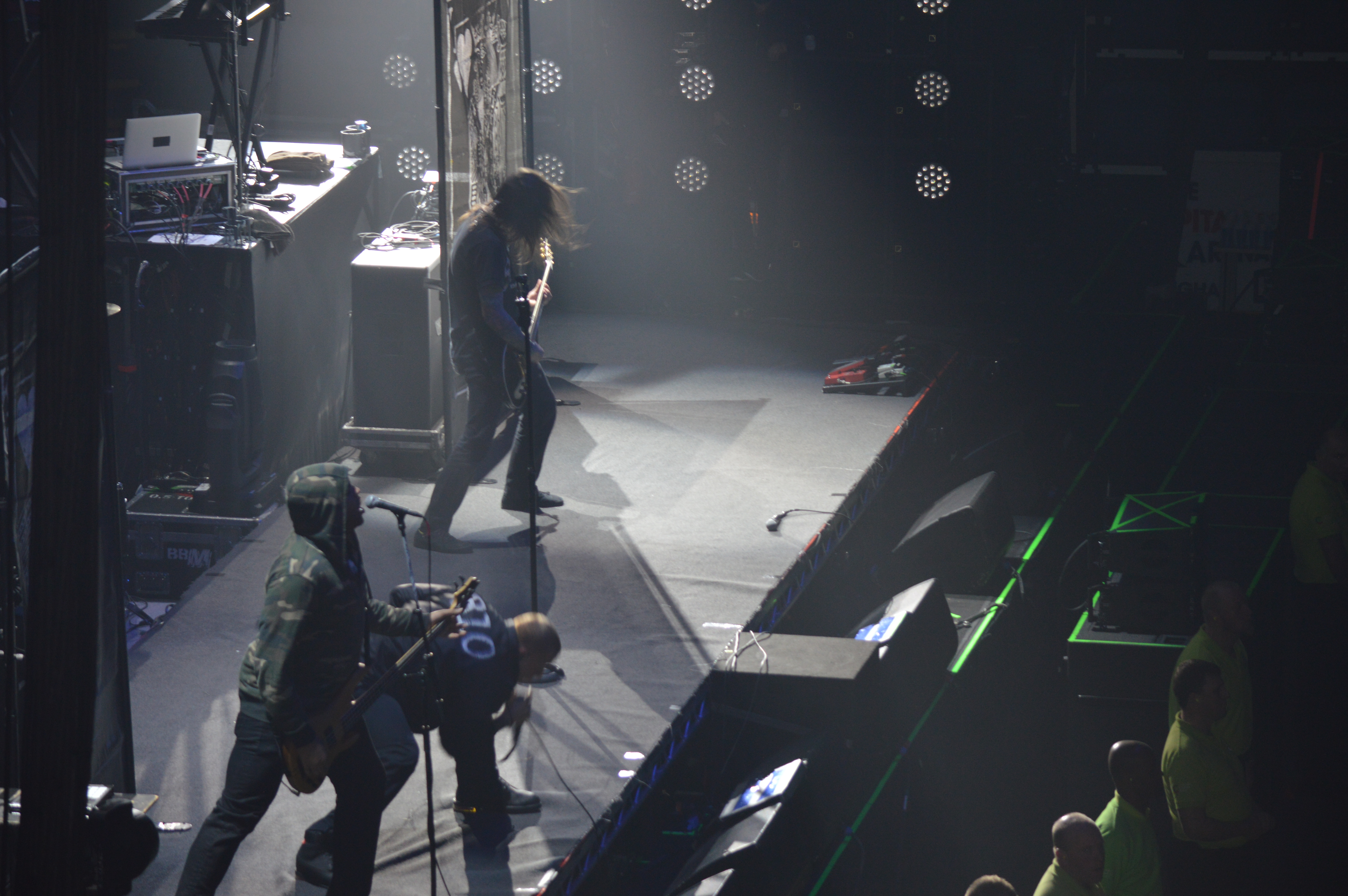
- King 810 performing in 2015

Background information
- Also known as: King
- Origin: Flint, Michigan, U.S.
- Genres: Nu metal; metalcore; rap metal; hard rock
- Years active: 2007–present
- Labels: Roadrunner; Equal Vision
- Members: David Gunn; Eugene Gill; John Paul Vega; Bryce Ballinger
- Past members: Jason Hale; Andrew Workman; Andrew Beal; Karl Hoffman; Hector Dominguez; Tim Lucier
- Website: king810.com

King 810 (pronounced King eight one oh; formerly known as and often shortened to simply King) is an American nu metal band from Flint, Michigan, formed in 2007. The band currently consists of David Gunn, Eugene Gill, Johnpaul Vega and Bryce Ballinger. The band's first release was their independent EP titled Midwest Monsters in 2012, which earned them a signing with Roadrunner Records; they released their second EP titled Proem in 2014, and their debut studio album Memoirs of a Murderer that same year.

== History ==
=== Formation and Midwest Monsters (2007–2012) ===
The band officially formed in December 2007 in their hometown of Flint, Michigan; however, the four members of the group had been performing together before then and had already gained a following. The lineup consisted of frontman and vocalist David Gunn, bassist Eugene Gill, drummer Andrew Workman and guitarist Andrew Beal. David Gunn revealed in a Metal Hammer documentary that he started writing lyrics for the band when he was arrested and eventually applied those lyrics to the band, which had already developed a sound he recognized, so he adapted said lyrics to that style.

In 2008, it was reported that the band had signed with Equal Vision Records, that Chiodos guitarist Jason Hale was a member of the band, making the band his side project, and that they intended to release a studio album in 2009. They toured together across America in December 2008. The band released demos on their Myspace, and it was reported that they had recorded an album with Mark Michalik at Detroit's 37 Studios. However, in August 2009, the band abruptly left the label without a stated reason, and with no album released. It is presumed that Jason Hale left the band around that time, since he is not mentioned in any of their later activities. The number '810', which is the area code for Flint, was used in the band name after they left Equal Vision.

In June 2012, Gunn was assaulted when he refused to hand over a bag during a robbery. He was shot and stabbed, but survived the attack and went on to write for the band's debut and independent EP, Midwest Monsters, which was heavily inspired by that particular event and previous experiences. The album was composed by Gunn and produced by Josh Wickman, and was only released physically. Digital copies would not become available until June 28, 2019.

=== Memoirs of a Murderer and Midwest Monsters 2 (2013–2015) ===
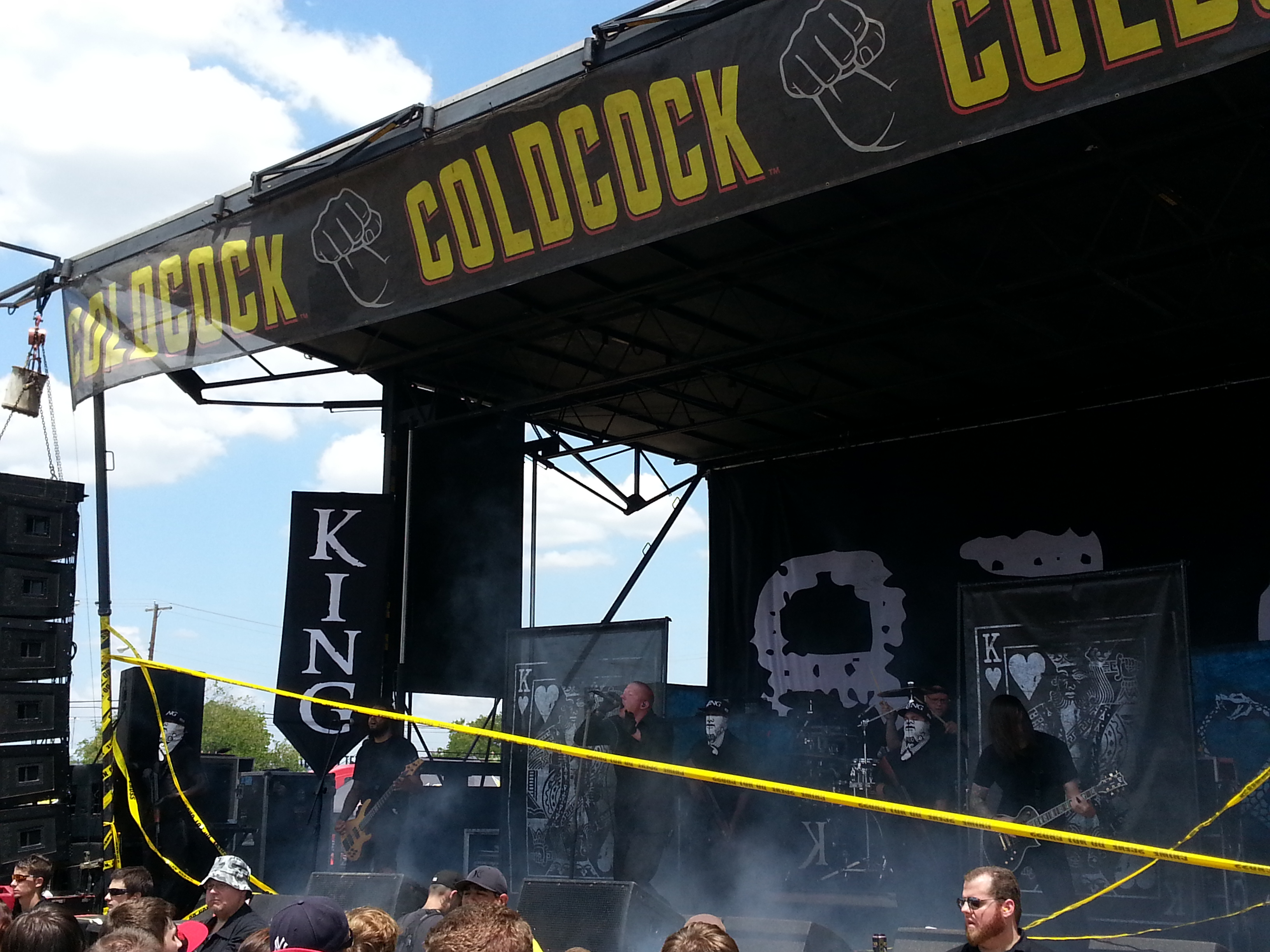
King 810 performing at Mayhem Festival 2014

They released the music video for their first single, "Killem All", on March 31, 2014, which contained graphic violence and real-life footage of people getting shot and killed. It was falsely removed from their YouTube page due to "hate speech". The music video was reinstated in 2018 and removed again in 2019. The song and graphic music video was used to promote their debut release via Roadrunner Records, Proem. In May, the band performed at Rock on the Range 2014 at Columbus Crew Stadium. The band released their second EP titled Proem on June 9 after streaming it online. They also joined the Mayhem Festival tour of 2014 from June to August with headliners Avenged Sevenfold and Korn.

The band initially intended to perform at Download Festival in June 2014, making this their debut UK performance, but had to cancel when members David Gunn and Eugene Gill were arrested in Detroit Metro Airport in June for assault with intent to do great bodily harm, in a case that dates back to October 2013. The charge against Gunn was later dropped, but Gill had to appear in court for assault with intent to do great bodily harm less than murder. In July, along with the release of their second single "Fat Around the Heart", which was promoted with a music video, they announced their debut studio album, which would be titled Memoirs of a Murderer and would be released on August 18 digitally and a day later physically. The album was their first to enter the charts; number 18 on Billboard's Top Hard Rock Albums and number eight on the Top Heatseekers.

The band finally made their debut UK performance in September to be a part of the 'Download Freezes Over' tour with support from 'Astroid Boys' and 'Hang the Bastard'. In late 2014, they toured in support of Slipknot along with Korn, playing U.S. shows including Knotfest. They continued this tour in early 2015 in the United Kingdom. In February, they released a spoken word track that comes as an ongoing series titled "Anatomy 1:5" that is not featured on any album but as a stand-alone promotional single. The band made their debut performance in Australia as a part of 2015's Soundwave in late February and early March. From April 8 to June 3, they will be supporting rapper Tech N9ne in promotion of his new album in Australia and New Zealand.

After touring, the band had plans to do a European festival tour in June, taking part in events such as Download Festival and Rock am Ring, however, had to cancel their participation due to unforeseen issues at their home town, but intend to create more music videos and other pieces of content during their break. The band took part in Dirt Fest in August in Michigan. On May 21, the band streamed a new song titled "Revenge", featuring hip-hop artist Trick-Trick, along with the release was the announcement of their mixtape titled Midwest Monsters 2. He released a statement regarding the next release that "Our next work features people we respect and are fans of. We're as proud of it as anything else we've done." They later released the mixtape on September 17 and features guest appearances from Freddie Gibbs, Zuse and Game Spittaz. A month later, in late October, they also released a limited 10" vinyl titled That Place Where Pain Lives... which features two previously unreleased songs from their debut album, a song named "Bad Man" and a string quartet version of "Devil Don't Cry", both feature UK singer RosieMay.

=== La Petite Mort or a Conversation with God (2016–2017) ===
In January 2016, the band released a song titled "We Gotta Help Ourselves" in aid to raise money and awareness of the toxic water crisis in their city of Flint, Michigan. Along with the release of the song, they teamed up with a local clothing outlet in Flint to create a unique T-shirt, of which all the proceeds go towards the Community Foundation of Greater Flint's Flint Child & Health and Development fund, Gunn himself commented that he believed "..children are the most important people in the equation."

In late July, the band released a music video for their single "I Ain't Goin Back Again", and revealed that their sophomore album will be titled La Petite Mort or a Conversation with God and will be released the same year, September 16. Other details regarding the album include its album artwork and its track list consisting of 13 songs.

Another track from the album, titled "Alpha & Omega", was released via the band's YouTube on August 24, 2016.

In 2017, Gunn had started a light heavyweight MMA career. He has won two matches, and last fought in January 2017.

On December 15, 2017, the band released an unexpected acoustic EP Queen, featuring five slow songs about five fast girls from Gunn's life. In late 2019, the band pulled the EP from streaming services with it only existing in cassette form on the band's website.

=== Suicide King, Yavid, and lineup change (2018–2019) ===
In the spring of 2018, the band opened up for Emmure on their Natural Born Killers tour, Counterparts and Varials joined up as support. King 810 was supposed to open up for Cane Hill, but they dropped off the tour. The band would later announce that Andrew Beal and Andrew Workman had quit the band.

While Gunn and Gene wrote a third king album, Gunn launched a solo rap project under the name Yavid, releasing his debut album Black Teeth Devil, Vol. 1 on July 13, 2018. Singles, such as "Bando Commando" and "Where Were You When We Would Ride", feature a huge change of style from previous King material with gangster rap and trap flows and beats. On September 7, 2018, he released the sequel Black Teeth Devil, Vol. 2.

King made their return on January 25, 2019, with Suicide King. It is the first record to be published and released independently after quietly and respectfully parting ways with Roadrunner Records in 2018. While opening the album with some of their heaviest tracks to date with singles "Heartbeats" and "Braveheart", the album is a drastic progression for the duo. The majority of tracks feature a similar rap/hip-hop style to Yavid with a wide variety of aggressive and melodic instrumentals. In addition, the cover art reflects the new colorful sound with the band's first ever non-black and white cover art. The album's lyrics, on the other hand, are bleak and nihilistic. In an interview, David says "around the time of the conception and making of Suicide King, [he] had been diagnosed with an identity disorder (DID)" or Dissociative Identity Disorder. In King TV Episode 19, Gunn confirms that the album's subject matter is not only suicide but also money. The album completes a trilogy of albums all dealing with love. Memoirs deals with the love of violence, La Petite Mort with the love of sex, and Suicide King with the love of money.

Gunn continued his Black Teeth Devil series shortly after on April 12, 2019, with the EP Vol. 3. Gunn released another full Yavid album, entitled Paper Fortune Teller on October 30, 2019. The music video for the single "Hemingway" showcases footage of David running with the bulls in Spain. This is also the first Yavid album to include features from rappers Rio Da Young OG and Paperlovee (notwithstanding the single version of "God's Don't Bleed" with Game Spittaz, who was also on King 810's Midwest Monsters 2 EP).

=== AK Concerto No. 47, 11th Movement in G Major and Rustbelt Nu Metal (2020–present) ===
The band kicked off the 2020s with the singles, "Hellhounds," on March 13, "Dukes," on May 1, and "House of Dust" on June 12 with a new album on the way. But before the fourth King album, Yavid dropped another BTD rap album, Black Teeth Devil, Vol 4, on April 16, featuring the single "The Noids." On July 31, 2020, New Album By Yavid 9 Muses.

On November 13, 2020, the band self released their fourth album, AK Concerto No. 47, 11th Movement in G Major.

On June 9, 2025, the band released their fifth studio album, Rustbelt Nu Metal, which was recorded in front of fifty people without the use of samples, keyboards, synths, or click tracks.

== Musical characteristics and lyrics ==
The band's lyrics are based on their lives growing up in the violent town of Flint. David Gunn himself was first arrested when he was nine years old, and states that in his area it was typical for kids at that age to commit crimes and use firearms. Kerrang! described Gunn's lyrical style as "heavy metal poetry" that, when performed live, has a theatrical vibe that would "leave venues full of grown men quivering in their boots." For this, they ranked the band number four of their 'Top 20 Hottest Bands in the World Right Now'.

Robb Flynn of heavy metal band Machine Head says King 810 has always fascinated him as they have more of a punk-rock side – they were often banned from clubs due to the chaos and violence they caused. Flynn says that they remind him of his early years in Machine Head, going on to say that lyrics are "killer" and that Gunn has a really intense vocal delivery. Artistdirect writer Rick Florino wrote that their distinct poly-rhythmic grooves and intricate riffs border on industrial sound, and that Gunn's lyrics channels the likes of Edgar Allan Poe, Ernest Hemingway and 2Pac, yet maintain a vulgar attitude; he concludes that their sound truly represents heavy metal music. Gunn himself says that he enjoys creating a diverse amount of musical content. In addition to the heavy and aggressive music the band is known for, he is also fond of calmer tracks such as "Take It", "State of Nature", and several other acoustic interludes that punctuate Memoirs of a Murderer. The band also perform poem-like spoken word tracks called "Anatomy" tracks.

One of the band's major influences is Korn, which is said to have had a particular impact on the musical style of their debut album, especially the darker sounds, lyrical style and guitar riffs. Their sound has also been compared to that of Slipknot and Bury Tomorrow.

After the release of their latest song "Revenge", Gunn released a statement suggesting that they will "...never make the same move twice and we're always creating."

=== Live performances ===
The band is known for its gritty stage presence and elaborate stage productions, with signature elements including Gunn performing covered in mud, hired men in masks wielding axes and baseball bats, and police security tape surrounding the stage to enhance the elements of crime and danger in their music. At times, they have been known to wield fake guns on stage. Some media outlets have criticized them as gimmicky and believe they are putting on an act, but Gunn rejects the idea that they are faking their stories. A December 2016 show in Chicago was canceled due to "excessive use of guns and violent imagery".

=== Fan base ===
The band's fan base pre-dates its official formation and current name. In their hometown of Flint, Michigan, their fans are known to be violent at their concerts, with one notable case occurring at a local music expo called 'Dirtfest' in 2009. Fans moshed violently, broke down fences, and fought back against police forces attempting to pacify them; some lit fireworks and aimed them into the crowd, and when the sound was ultimately cut off, fans continued singing their songs. Even before the band was signed, fans were observed with tattoos on their shins of the Flint area code (810) similar to those displayed by the band; some have gone as far as carving the band's logo into their skin.

== Controversy ==
King 810 members had various brushes with police. Other times, though avoiding official authorities, they have drawn ire from the music industry or border patrol.

On June 13, 2014, Gunn and Gill were arrested on charges of assault with intent to do great bodily harm less than murder stemming from a 2013 incident. As a result, King 810 canceled their commitment to perform at Download Festival. Upon further investigation, charges were dismissed.

Guitarist Andrew Beal was arrested on weapons possession charges on July 30, 2017, ahead of King 810's performance at Bloodstock.

On January 6, 2021, David Gunn was photographed on site at the storming of the United States Capitol. Gunn publicly responded on his Instagram confirming he attended, but did not participate in any crimes. Gunn disclosed in his post that he was contacted by the FBI regarding his attendance but there was no cause for charges, it was later revealed he was there shooting a music video.

== Side projects ==
=== Yavid (2018–present) ===
By March 2018, Gunn had released a number of hip-hop demos on SoundCloud under the moniker "Gunn". On June 7, 2018, Gunn debuted as Yavid, releasing the hip-hop single "Bando Commando". The track was produced by Jim Like, also known as @e4rth_beats. The pair continued their work; they have released six mixtapes and various singles.

==== Mixtape discography ====
- Yavid – Black Teeth Devil, Vol. 1 (2018)
- Yavid – Black Teeth Devil, Vol. 2 (2018)
- Yavid – Vol. 3 (2019)
- Yavid – Paper Fortune Teller (2019)
- Yavid – Black Teeth Devil, Vol. 4 (2020)
- Yavid – 9 Muses (2020)
- Yavid – Boogerman (2021)
- Yavid – Boogerman 2: Passin Out Smoke (2021)

== Band members ==
Current

- David "Gunn" Swan – lead vocals (2007–present)
- Eugene Gill – bass, backing vocals (2007–present), guitars (2017–2021), drums (2018–2021)
- John Paul Vega – drums (2019–present)
- Bryce Ballinger – guitars, keyboards (2024–present)

Former

- Jason Hale – guitars (2007–2010)
- Karl Hofftman – guitars (2011–2013)
- Andrew Beal – guitars (2007–2011,2013–2017)
- Andrew Workman – drums (2007–2018), piano (2014–2018)
- Tim Lucier – live guitars (2019)
- Hector Dominguez – American live guitars (2021–2022)
- Chris Reyes – American live guitars (2023–2024)
- Richard Shaw – European live guitars (2022, 2023)
- Dave Stewart – live guitars (2018–2025)

Timeline

== Discography ==
King 810 discography
- Studio albums: 4
- EPs: 3
- Singles: 2
- Music videos: 16
- Mixtapes: 1
- Promotional singles: 2
- LP's: 1

=== Studio albums ===
List of studio albums with details of each release and selected chart positions
Title	Album details	Peak chart positions			Sales
Title	Album details	US Hard Rock	US Heat.	US Rock	Sales
Memoirs of a Murderer	Released: August 18, 2014; Label: Roadrunner; Formats: CD, digital	18	8	—	US: 10,000+
La Petite Mort or a Conversation with God	Released: September 16, 2016; Label: Roadrunner; Formats: CD, digital	8	6	31	
Suicide King	Released: January 25, 2019; Label: Self-released	—	—	—	
AK Concerto No. 47, 11th Movement in G Major	Released: November 13, 2020; Label: Self-released	—	—	—	
Rustbelt Nu Metal	Released: June 9, 2025; Label: Self-released	—	—	—	
K7 Rustbelt Nu Metal 2	Released: October 31, 2025; Label: Self-released	—	—	—	
K8 Rustbelt Nu Metal 3	Released: March 20, 2026; Label: Self-released	—	—	—	
La Grande Mort or Silence of God	Released: November 27, 2026; Label: Self-released	—	—	—	

=== EPs ===
List of EPs with details regarding each release
Title	Album details
Midwest Monsters	Released: June 9, 2012; Digitally Released: June 28, 2019; Label: Independent release; Formats: CD, LP; LP Release: 8/10/2020: Purple vinyl, limited quantity produced
Proem	Released: May 13, 2014; Label: Roadrunner; Formats: Digital
Queen	Released: December 15, 2017; Label: Roadrunner; Formats: Cassette, CD
follow my tears	Released: January 23, 2023; Label: KING NATION; Formats: CD, LP, Digital
Under the Black Rainbow	Released: July 12, 2024; Label: KING NATION; Formats: CD, LP, Digital

=== LP ===
List of LPs with details regarding each release
Title	Album details
That Place Where Pain Lives	Released: October 30, 2015; Label: Roadrunner; Formats: LP, digital

=== Mixtapes ===
List of mixtapes with details regarding each release
Title	Album details
Midwest Monsters 2	Released: September 13, 2015; Label: datpiff; Formats: Digital

=== Singles ===
List of singles with year release and album origin
Title	Year	Album
"Killem All"	2014	Proem
"Fat Around the Heart"	2014	Memoirs of a Murderer
"eyes"	2015	Memoirs of a Murderer
"eyes (Eelrack Remix)"	2015	Non-album single
"I Ain't Goin Back Again"	2016	La Petite Mort or a Conversation with God
"Alpha & Omega"	2016	La Petite Mort or a Conversation with God
"Heartbeats"	2018	Suicide King
"Braveheart"	2018	Suicide King
"A Million Dollars"	2019	Suicide King
"Hellhounds"	2020	AK Concerto No. 47, 11th Movement in G Major
"Dukes"	2020	AK Concerto No. 47, 11th Movement in G Major
"House of Dust"	2020	AK Concerto No. 47, 11th Movement in G Major
"Red Queen"	2020	AK Concerto No. 47, 11th Movement in G Major
"Glow"	2024	Under the Black Rainbow
"Hurry Hurry Ahura Mazda"	2024	Under the Black Rainbow
"Rustbelt Numetal"	2025	Rustbelt Numetal
"Noonday Demon"	2025	Rustbelt Numetal
"Generation Pain"	2025	Non-album single
"Blood Rum & Rhythm"	2025	K7 Rustbelt Numetal 2
"Silence After a Shootout"	2025	K7 Rustbelt Numetal 2
"I Dont Mind"	2025	K7 Rustbelt Numetal 2
"Black Doves"	2025	K7 Rustbelt Numetal 2
"The lotus ruin bloomed"	2025	K7 Rustbelt Numetal 2
"Boo!"	2025	K7 Rustbelt Numetal 2
"Hungry Gods"	2026	La Grande Mort or Silence of God
"Love Kills"	2026	La Grande Mort or Silence of God

=== Promotional singles ===
List of promotional singles
Title	Year	Album
"Anatomy 1:5"	2015	Non-album single
"We Gotta Help Ourselves"	2016	Non-album single
"crow's feet"	2016	Not Safe To Drink: Music For Flint Water Crisis Relief
"Brahma (2010)"	2016	Non-album single

=== Music videos ===
List of music videos with year of release, album origin and director
Title	Year	Album	Director
"Killem All"	2014	Proem	Unknown
"Fat Around the Heart"	2014	Memoirs of a Murderer	John 'Quig' Quigley
"War Outside"	2014	Memoirs of a Murderer	Unknown
"State of Nature"	2014	Memoirs of a Murderer	Unknown
"Murder Murder Murder"	2014	Memoirs of a Murderer	Unknown
"Desperate Lovers"	2014	Memoirs of a Murderer	David Gunn
"Eyes (Sleep It All Away)"	2015	Memoirs of a Murderer	John 'Quig' Quigley
"Vendettas (featuring Zuse)"	2015	Midwest Monsters 2	Unknown
"Devil Don't Cry"	2015	Memoirs of a Murderer	DK Gunn
"Carve My Name"	2016	Memoirs of a Murderer	Katia Spivakova
"I Ain't Goin Back Again"	2016	La Petite Mort or a Conversation with God	DK Gunn
"Alpha & Omega"	2016	La Petite Mort or a Conversation with God	DK Gunn
"La Petite Mort"	2017	La Petite Mort or a Conversation with God	DK Gunn
"Heartbeats"	2019	Suicide King	DK Gunn
"Braveheart"	2019	Suicide King	DK Gunn
"Hellhounds"	2020	AK Concerto No. 47, 11th Movement in G Major	DK Gunn
"Dukes"	2020	AK Concerto No. 47, 11th Movement in G Major	DK Gunn
"House of Dust"	2020	AK Concerto No. 47, 11th Movement in G Major	DK Gunn
"Red Queen"	2020	AK Concerto No. 47, 11th Movement in G Major	DK Gunn
"I am the Enemy"	2021	AK Concerto No. 47, 11th Movement in G Major	DK Gunn

== Accolades ==
Year	Nominee / work	Award	Result	Ref.
2015	King 810	Golden Gods Award for Best New Band	Nominated	
2017	La Petite Mort or a Conversation with God	Detroit Music Award for Outstanding National Major Label Recording	Nominated	
