= La Petite Mort or a Conversation with God =

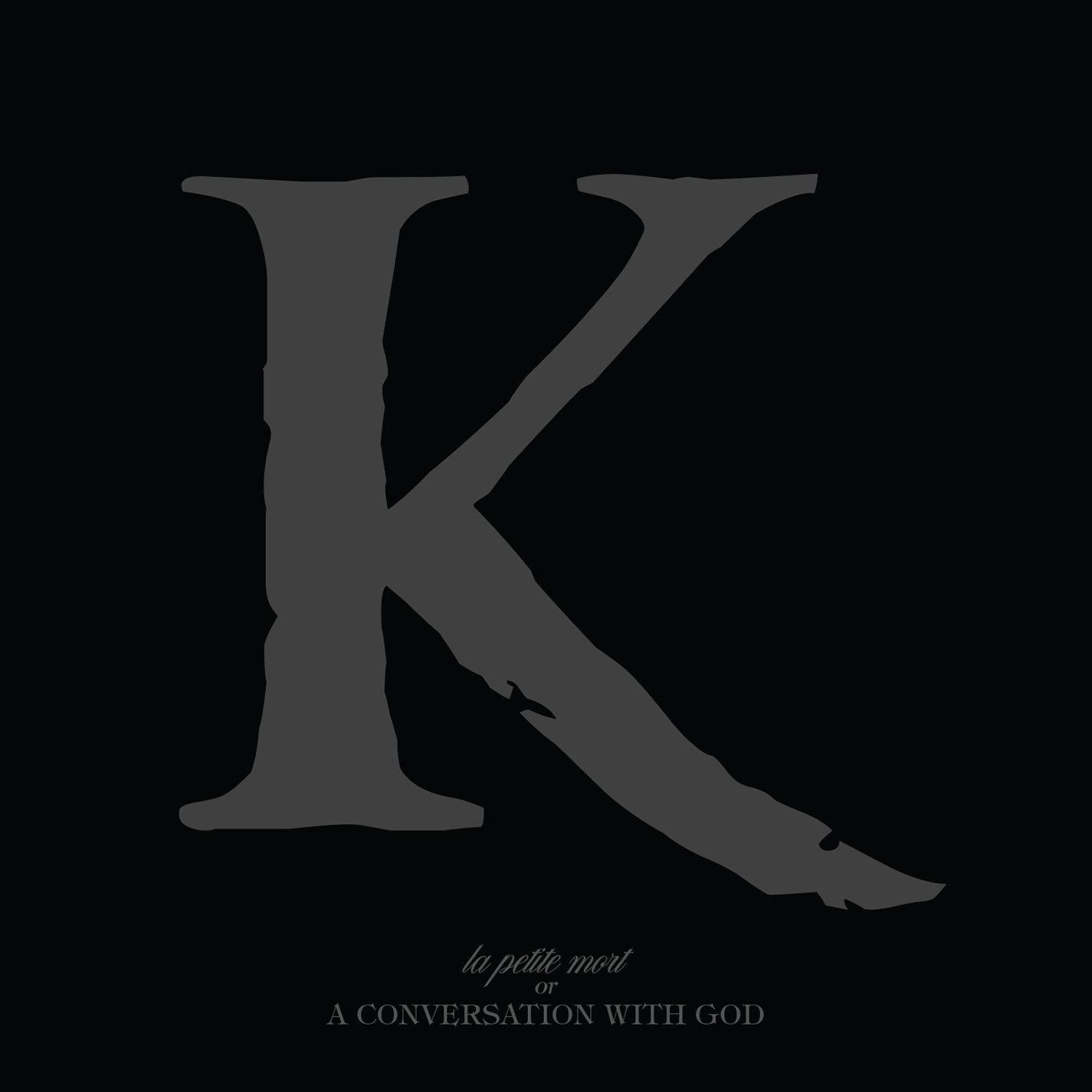

Studio album by King 810
- Released: September 16, 2016
- Recorded: 2016
- Studios: Josh Schroeder, Bay City, Michigan
- Genres: Nu metal, metalcore
- Length: 61:30
- Label: Roadrunner
- Producers: Josh Schroeder; Justyn Pilbrow; King 810

King 810 chronology
Memoirs of a Murderer (2014)	La Petite Mort or a Conversation with God (2016)	Suicide King (2019)

Singles from La Petite Mort or a Conversation with God
- 1. "I Ain't Goin Back Again" Released: July 25, 2016; 2. "Alpha & Omega" Released: August 24, 2016

Professional ratings
Review scores
Source	Rating
Metal Injection	9/10
MetalSucks	4/5 stars
New Noise	4.5/5 stars
Sputnikmusic	2/5

La Petite Mort or a Conversation with God is the second studio album by American heavy metal band King 810. It was released on September 16, 2016, via Roadrunner Records.

== Track listing ==
All tracks are written by King 810.

No.	Title	Length
1.	"Heavy Lies the Crown"	2:19
2.	"Alpha & Omega"	3:39
3.	"Give My People Back"	4:39
4.	"Vendettas"	3:03
5.	"Black Swan"	4:11
6.	"The Trauma Model"	4:03
7.	"La Petite Mort"	7:59
8.	"I Ain't Goin Back Again"	5:17
9.	"War Time" (featuring Trick-Trick)	4:09
10.	"Life's Not Enough"	6:28
11.	"Me & Maxine"	4:42
12.	"Wolves Run Together"	6:35
13.	"A Conversation with God"	4:33
Total length:		61:30

== Personnel ==
King 810

- David Gunn – vocals
- Andrew Beal – guitars
- Eugene Gill – bass
- Andrew Workman – drums

Additional musicians

- Christian Mathis – vocals (track 9)
- Reba Meyers – vocals (track 9, 10)
- Joseph Bongiorno – string arrangements, orchestration (track 4)
- Sammy "Bananas" Posner – alto saxophone (track 10)
- JC Kuhl – tenor saxophone (track 10)
- Kaylee Oczpek – vocals (track 10)
- Delphine Montassier – vocals (track 7, 13)

Production

- King 810, Josh Schroeder – production, mixing
- David Gunn – lyrics
- Justyn Pilbrow – production (track 6, 10, 12)
- Dave Kutch – mastering

== Chart history ==
Chart (2016)	Peak position
US Top Rock Albums (Billboard)	31
US Top Hard Rock Albums (Billboard)	8
US Heatseekers Albums (Billboard)	6
