= Vended =

American nu metal band

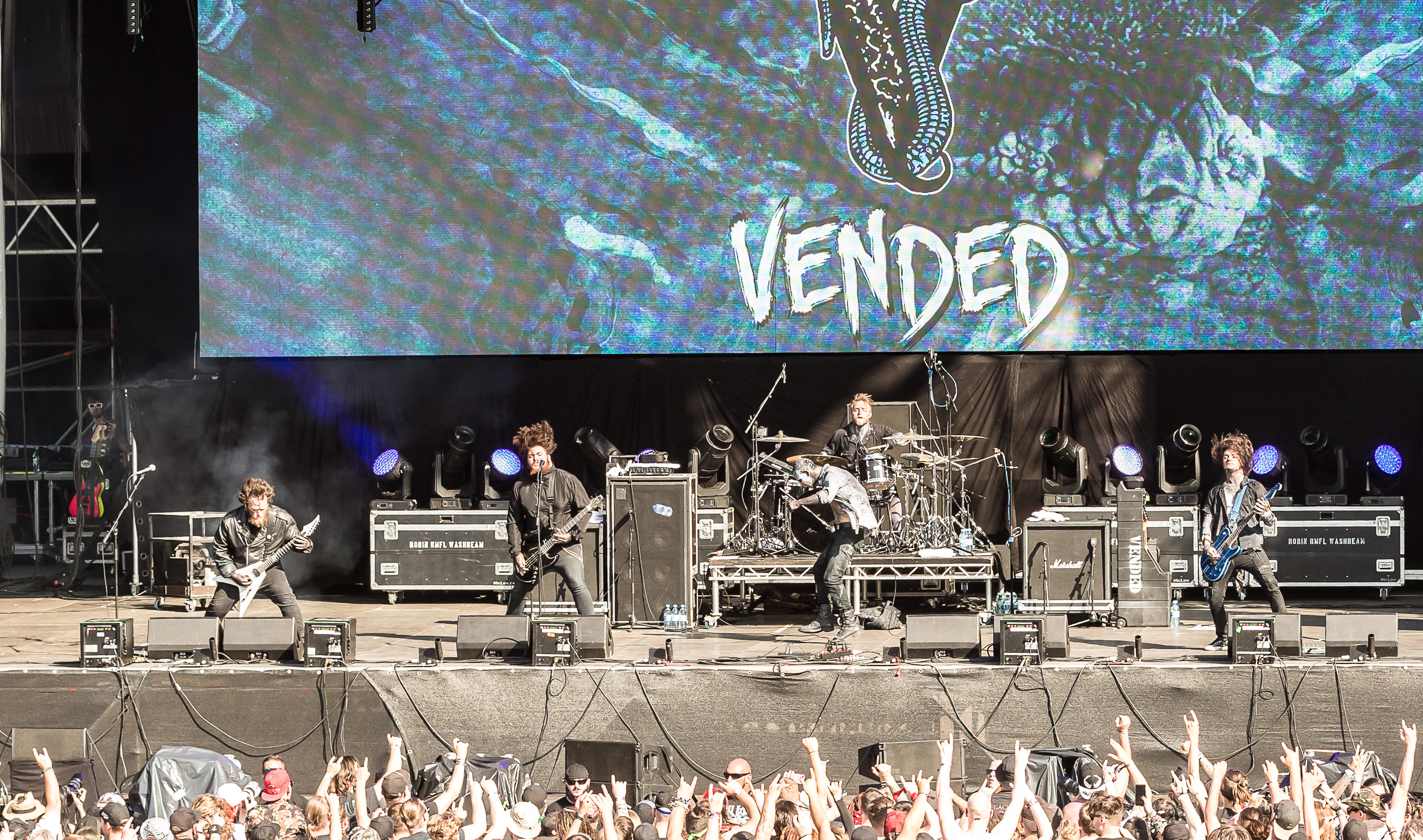
- Vended performing in Ferropolis, Germany, 2023

Background information
- Origin: Des Moines, Iowa, U.S.
- Genres: Nu metal; metalcore
- Years active: 2018–present
- Members: Griffin Taylor; Simon Crahan; Jeremiah Pugh; Jayden Scovel; Cole Espeland
- Past members: Connor Grodzicki

Vended is an American heavy metal band from Des Moines, Iowa, founded in 2018. The band features two members who are sons of members of Slipknot: singer Griffin Taylor is the son of Corey Taylor, and drummer Simon Crahan is the son of Shawn "Clown" Crahan. Their debut self-titled album was released in September 2024.

== History ==
Vended was formed in 2018 by Griffin Taylor and Simon Crahan when they were teenagers; the duo then recruited bassist Jeremiah Pugh and guitarists Cole Espeland and Connor Grodzicki. Their name is pronounced with emphasis on the second syllable: "ven-DEAD", and is based on the word vendetta. The band avoided touring during their first few years due to their young age.

The younger Taylor and Crahan resist comparisons of the band to Slipknot, maintaining that they are largely self-taught musicians and did not receive extensive instructions from their fathers. This assertion has been supported by the elder Taylor and Crahan.

Their first live performance was in Des Moines in March 2020, just before being forced to go on hiatus by the COVID-19 pandemic. They released their first recording, the single "Asylum", in September 2021. Vended released their second single, "Burn My Misery", in October. The five-song EP What Is It//Kill It was released in November 2021.

In late 2022, Vended toured the United States with Jinjer and P.O.D. The band also released several stand-alone singles starting in 2022. Their first full-length album, Vended, was released in September 2024. Grodzicki left the band for personal reasons in September 2025. Following Grodzicki's departure, Jayden Scovel joined Vended on rhythm guitar. By October 2025, Scovel was performing with the band during tour with Mudvayne and Static-X.

== Band members ==
Current

- Griffin Taylor – lead vocals
- Cole Espeland – lead guitar
- Jayden Scovel – rhythm guitar
- Jeremiah Pugh – bass, backing vocals
- Simon Crahan – drums

Former

- Connor Grodzicki – rhythm guitar, backing vocals

== Discography ==
=== Studio albums ===
- Vended (2024)

=== EPs ===
- What Is It//Kill It (2021)

=== Singles ===
Year	Song	Album
2021	"Asylum"	What Is It/Kill It
2021	"Burn My Misery"	What Is It/Kill It
2022	"Ded to Me"	non-album single
2022	"Overall"	non-album single
2023	"Am I the Only One"	Vended
2024	"The Far Side"	Vended
2024	"Nihilism"	Vended
2024	"Serenity"	Vended
