= Here Comes the Kraken =

Mexican deathcore band

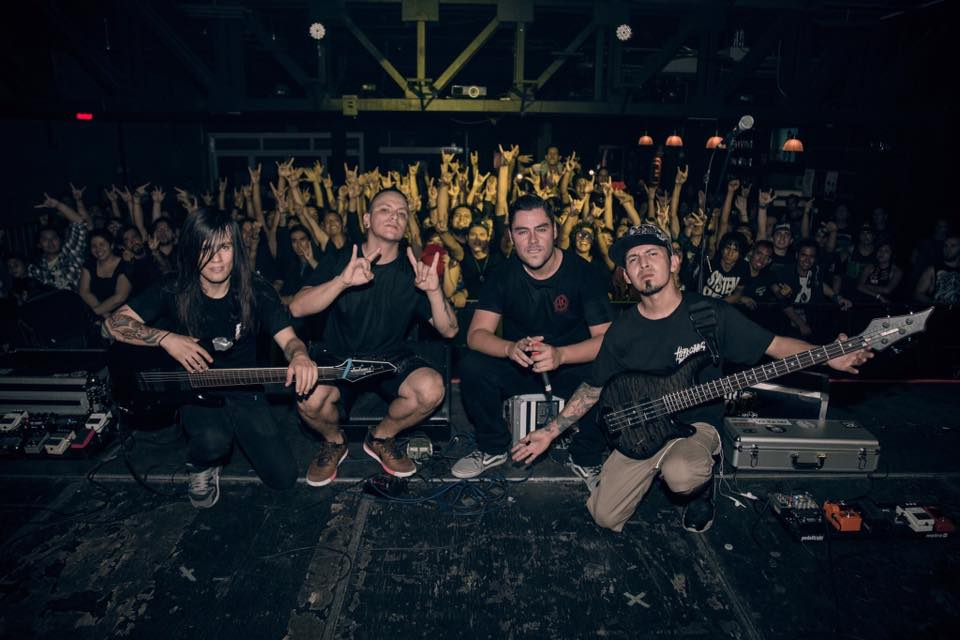
- Here Comes the Kraken in 2016

Background information
- Origin: Aguascalientes, Mexico
- Genres: Deathcore, melodic death metal, metalcore, nu metalcore
- Years active: 2007–present
- Label: 666MX
- Members: Tore González; Deivis González; José "TTS" Manuel; Freddy Sánchez
- Website: herecomesthekraken.com

Here Comes the Kraken is a Mexican deathcore band from Aguascalientes, formed in 2007. They have released three studio albums, two extended plays and one demo.

== History ==
The band was formed in 2007 by brothers Tore González (lead guitar) and Deivis González (drums). They later recruited José "TTS" Manuel on vocals, Freddy on bass and Alex Guardado on rhythm guitar. Their debut eponymous album (Here Comes The Kraken) was released in 2008, which was accompanied with an extensive tour in Mexico and Europe. They then followed this up with an EP entitled The Omen in 2010. Both of these releases shared a similar, very heavy death metal influenced sound.

In May 2010, they won at the Indie-O Music Award for "Metal Band of the Year".

== Musical style ==
The band's musical style agarres as an extreme metal genre known as deathcore, mixing death metal and metalcore. Since their 2011 sophomore album Hate, Greed and Death, they have inducted nu metal influences into their music.

== Members ==
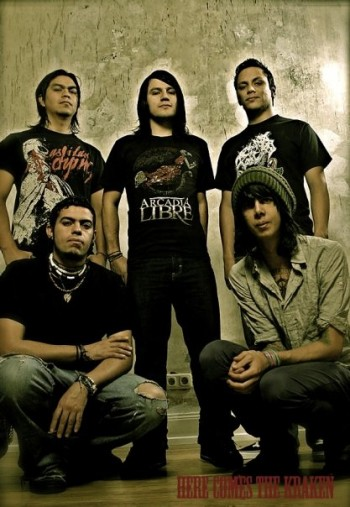
The band in 2008

=== Current members ===
- Tore González – guitars (2007–present)
- David "Deivis" González – drums (2007–present)
- José "TTS" Manuel – vocals (2007–2009, 2010–2011, 2012–2014, 2016–present)
- Federico "Freddy" Sánchez – bass (2007–2009, 2019–present)
- Fer Castro - guitar (2024-present)

=== Past members ===
- Bnj Martínez – vocals (2015–2016)
- Alexandro "Alexa" Hernández- bass (2009–2016), vocals (2014–2015)
- Daniel Weber – vocals (2011)
- Jero – keyboards, turntables (2009–2011)
- Gelar Haro – vocals (2009–2011)
- José Macario – bass (2018) (Arcadia Libre, Parazit, José Macario Trio, Ladrones)
- José Paredes – clean vocals, keyboards (2010–2011)
- Alex Guardado – rhythm guitar (2007–2016)

== Discography ==
Studio albums

- Here Comes the Kraken (2008, 666mx/Concreto Records)
- Hate, Greed and Death (2011, Sony Music/666mx)
- H.C.T.K (2019, 666mx/Moon Records)

EPs

- Demo (2007, 666mx/self-released)
- The Omen (2009, 666mx/Concreto Records)
