= The ReAktion =

Chilean rock band

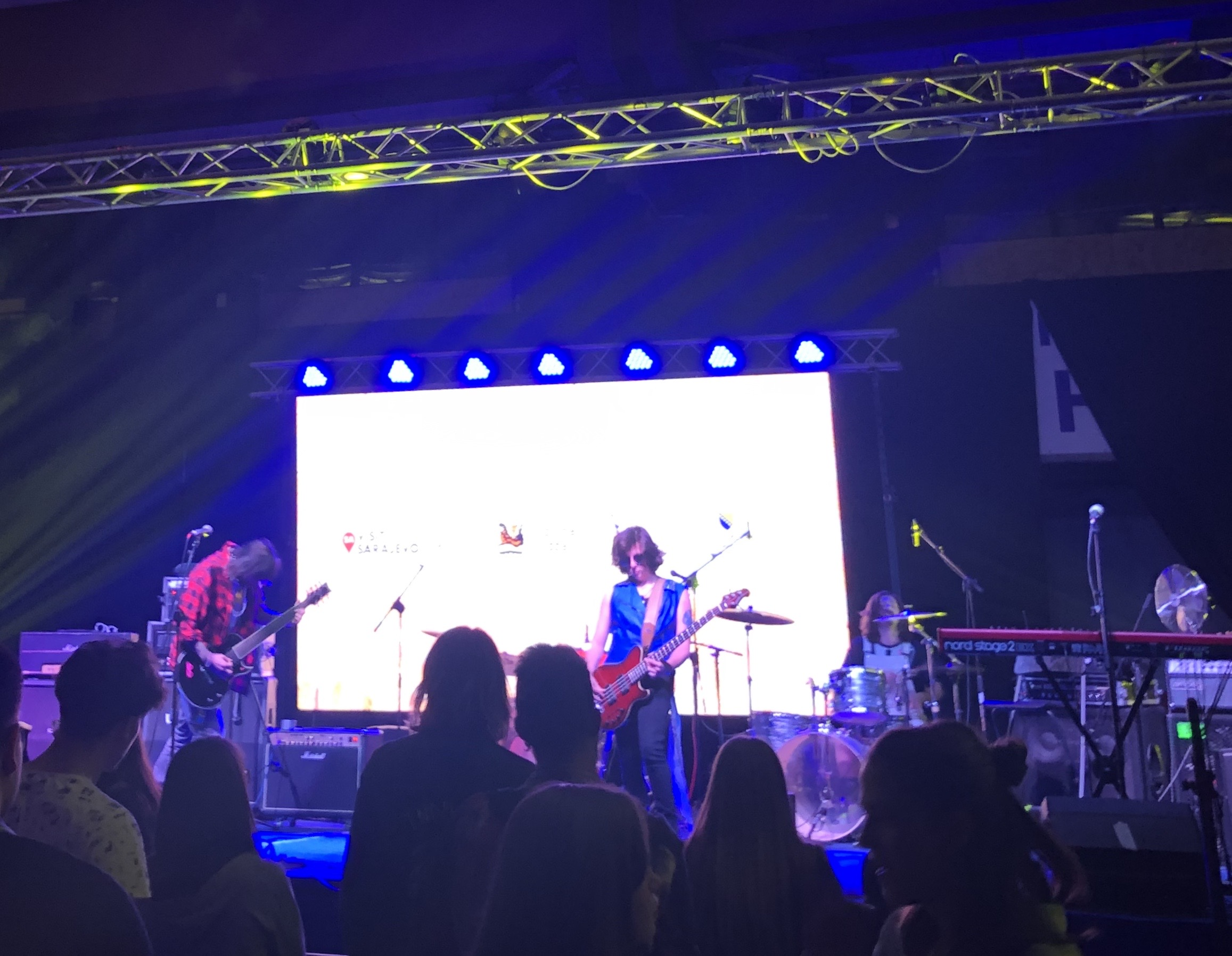
- The ReAktion performing in September 2019. From left to right: Simon Rojas, Esteban Domić and Virgo Domić.

Background information
- Also known as: ReAktion, The Re∆ktion
- Origin: Santiago, Chile; Los Angeles, California, US
- Genres: Alternative rock; nu metal
- Years active: 2010–present
- Labels: Mainia Recordings; RockZone Records
- Members: Simon "Nowis" Rojas Hoces; Esteban Domić; Ernesto "Virgo" Domić

The ReAktion is a Chilean Croatian alternative rock band from Santiago founded in 2010. The band's current lineup comprises founder member Simon Rojas Hoces together with brothers Ernesto "Virgo" Domić and Esteban Domić. The band is known for dealing with subjects such as social conscience, environmentalism. Their sound has been described as a high energy wall of sound, backed by steady drum beats and atmospheric vocals. Their skeptical message is what defines their lyrical and musical content.

They released three studio albums. Their debut album Selknam was produced by Garth Richardson in The Farm Studios in Vancouver, Canada released in 2015. Their second album Similitude came out worldwide during 2017, both albums released by the record label Mainia Recordings in Los Angeles, California. What a Day is their third studio album which exposes critically the migrant crisis, 2019–20 Chilean protests. Under the watchful eye of Europeans, the current trio enjoys well-deserved media attention after ten years of musical journey, a persistence that has fueled the daily lives of the band in the old continent considered as key social whistleblowers among the community. Their first EP BeLIEve in rEVOlution was released in 2011, the band has recorded eight official videoclips.

They have expanded their career throughout North America and South America, touring and performing in Knotfest, Texas Showdown, Kushstock Festival and other major shows under Sid Wilson's management with press exposure in Rolling Stone, Revolver, Loudwire. The band has performed in humanitarian causes and main venues across Europe in countries such as; Germany, the United Kingdom and vastly across Eastern Europe.

== History ==
=== Foundation and BeLIEve in rEVOlution (2010–2012) ===
The feeling of having a rock band came from Simon "Nowis" Rojas Hoces and Leonardo Signorelli. They were schoolmate during 97' in Santiago, Chile and became close friends listening intensely to rock music such as; Slipknot, Meshuggah, Alice in Chains, Nirvana and more harmonic rock; The Beatles, Radiohead, Smashing Pumpkins, looking a way to put their musical influences, lifestyle and career together.

After playing in different rock bands they came up with The Reaction together with Phillip Monypenny in bass and Diego Sagredo in vocals, guitars and synths, they both came with musical influences based on Rammstein, Nine Inch Nails, Marilyn Manson, Atari Teenage Riot and industrial metal in general. At that time Alvaro Monzón and Patricio Gónzales joined the band, playing the band's first performances, but soon departure the musical project during that same year.

During the summer of 2010 the band recorded their first EP BeLIEve in rEVOLution with 14 full-length songs and 2 hidden tracks in Backstage Rockstore. Rojas Hoces spent four months intensively learning to produce, mix and master to achieve the sound the band wanted to deliver at the time. In the beginning of their career they did shows around bars and clubs in the city and one local tour. Then during 2011 they decided to go to Vancouver, Canada to release their new EP internationally and get to sign with a record label.

=== Selknam (2012–2015) ===
The band did shows in Canada for three months until they met their first producer Garth Richardson in 2012 when the band was beginning to write Selknam, their first official album and changing their name from The Reaction to The ReAktion by a suggestion of the co-producer Garth Futcher during a concert in the punk venue Funky Winker Beans due to the controversial message of the band regarding their approach to consciousness. It took them almost a year to record Selknam, for it to be released afterwards in the beginning of 2015. In this period Felipe "Ikaro" Alvaréz joined as a tour member playing synth and backing vocals. After all this process, the band signed with the promoting agency Mach2point8ent and their first manager Sid Wilson from the world known alternative metal band Slipknot. This was the beginning of The Reaktion´s U.S career. They did their first tour Art of Fury with the nu-metal band Otep which covered more than 60 cities in the US during 2015. The last show of this tour was in the famous Roxy Theatre (West Hollywood). That day the band signed with their first record label Mainia Recordings, in Los Angeles, California.

After that tour, they had a recess and reconsidered their personal lives and thoughts. This led to Monypenny's departure of the band and after a couple of months Signorelli and Sagredo's departure by their own consent.

Rojas Hoces and Felipe Alvaréz continued the band and Garrett Wolf joined playing bass, whom they have met in Canada. The band grew and got involved with bands like Hollywood Undead, Tantric and performing in festivals such as; Knotfest California and Kushtock Festival in Downtown Los Angeles. The band continued touring North America, their concerts covered four times the U.S. territory, this to promote Selknam which also included performances in South America. After several shows during 2015 and 2016, the band was crossing El Paso, Texas going to a festival to perform but the band got in legal troubles.

The band was forced to stop spending two months held. This became a creative process and the starting point of their new album Similitude where songs and lyrics were made. Inspired by horror, depression and the chihuahuan desert. The scenario created a completely new beginning for the band, Garrett Wolf and Felipe "Ikaro" Alvaréz reconsidered their lives and progressively departure the band. During this time Rojas Hoces became the only member of the band.

=== Similitude (2016–2019) ===
From 2016 until 2017 The Reaktion made their second album Similitude in Invitro Studios Santiago de Chile which was written and produced by Rojas Hoces. From this period onwards the Domić brothers Esteban and Virgo joined. They recorded most of the album's music after what Rojas Hoces had already done together with former members Moneypenny and Alvarez's collaboration.

The album was successfully released on October 27, 2017, where it had again very good reception on the U.S press and very positive reviews regarding the originality of their music. On the local scene the band performed several shows, and toured extensively the South of Chile.

Together with their record label Mainia Recordings and The Revels group, the band started to plan their return to the U.S to continue performing, which led to a bureaucratic struggle regarding the musicians visas. This led the band to develop its career in Europe, which the Domić brothers had previously made career with alternative rock band Scomic since 2012. Since 2018 the band signed with Rock Zone Records in Hamburg, Germany and performed in popular venues and humanitarian action in Germany mainly supporting the Tommy Weisbecker Haus.

== Musical style ==
The musical concept of The ReAktion is founded on spirituality and the belief of metempsychosis by agreeing as being musicians. Their tuning is on the pythagorean tuning A432Hz, and their compositions are inspired by the mandelbrot set. The band has described and agrees; that this is what has given them exposure to the worldwide music industry, since most of the members where born in a culturally isolated country. Their style is mostly define as alternative rock with variations to alternative metal. Their overall compositions are made by guitar, bass, drums and in some songs synths.

== Discography ==
=== Albums ===
- Selknam (2015)
- Similitude (2017)
- What a Day (2020)

=== EPs ===
- BeLIEve in rEVOlution (2011)
- Enter the fourth dimension (2012)
- Teach me How to stop the world (2012)

=== Rare tracks ===
- Everything is gonna be Alright (2018)
- Not Afraid (2018)
- Eye (2018)

== Band members ==
=== Current members ===
- Simon "Nowis" Rojas Hoces – vocals
- Esteban Domić – bass
- Ernesto "Virgo" Domić – drums
- Sergej Lemez - lead guitar

=== Former members ===
- Benjamin Villaseca – lead guitar
- Diego Sagredo – lead guitar, vocals, synths
- Leonardo Signorelli – drums
- Phillip Monypenny – bass
- Felipe "Ikaro" Álvarez – drums, synths
- Garrett Wolf – bass
- Gianfranco Signorelli – synths
- Alvaro Monzón – lead guitar
- Patricio Gonzáles – synths
