= Suicide King (album) =

Studio album by King 810
- Released: January 25, 2019
- Genre: Nu metal
- Length: 40:32
- Label: Independent
- Producers: Josh Schroeder; David Gunn

King 810 chronology
La Petite Mort or a Conversation with God (2016)	Suicide King (2019)	AK Concerto No. 47, 11th Movement in G Major (2021)

Suicide King is the third studio album by American heavy metal band King 810. Released on January 25, 2019, the work was published independently by the ensemble and produced by Josh Schroeder and David Gunn in Michigan.

== Background ==
In 2017–2018, drummer Andrew Workman, guitarist Andrew Beal and the band parted ways. In October 2018, the group released a music video for "Heartbeats", the first single off of the album.

== Touring ==
In November 2018, the ensemble performed at the Buick City Events Center. Following this performance, the quartet spent November and December in the United Kingdom with PUPPY.

== Critical reception ==
Professional ratings
Review scores
Source	Rating
Distorted Sound	6/10
Metal Hammer	3.5/5 stars

Neil Criddle of Dead Press stated that "Heartbeats" "sets things off perfectly, with a frenetically aggressive chorus with Gunn's lyrical pace intensifying, culminating in a real sense of urgency and vitality".

Stephen Hill of Metal Hammer stated that "album closer "Sing Me to Sleep" has a dreamy, robotic nightmare vibe, "Wade in the Water" addresses the Flint, Michigan water crisis using old blues and Tom Waits-esque dark crooning and album highlight "Black Rifle" is a piano-led ballad with a funeral stomp that recalls the gravel-voiced acoustic hip hop of Everlast".

== Track listing ==
No.	Title	Length
1.	"Heartbeats"	3:26
2.	"Braveheart"	3:58
3.	"Bang Guns"	3:50
4.	"A Million Dollars"	4:05
5.	".45"	3:26
6.	"What's Gotten Into Me"	3:05
7.	"Black Rifle"	4:17
8.	"God Is Watching"	3:36
9.	"Wade in the Water"	4:56
10.	"Sing Me to Sleep"	5:50
Total length:		40:32

== Personnel ==
King 810

- David Gunn – vocals
- Eugene Gill – bass, guitars
