= Memoirs of a Murderer (album) =

Studio album by King 810
- Released: August 18, 2014
- Genres: Nu metal; alternative metal; melodic metalcore
- Length: 67:53
- Label: Roadrunner
- Producers: Justyn Pilbrow; Josh Schroeder; King 810

King 810 chronology
Proem (2014)	Memoirs of a Murderer (2014)	La Petite Mort or a Conversation with God (2016)

Singles from Memoirs of a Murder
- 1. "Fat Around the Heart" Released: July 3, 2014

Professional ratings
Review scores
Source	Rating
Classic Rock	3/5 stars
Metal Storm	5/10
MetalSucks	1.5/5 stars
Sputnikmusic	1/5

Memoirs of a Murderer is the debut studio album by American heavy metal band King 810 which was released on August 18, 2014, via Roadrunner Records. The album contains four tracks that were originally featured on both of the band's previous EPs (Midwest Monsters and Proem) along with 12 original songs, making a total of 16 songs. The album is the first of the band's efforts to chart, peaking at 18 on the Top Hard Rock Albums and eight on the Top Heatseekers, making this their most successful release to date.

== Background ==
Before the band announced the album, they had released two EPs; Midwest Monsters and Proem, both of which contained tracks that would feature onto this album. After they released Midwest Monsters, they were signed to Roadrunner Records to release Proem in June, to then announce this album a month after its release. The band had previously recorded material for a full-length studio album in 2008 but under the label Equal Vision Records with Chiodos guitarist Jason Hale, however, the band dropped from the label with Jason Hale departing from the band and no album was released, details regarding those recorded songs have not been revealed since.

== Release and promotion ==
When the album was announced, the band released a music video in July for the album's single "Fat Around the Heart", directed by John 'Quig' Quigley who has directed music videos for the likes of Eminem and Kid Rock. The next music video release was in August for the song "War Outside" which featured footage from the band's performance at 2014's Mayhem Festival. Then they released a music video for "State of Nature" in the same month. The album successfully released in August and is the first album to chart, peaking at 18 on the Top Hard Rock Albums and eight on the Top Heatseekers, making this their most successful release to date. They later released a music video in October for the song "Murder Murder Murder", then finally another one for "Desperate Lovers" in December. Along with the announcement of the album was plans to tour across the UK as a part of the Download Freezes Over tour in September. The band toured as a support act for Slipknot along with Korn, starting in Knotfest in San Bernardino, California in October and ending in the UK in January. As a means to promote the album further, they released a live promotional video, featuring footage of the band touring with the song "Desperate Lovers". In February 2015, the band's song "Killem All" was featured on Soundwave's compilation album Soundwave 2015 through Sony Music. In 2015, music videos for the songs for "Eyes (Sleep It All Away)" and "Devil Don't Cry" were also released.

== Track listing ==
All tracks are written by King 810.

No.	Title	Length
1.	"Killem All" (^{α})	3:31
2.	"Best Nite of My Life"	3:23
3.	"Murder Murder Murder" (^{β})	4:52
4.	"Take It"	3:27
5.	"Fat Around the Heart" (^{α})	3:49
6.	"Treading and Trodden"	3:47
7.	"Anatomy 1:2"	4:27
8.	"Eyes"	4:20
9.	"Desperate Lovers" (^{α})	4:29
10.	"Boogeymen"	4:41
11.	"Devil Don't Cry"	4:12
12.	"Anatomy 1:3"	5:08
13.	"Carve My Name"	4:39
14.	"War Outside"	4:09
15.	"Write About Us"	3:56
16.	"State of Nature"	5:03
Total length:		67:53

^α Was originally released on the Proem EP.
^β Was re-recorded from the Midwest Monsters EP.

== Personnel ==
King 810

- David Gunn – vocals
- Eugene Gill – bass
- Andrew Beal – guitars
- Andrew Workman – drums

Additional musicians

- Gregg August – contrabass
- Sara Caswell – violin
- Noah Hoffeld – cello
- Lois Martin – violin

Production

- Josh Schroeder – production, engineering, mixing
- Justyn Pilbrow – mixing, production
- Brian Crowe – engineering
- Ted Jensen – mastering
- Sean Mosher-Smith – art direction, photo illustration

Management

- Mike Liguori – A&R
- David Rath – A&R

== Chart history ==
Chart (2014)	Peak position
UK Albums (Official Charts)	76
US Top Hard Rock Albums (Billboard)	18
US Heatseekers Albums (Billboard)	8

== Release history ==
Region	Date	Format	Label	Catalog no.
Worldwide	August 18, 2014	Digital	Roadrunner	Unknown
Worldwide	August 19, 2014	CD	Roadrunner	#RR 75662
