= Andrew Velasquez =

American government official (born 1968)

Andrew Velasquez III
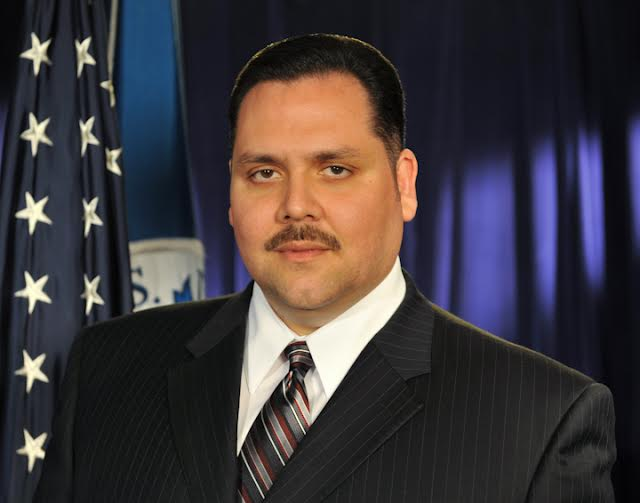

Former Regional Administrator of the Federal Emergency Management Agency Region V
- In office 2010 – January 20, 2017
- President: Barack Obama

Personal details
- Born: July 26, 1968 (age 58) Chicago, Illinois, U.S.
- Education: Illinois State University; Saint Xavier University; Naval Postgraduate School

Andrew Velasquez III is the former Regional Administrator for the U.S. Department of Homeland Security's Federal Emergency Management Agency (FEMA), Region V. He coordinated preparedness, response, recovery, and mitigation activities for the states of Illinois, Indiana, Michigan, Minnesota, Ohio, and Wisconsin. Prior to his appointment as Region V administrator he served as Director of the Illinois Emergency Management Agency and Executive Director of Chicago's Office of Emergency Management and Communication.

== Early life and education ==
Velasquez was born and raised in Chicago's West Humboldt Park neighborhood and is a strong believer in mentoring youth and aspiring Emergency Managers.

The son of Mexican and Puerto Rican parents, he attended Lane Technical High School on Chicago's north side. After graduation, Velasquez served six years in the U.S. Army Reserve. Shortly after enlisting in the Army Reserve, he attended Illinois State University to pursue a bachelor's degree in Criminal justice, which he received in 1993. During his time at Illinois State, he was elected to student government, serving as director of Human Rights and Advocacy, as well as president of the Criminal Justice Association.

After receiving his undergraduate degree, he stayed on at Illinois State University and completed a Master of Science in Criminal Justice in 1994. He is a member of the Sigma Lambda Beta fraternity and is still actively involved. In 2010, he was inducted into the Illinois State University Alumni Hall of Fame. [4]

He received a Masters of Business Administration from St. Xavier University and profiled as an Alumni Achiever in 2010. He also completed the Naval Post Graduate School's Executive Leadership program in both Homeland Defense and Radiological Emergency Preparedness and was featured in the school's publication for his appointment to FEMA.

== City of Chicago ==
Velasquez began his career with the City of Chicago working with the Chicago Police Department (CPD) for over 10 years, most recently as the Director of the Identification and Records Services Division, overseeing the criminal identification of arrested persons, latent fingerprint processing, criminal warrants, offender extradition and subpoena processing.

After his tenure with the CPD, he moved over to the Office of Emergency Management and Communications (OEMC) where he assumed responsibility as Managing Deputy for 911 Operations. Mayor Richard M. Daley subsequently appointed Velasquez to lead Chicago's Office of Emergency Management and Communications as its Executive Director, a cabinet-level appointment, overseeing emergency management, homeland security, preparedness, response, traffic management and 911 emergency dispatch operations.

While at the OEMC, Velasquez oversaw many modernization projects including the implementation of a mobile disaster command center, closed circuit camera installation in the Central Business District and the move into the new state of the art City Incident Center.

His leadership helped make Chicago a nationwide model for a unified approach emergency preparedness, homeland security and 911 emergency communications.

Velasquez was profiled in Crain's Chicago Business as "Chicago's Go-To Emergency Relief Man" and for "Preparing Chicago for the Worst."

== Director Illinois Emergency Management Agency (IEMA) ==
From 2007 to 2010 Velasquez was named by the Blagojevich and Quinn Administrations to serve in their cabinets both as Director of the Illinois Emergency Management Agency (IEMA) and as Homeland Security Advisor. In these positions, Velasquez oversaw Illinois' disaster preparedness, response, nuclear safety and homeland security programs. As the IEMA Director, he oversaw the response and recovery efforts for numerous large-scale disasters and served as the state coordinating officer and Governor's authorized representative for nine presidentially declared disasters, including major floods, tornados, ice storms and a campus shooting event.

== FEMA Region V Administrator ==
President Barack Obama appointed him in 2010 as FEMA Administrator for Region V. In addition to directing the delivery of federal disaster assistance for numerous presidential declared disasters and emergencies, Velasquez implemented a number of key initiatives. These initiatives focused on enhancing the region's readiness posture with an emphasis on leveraging technology and data for analysis and decision support to improve response and recovery operations, individual and community preparedness and planning for all types of threats and hazards.

Velasquez initiated and exercised leadership over the development of a comprehensive operational plan to address the effects of an Improvised Nuclear Device detonation in a large metropolitan area. This integrated planning effort included FEMA Region V, the States of Illinois, Indiana and Wisconsin, the City of Chicago and surrounding counties and various private sector entities. Velasquez has also served a key role in FEMA's support of North Atlantic Treaty Organization (NATO) Civil Emergency Planning Committee events.

As a keynote speaker for the NATO 2012 High Visibility Event seminar in Brussels, Velasquez presented an overview of U.S. planning efforts in support of NATO's 2012 Chicago summit and participated in a facilitated discussion on high visibility incident scenarios. This seminar assisted allied and partner nations in consideration of their planning factors for events such as the EuroVision Song contest, Sochi Winter Olympics and future Olympic bids.

In 2015, Velasquez provided the keynote address to the NATO Civil Protection Group seminar on Catastrophic Emergency Planning in Finland. His keynote address highlighted FEMA Region V's catastrophic earthquake and nuclear incident planning efforts and catastrophic planning in improving overall emergency operations. Velasquez has also supported the U.S. Mission to NATO in outreach to NATO's partner nations.

Velasquez also served as the Acting Region IV Administrator for a 6-month period supporting the states of Alabama, Florida, Georgia, Kentucky, Mississippi, North Carolina, South Carolina and Tennessee. He was charged with the critical responsibility of ensuring effective readiness in preparation for the 2014 Hurricane Season.

== Other notable works ==
Velasquez is a member of the University of Chicago faculty where he teaches courses on risk management and technology strategy and information systems. He continues to serve as a lecturer at the University of Chicago on a variety of homeland security topics and has been published in several notable academic journals including the Harvard University Crisis Response Journal.

He has been inducted into the Illinois State University Alumni Hall of Fame and has been profiled in the St. Xavier and ISU alumni magazines.
