= Project46 =

Project 46
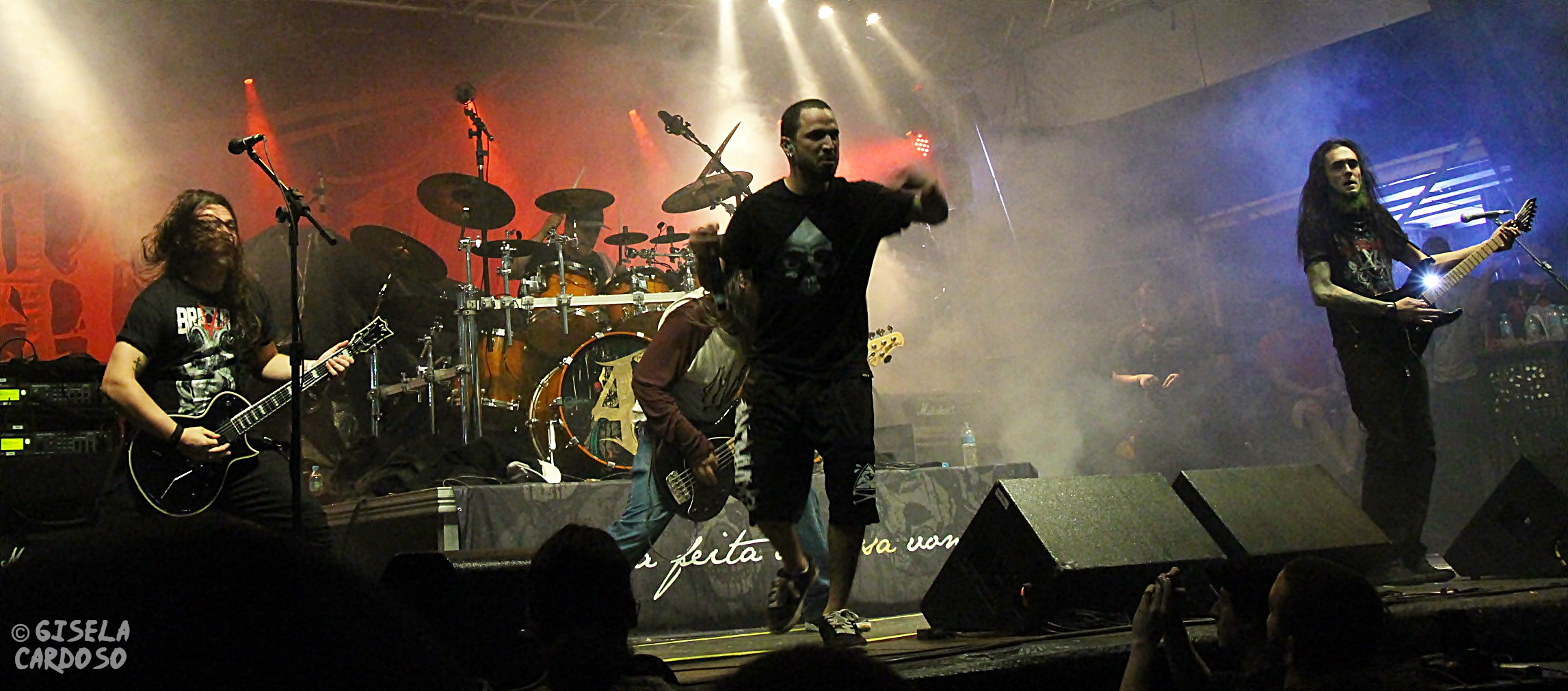
- Project46 at Roça'n'Roll Festival 2014, Varginha, Minas Gerais, Brazil

Background information
- Origin: São Paulo, Brazil
- Genres: Heavy metal
- Years active: 2008–present
- Members: Caio MacBeserra; Vini Castellari; Baffo Neto; Pedro Japa Drummer
- Past members: Gui Figueiredo; Rafael Yamada; Henrique Pucci; Jean Patton; Betto Cardoso; Bruno Santin
- Website: www.project46.com.br

Project46 is a heavy metal band from São Paulo, Brazil. Since forming in 2008 by guitarists and childhood friends Jean Patton and Vinicius Castellari, the quintet has released one EP and three full-length albums, and have played several large rock and metal festivals in and around Brazil and South America. Known for their politically and socially controversial lyrics, Project46's popularity outside of Brazil has been steadily growing. The band debuted on American satellite radio in 2015 by José Manguin of Sirius XM Radio's Liquid Metal, who played "Caos Renomeado" from their 2014 album Que Seja Feita a Nossa Vontade.

Project46 played at the 30th anniversary of Rock in Rio, September 24, 2015 in Rio de Janeiro, opening for Halestorm, Lamb of God and Deftones.

== History ==
Project46 started as a Slipknot tribute band named Kroach, but evolved into writing original music and taking on the moniker "Project46" to pay homage to Slipknot members #4 and #6. The band initially experimented with lyrics in English on their first release, 2009's E.P., If You Want Your Survival Sign Wake up Tomorrow, which included four tracks and was released independently.

Their first full-length album, Doa a Quem Doer, was produced by notable Brazilian metal producer, Adair Daufembach, and released independently in 2011. Shortly after its release, the band announced that Henrique Pucci would replace Gui Figueiredo as drummer.

In November 2012, Project46 played their first shows outside of Brazil. Invited to play the 2012 Maquinaria Festival in Chile, they shared the stage with such acts as Cavalera Conspiracy, Stone Sour and Slayer. Footage from this performance was used in the video for "Acorda Pra Vida".

They opened São Paulo's Monsters of Rock Festival in 2013, when fans voted them in as the local act to open the two-day festival. They warmed up the crowd for Gojira, Korn and Slipknot on day one.

Project46's rendition of Slipknot's "Heretic Anthem" was chosen as the "Best Slipknot Cover 2013" by the Fans of Slipknot Facebook page, which helped introduce the band to an international audience.

Towards the end of 2013, they began recording their next full-length album, again pairing up with producer Adair Daufembach. Their sophomore effort, "Que Seja Feita a Nossa Vontade", was released by the Wikimetal Music label in April 2014, with an album release party dubbed "46Fest", held at the Carioca Club in São Paulo.

Their third studio album, Tr3s, was released in 2017. The album has won "Best National Album" in Brazil, as voted by readers of Roadie Magazine. The album was produced by Adair Daufembach and recorded at his Los Angeles-based studio.

In 22 August 2023, Jean Patton announced he was leaving the band. The band announced a last tour with Jean Patton, Terra de Ninguém Tour, between September and November 2023, will be a farewell tour regarding the guitarist.

== Band members ==
Current Members

- Caio MacBeserra – vocals (2008–present)
- Vinicius Castellari – guitar (2008–present)
- Baffo Neto – bass (2016–present)
- Pedro Japa Drummer – drums (2024–present)

Former Members

- Gui Figueiredo – drums (2008–2011)
- Rafael Yamada – bass, vocals (2008–2016)
- Henrique Pucci – drums (2011–2016)
- Jean Patton – guitar (2008–2023)
- Betto Cardoso – drums (2016–2024)
- Bruno Santin – drums (2024)

== Discography ==
- If You Want Your Survival Sign Wake up Tomorrow (2009; EP)
- Doa a Quem Doer (2011)
- Live at Inferno Club (2012; Live album)
- Que Seja Feita a Nossa Vontade (2014)
- TR3S (2017)
