= List of Slipknot concert tours =

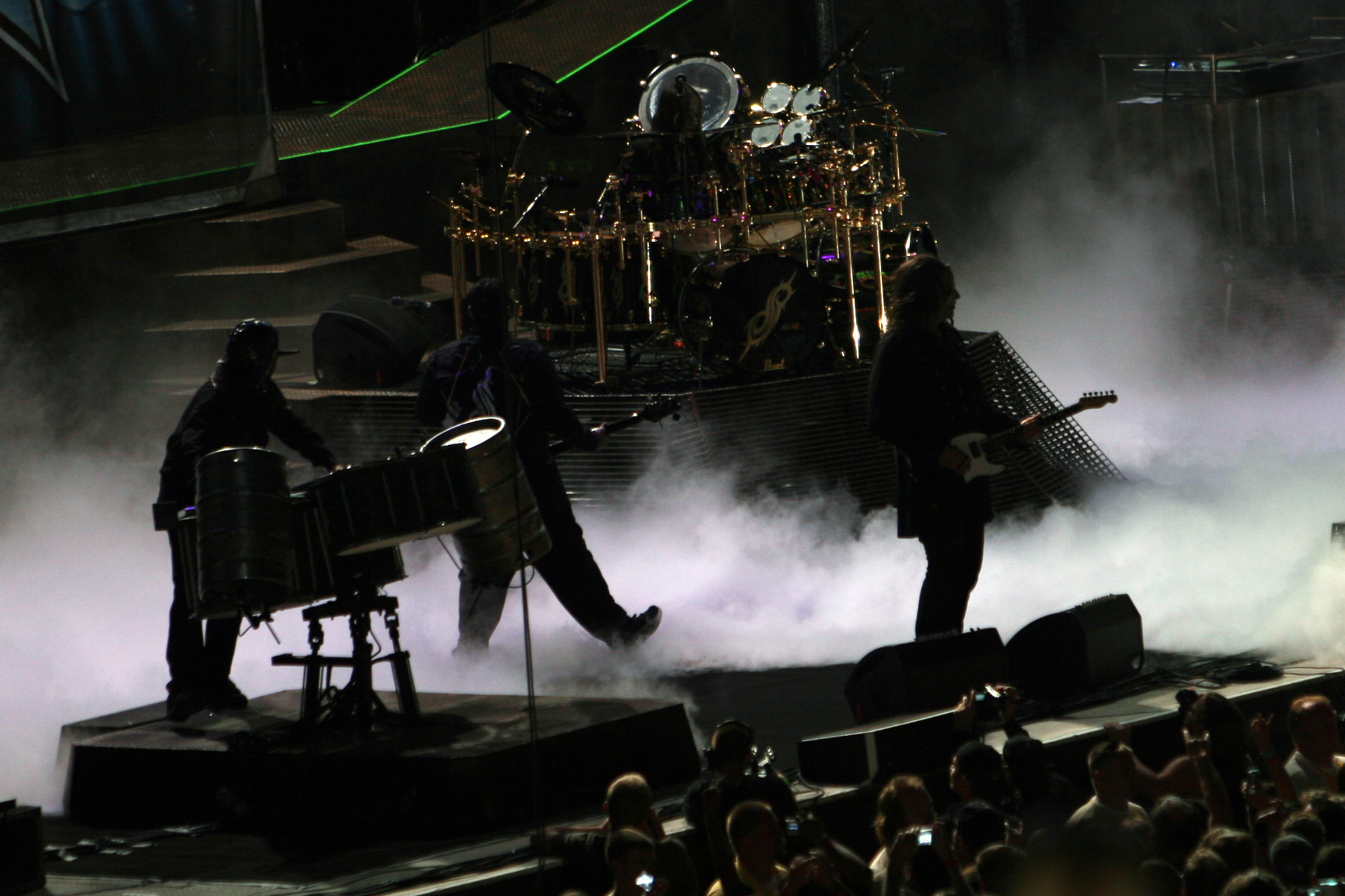
Slipknot at the Mayhem Festival 2008 (from left to right): Chris Fehn, Paul Gray, Joey Jordison, Jim Root

Slipknot is an American heavy metal band from Des Moines, Iowa, formed in 1995. The band's first concert tour was of the United States with the 1999 Ozzfest, a festival founded in 1996 featuring live performances by heavy metal bands. After the Livin la Vida Loco tour, the band embarked in November 1999 on its first international circuit, the World Domination Tour. After being on the road for a year through North America, Europe, Japan, and Australia, the band briefly attended Tattoo the Earth, during which the band recorded the performance at Dynamo Open Air and later released it as part of the film 10 Years of Life Death Love Hate Pain Scars Victory War Blood and Destruction.

Slipknot's first headlining world tour was launched in May 2001, in support of its second studio album, Iowa. The band toured for almost 15 months, and included a performance at the London Arena which was filmed for Disasterpieces, as well as the 2001 Ozzfest.

The next world tour, The Subliminal Verses World Tour, lasted over 20 months and had over 230 concerts. The tour also brought about Slipknot's first official live album, 9.0: Live. During the tour, the band performed the song "Purity," which was taken off the 1999 debut album due to copyright infringement. Slipknot performed songs that are rarely played live, such as "Iowa" and "Get This", as well as the first live performance of "Skin Ticket".

The All Hope Is Gone World Tour came after the release of the fourth studio album, All Hope Is Gone, in 2008. The band toured in Israel, Luxembourg and several other countries where it had never performed in before. During the tour, the drummer Joey Jordison and the DJ Sid Wilson broke an ankle, and both ankles respectively. Most of Slipknot's concerts were performed with the following band members: Sid Wilson, Joey Jordison, Paul Gray, Chris Fehn, Jim Root, Craig Jones, Shawn Crahan, Mick Thomson, and Corey Taylor. However, some shows were performed a few members short, usually due to injuries.

== Headlining tours ==
Years	Title	Legs and durations	Number of performances
1999–2000	World Domination Tour	First leg: November 28, 1999 – July 13, 2000 (North America, Europe, Japan, Australia); Second leg: October 24 – November 1, 2000 (USA)	110
Slipknot's first international tour started in November 1999 in North America. Slipknot was initially supported in by Biohazard and Step Kings, but upon returning to North America after ten dates in Europe, they were supported by Kittie and Will Haven. During their return to Europe in March 2000 they were supported by One Minute Silence and Kittie. The second leg included concerts in the US, in October and November 2000.
2000	Tattoo the Earth	July 14 – August 14, 2000 (United States)	21
This 2000 US included Slipknot as co-headliners along the likes of Slayer and Sevendust. The summer part of the tour posed a challenge to Slipknot, as members found their masks to be extremely uncomfortable, even under the best circumstances. The concert at Dynamo Open Air was released as part of the 2009 DVD 10 Years of Life Death Love Hate Pain Scars Victory War Blood and Destruction. Other bands that performed during this tour alongside Slipknot were Iron Maiden, Spineshank, Sepultura, Mudvayne, Nashville Pussy, Hed PE, downset., and Puya. Later, the compilation album Tattoo The Earth: The First Crusade was released containing two songs the band performed live on the tour.
2001–02	Iowa World Tour	"Kill the Industry": May 17 – June 2, 2001 (Europe) "Ozzfest 2001": June 9 – August 12, 2001 (North America) "Pledge of Allegiance": September 21 – October 31, 2001 (USA) "European Iowa Tour": January 22 – February 20, 2002; Japanese leg: March 18–28, 2002; European Open Air leg: August 20–29, 2002	131
This was Slipknot's first headlining world concert tour, as was in support of their second studio album, Iowa. Musicians that accompanied Slipknot in the "Kill the Industry" part included Papa Roach, Mudvayne, and The Union Underground. At Ozzfest, Slipknot performed on the main stage after Papa Roach and before Marilyn Manson. During "Pledge of Allegiance", Slipknot co-headlined with System Of A Down, while being supported by the bands Rammstein, American Head Charge, Mudvayne, and No One. The European leg was intended to begin around the September 11 attacks, but because of the incident, the dates were postponed to February 2002. The performance at the London Arena, a nearly sold out concert, was filmed for their quadruple platinum DVD, Disasterpieces. The Japanese leg included two shows in the Tokyo Bay NK Hall in Tokyo, and the last European leg, starting with the Festival Ilha Do Ermal.
2004–05	The Subliminal Verses World Tour	"Jägermeister Music Tour": March 30 – May 24, 2004 (USA, UK) "Metallica European Open Air Tour": May 26 – July 7, 2004 "Ozzfest 2004": July 10 – August 2, 2004 (USA) "The Unholy Alliance Tour": August 22 – November 13, 2004 (Europe, Asia); Canadian leg: January 7–16, 2005; Australian leg: January 21 – February 6, 2005; 2005 World Tour: March 4 – August 22, 2005 (USA, Europe, Asia); South American leg: September 18–30, 2005 "The Final Volume Tour": October 14 – November 15, 2005 (USA)	233
Slipknot's second world tour lasted 28 months and was in support of their third studio album Vol. 3: (The Subliminal Verses). During the first US leg, "Jägermeister Music Tour," the band was supported by Fear Factory, Chimaira, and other local bands, while the European leg had Slipknot play as opening band for Metallica. Next, Slipknot joined the Ozzfest in 2004 for their third time, being the first band that performed for the second stage, and was preceded by the band Hatebreed. Returning to Europe, Slipknot played alongside Slayer, Mastodon and Hatebreed in the first edition of "The Unholy Alliance Tour". After Canadian and Australian legs, and a New Zealand leg that included the "Big Day Out" festival, Slipknot returned to the United States supported by Lamb of God and Shadows Fall. Shows in Singapore, Tokyo and Las Vegas were recorded, and released in 2006 in the Platinum video album Voliminal: Inside the Nine. Slipknot also went to South America for the first time while on tour. The world tour ended with an American tour called "The Final Volume" where they were supported by Unearth, As I Lay Dying, and Dillinger Escape Plan. The tour also brought about Slipknot's first official live album, 9.0: Live. During the tour, Slipknot performed the song "Purity," which was previously taken off their 1999 debut album due to copyright infringement. Slipknot also performed songs that are rarely played live, such as "Iowa" and "Get This", as well as the first live performance of "Skin Ticket".
2008–09	All Hope Is Gone World Tour	"Mayhem Festival": July 9 – August 18, 2008 (North America); Asian leg: October 8–30, 2008 (Japan, Australia, New Zealand); European leg: November 5 – December 15, 2008; US Arena leg: January 23 – March 11, 2009; Canadian leg: April 28 – May 2, 2009; US leg III: May 3–16, 2009; European leg II: June 6 – July 11, 2009; US/Canadian leg: October 10–31, 2009	153
The third world tour was in support of the band's fourth studio album, All Hope Is Gone. During the opening date of the "Mayhem Festival 2008," turntablist Sid Wilson broke both of his heels and performed on the rest of the tour in a wheelchair. Slipknot headlined the first edition of the festival, and was supported by the likes of Disturbed, DragonForce, and Mastodon. The festival drew the largest number of people at a metal festival since Slipknot played at Ozzfest in 2004. Supported by Machine Head, the band also played for the first time in front of Australian crowds with its full rig. During the first of the European legs, supported by Machine Head and Children of Bodom, the performance in London on December 3, 2008 was recorded for MTV's World Stage series and aired on March 13, 2009 in the UK. It was also made available in over 160 countries. In 2009, the band alternated playing in the United States, Canada and Europe, playing along with bands such as Korn, Staind, Alice in Chains, Deftones, Cypress Hill, and Sublime. Slipknot's performance on June 13, 2009 at Download Festival was streamed live on the internet and was released on their fourth video album entitled (sic)nesses. The world tour ended with a US leg in celebration of the 10 year anniversary of their initial released album, where the band was supported by Deftones.
2011–12	Memorial World Tour	June 17, 2011 - August 18, 2012	52
The fourth world tour was in honor of the late bass player Paul Gray who died on May 24, 2010.
2014–16	Prepare for Hell Tour	North American leg: October 25, 2014 – December 7, 2014; European leg: January 14, 2015 – February 15, 2015; Soundwave: February 21, 2015 – March 1, 2015; US leg: April 25, 2015 – May 16, 2015; European leg II: June 5–20, 2015; Summer's Last Stand Tour: July 24, 2015 – September 5, 2015; South American leg: September 25, 2015 – October 3, 2015; North American leg II: October 13–25, 2015; European Tour: January 18, 2016 – February 15, 2016; North American leg III: June 18, 2016 – August 27, 2016; US leg II: September 27–30, 2016; Latin American leg: October 16–22, 2016; Australian & New Zealand leg: October 26–31, 2016; Asian leg: November 3–6, 2016	194
The fifth world tour, in support of the band's fifth studio album .5: The Gray Chapter.
2019–21	We Are Not Your Kind World Tour	Europe: June 7, 2019 - July 5, 2019; Knotfest Roadshow: July 8, 2019 - October 11, 2019; South America: November 23, 2019 - December 6, 2019; Europe: January 14, 2020 - February 24, 2020; Knotfest Roadshow: September 25, 2021 - November 2, 2021	84
The sixth world tour, in support of the band's sixth studio album We Are Not Your Kind.

== Other performances ==
Years	Title	Duration	Number of performances
1999	Ozzfest	May 27 – July 24, 1999 (United States)	28
Ozzfest is an annual festival tour of the United States (and in some years, Europe) featuring performances by many heavy metal and hard rock musical groups. In mid-1999, Slipknot performed at an Ozzfest for the first time ever, along the likes of Black Sabbath, Slayer, Deftones, Primus, Godsmack, Fear Factory, System of a Down, and Static-X.
1999	Livin la Vida Loco	August 19 – November 14, 1999 (United States)	72
Livin La Vida Loco, a play on the song title "Livin' la Vida Loca" by Ricky Martin, was a concert tour in the United States and Canada in 1999, that included Slipknot. It was headlined by the band Coal Chamber, and organized by the band's record label, Roadrunner Records. Aside from Slipknot and Coal Chamber, other bands that were featured in the tour included Machine Head and Amen.
