= Germania Insurance Amphitheater =

Sports and concert venue in Texas

- COTA Amphitheater

- Verizon conducting a drone venue inspection at the Amphitheater
- Interactive map of Germania Insurance Amphitheater
- Former names: Tower Amphitheater (2012-2013); Austin 360 Amphitheater (2013-2019)
- Address: 9201 Circuit of the Americas Blvd; Austin, Texas; 78617
- Location: Austin, Texas, United States
- Coordinates: 30°7′58″N 97°38′28″W
- Owner: Circuit of the Americas LLC
- Operator: Live Nation
- Seating type: Reserved, Floor and Lawn
- Capacity: 14,000
- Type: Outdoor Amphitheatre
- Public transit: Capital Metro

Construction
- Built: October 21, 2012
- Opened: November 17, 2012
- Cost: US$62 million
- Architect: Miró Rivera Architects
- General contractor: Austin Commercial

Website
- Germania Insurance Amphitheater

The Germania Insurance Amphitheater (originally the Tower Amphitheater, then Austin360 Amphitheater) called for sponsorship reasons, is an outdoor amphitheater that is part of the Circuit of the Americas (COTA) located in Austin, Texas, USA. The venue opened in November 2012 with a capacity of 14,000. There are 6,700 fixed reserved seats. Another 1,700 seats can be configured on the stage-front floor or alternately configured for standing room for 2,300. The remaining general admission spots are on a sloping grass area behind the reserved seats. The Amphitheater won the Best New Major Concert Venue Award by Pollstar in 2013. It has been recognized as a Modern Steel Construction in 2015 by the American Institute of Steel Construction winning the 2015 IDEAS2 Awards.

== History ==
On July 23, 2012, COTA announced a booking agreement with Live Nation to book major concerts at an open air amphitheater to be built at the base of the observation tower. Designed by Miró Rivera Architects, the venue opened in April 2013 with a concert by Kenny Chesney.

The venue was originally going to be called Tower Amphitheater, but under a deal closed in March 2013, was renamed to Austin360 Amphitheater, with naming rights sold to the entertainment/events website associated with the Austin American-Statesman. Beginning January 1, 2020, COTA renamed the venue the Germania Insurance Amphitheater under a seven-year deal with the Brenham, Texas based insurance company.

== Naming history ==
- Tower Amphitheater (July 23, 2012 – March 6, 2013)
- Austin 360 Amphitheater (March 6, 2013 – January 1, 2020)
- Germania Insurance Amphitheater (January 1, 2020 – present)

== Logo Changes ==
The debut name for the Amphitheater

Sponsor naming rights given to Austin American-Statesman from 2013 to 2019.

Germania Insurance gets the naming rights in 2019 to present. This is the current logo.

== Performances ==
The Amphitheater has seen performances by notable acts like Kiss, Snoop Dogg, Willie Nelson and LCD Soundsystem.

List of Performers at the Germania Insurance Amphitheater
Date	Headliner	Opening acts	Event	Additional information
17.11.2012	Collective Soul		2012 Formula 1 United States Grand Prix	as the Tower Amphitheater
18.11.2012	Clay Walker		2012 Formula 1 United States Grand Prix	as the Tower Amphitheater
05.04.2013	Kenny Chesney	Eli Young Band, Kacey Musgraves	No Shoes Nation Tour	
18.04.2013	Zac Brown Band	Jerry Douglas, Levi Lowrey	Uncaged Tour	
20.04.2013	The Bright Light Social Hour		Motorcycle Grand Prix of the Americas	
26.04.2013	The Lumineers	Sam Doores and the Tumbleweeds	The Lumineers World Tour	
03.05.2013	Jimmy Buffett & The Coral Reefer Band	Jackson Browne	Songs from St. Somewhere Tour	postponed from May 2 for bad weather
05.05.2013	Jason Aldean	Jake Owen, Thomas Rhett	Night Train Tour	
22.05.2013	Dave Matthews Band	The Bright Light Social Hour	Away from the World Tour	postponed from May 21 for bad weather
31.05.2013	The Avett Brothers	Grace Potter and the Nocturnals, Dawes	The Carpenter Tour	
08.06.2013	Mumford & Sons		Summer Stampede Tour	
09.06.2013	Mumford & Sons		Summer Stampede Tour	
25.07.2013	Wiz Khalifa	A$AP Rocky, B.o.B, Trinidad Jame$, Joey Bada$$ & Pro Era, Berner, Chevy Woods, Smoke DZA	Under the Influence of Music Tour	
02.08.2013	Rob Zombie	Five Finger Death Punch, Mastodon, Amon Amarth, Children of Bodom, Emmure, Born of Osiris, Motionless in White, Thrown Into Exile, Machine Head, Job for a Cowboy, Butcher Babies, Battlecross, Huntress, City in the Sea	Mayhem Festival 2013	
04.08.2013	Train	The Script, Gavin DeGraw	Mermaids of Alcatraz Tour	
15.08.2013	Keith Urban	Little Big Town, Dustin Lynch	Light the Fuse Tour	Keith Urban could not perform due to power outage caused by thunderstorms.
17.08.2013	Lil Wayne	T.I., 2 Chainz, G-Eazy	America's Most Wanted Music Festival 2013	
23.08.2013	Dave Chappelle	Flight of the Conchords, Al Madrigal, Chris D’Elia, Demetri Martin, Hannibal Buress, Kristen Schaal, Brody Stevens	Oddball Comedy & Curiosity Festival 2013	
10.09.2013	Iron Maiden	Megadeth	Maiden England World Tour	
18.09.2013	Maroon 5	Kelly Clarkson, PJ Morton	12th Annual Honda Civic Tour	
27.09.2013	Miranda Lambert	Dierks Bentley, Charlie Worsham	Locked and Reloaded Tour	
01.11.2013	Paramore	Metric, Hellogoodbye	The Self-Titled Tour	
16.11.2013	Sick Puppies		2013 Formula 1 United States Grand Prix	
17.11.2013	Pitbull		2013 Formula 1 United States Grand Prix	
10.04.2014	Arcade Fire	Lost Bayou Ramblers, Kid Koala	Reflektor Tour	
13.04.2014	Bob Schneider		Red Bull Grand Prix of The Americas	
01.05.2014	tobyMac	Skillet, Lecrae	Eye on It Tour	
23.05.2014	Lynyrd Skynyrd	Justin Moore, Rodney Carrington, Drew Thomas	RedFest Austin 2014	
24.05.2014	Tim McGraw	Kip Moore, Larry the Cable Guy, Big & Rich Kenny Wayne Shepherd, Love and Theft	RedFest Austin 2014	
25.05.2014	Florida Georgia Line	Jeff Foxworthy, Kellie Pickler, Easton Corbin Craig Morgan	RedFest Austin 2014	
31.05.2014	Jimmy Buffett & The Coral Reefer Band		Songs from St. Somewhere Tour	
06.06.2014	Pretty Lights	Dillon Francis, Slightly Stoopid, Fmlybnd	X Games Austin 2014	
07.06.2014	Kanye West	Mac Miller, Bad Religion, Wavves	X Games Austin 2014	
08.06.2014	The Flaming Lips	Gary Clark Jr., Mayer Hawthorne	X Games Austin 2014	
20.06.2014	Blake Shelton	The Band Perry, Neal McCoy, Dan + Shay	Ten Times Crazier Tour	
04.07.2014	Austin Symphony Orchestra		38th annual H-E-B Austin Symphony July 4 Concert and Fireworks	
10.07.2014	Lionel Richie	CeeLo Green	All the Hits All Night Long Tour	
11.07.2014	Rascal Flatts	Sheryl Crow, Gloriana	Rewind Tour	
12.07.2014	Kiss, Def Leppard	Kobra and the Lotus	Kiss 40th Anniversary World Tour	
02.08.2014	Fall Out Boy, Paramore	New Politics	Monumentour	
14.08.2014	Nine Inch Nails, Soundgarden	The Dillinger Escape Plan	Twenty Thirteen Tour	
23.08.2014	OneRepublic	Christina Perri, Jamie Scott	Native Summer Tour	
04.09.2014	Brad Paisley	Leah Turner, Charlie Worsham, Randy Houser	Country Nation World Tour	
06.09.2014	Drake, Lil Wayne		Drake vs. Lil Wayne Tour	
13.09.2014	Kings of Leon	Young the Giant, Kongos	Mechanical Bull Tour	
20.09.2014	Blue Öyster Cult		Lone Star Le Mans	
21.09.2014	Louis CK, Sarah Silverman	Hannibal Buress, Marc Maron, Reggie Watts, Whitney Cummings	Oddball Comedy & Curiosity Festival 2014	
02.11.2014	Kid Rock		2014 Formula 1 United States Grand Prix	
29.03.2015	Journey, Steve Miller Band	The Mighty Orq	|Eclipse Tour	
04.04.2015	Nickelback	Pop Evil	No Fixed Address Tour	
13.05.2015	Dave Matthews Band		North America Summer Tour 2015	
16.05.2015	Rush		R40 Live Tour	
21.05.2015	Kenny Chesney	Jake Owen, Chase Rice	The Big Revival Tour	
04.07.2015	Willie Nelson	Kacey Musgraves, Merle Haggard, Eric Church, Chris Stapleton, Kris Kristofferson, Sturgill Simpson, Jason Isbell	Willie Nelson's 4th of July Picnic	
12.07.2015	Tedeschi Trucks Band	Sharon Jones & The Dap-Kings, Doyle Bramhall II	North American Summer Tour 2015	
16.07.2015	Lady Antebellum	Hunter Hayes, Sam Hunt	Wheels Up Tour	
17.07.2015	Steely Dan	Elvis Costello & The Imposters	Rockabye Gollie Angel Tour	
23.07.2015	Chicago, Earth, Wind & Fire		Heart and Soul Tour 2015	
26.07.2015	Fall Out Boy, Wiz Khalifa	Hoodie Allen	Boys of Zummer Tour	
28.07.2015	Phish		North American Summer Tour 2015	
17.08.2015	Incubus, Deftones	Death from Above 1979	2015 North American Tour	
21.08.2015	Florida Georgia Line	Thomas Rhett, Frankie Ballard	Anything Goes 2015 Tour	
22.08.2015	J. Cole	Big Sean, YG, Jeremih, Bas, Cozz, Omen	Forest Hills Drive Tour	
23.08.2015	Def Leppard	Styx, Tesla	Def Leppard World Tour 2015	
28.08.2015	Dierks Bentley	Kip Moore, Maddie & Tae, Canaan Smith	Sounds of Summer Tour	
29.08.2015	Kelly Clarkson	Pentatonix, Eric Hutchinson, Abi Ann	Piece by Piece Tour	
02.09.2015	Slipknot	Lamb of God, Bullet for my Valentine, Motionless in White	Summer's Last Stand Tour	
09.09.2015	Chris Brown	French Montana, Kid Ink, Omarion, Fetty Wap, Teyana	One Hell of a Nite Tour	
21.09.2015	Van Halen	Kenny Wayne Shepherd Band	Van Halen 2015 North American Tour	
24.09.2015	Zedd	Madeon, Alex Metric	True Colors Tour	Flosstradamus as Special Guest
17.10.2015	Aziz Ansari	Amy Schumer, Bridget Everett, Jeff Ross, TJ Miller, Anthony Jeselnik, Ashley Barnhill, Nick Thune, Big Jay Oakerson	Oddball Comedy & Curiosity Festival 2015	
08.11.2015	Zac Brown Band	Drake White and The Big Fire	Jekyll + Hyde Tour	
22.04.2016	Duran Duran	CHIC ft. Nile Rodgers	Paper Gods on Tour	
05.05.2016	The 1975	Wolf Alice, The Japanese House	I Like It When You Sleep Tour	
17.05.2016	Daryl Hall & John Oates	Sharon Jones & The Dap-Kings, Trombone Shorty & Orleans Avenue	North America Summer Tour 2016	
18.05.2016	Journey, The Doobie Brothers	Dave Mason	Eclipse Tour	
19.05.2016	Florence + The Machine	Grimes	How Beautiful Tour	
18.06.2016	Darius Rucker	Dan + Shay, Michael Ray	The Good for a Good Time Tour	
24.06.2016	Slipknot	Marilyn Manson, Of Mice & Men	Prepare for Hell Tour	
04.07.2016	Willie Nelson		Willie Nelson's 4th of July Picnic	
06.07.2016	Twenty One Pilots	Mutemath, Chef'Special	Emotional Roadshow World Tour	
23.07.2016	Modest Mouse, Brand New		Brand New/Modest Mouse Tour	
02.08.2016	Rob Zombie, Korn		Return of the Dreads Tour	
05.08.2016	311, Sublime with Rome	Dirty Heads, Matisyahu, Tribal Seeds	UNITY TOUR 2016	
07.08.2016	Dixie Chicks	Vintage Trouble, Smooth Hound Smith	DCX MMXVI World Tour	
13.08.2016	Hank Williams Jr., Chris Stapleton		North America Summer Tour 2016	
16.08.2016	Gwen Stefani	EVE	This is What the Truth Feels Like Tour	
19.08.2016	Def Leppard	REO Speedwagon, Tesla	North America Summer Tour 2016	
21.08.2016	Snoop Dogg, Wiz Khalifa	Kevin Gates, Jhene Aiko, Casey Veggies, DJ Drama	The High Road Summer Tour	
27.08.2016	Marilyn Manson, Slipknot		The Hell Not Hallelujah Tour	
23.09.2016	Alabama Shakes	Corinne Bailey Rae	'Sound & Color' Tour	
24.09.2016	Dane Cook, Sebastian Maniscalco		Funny or Die Presents: Oddball Comedy and Curiosity Festival 2016	
29.09.2016	The Lumineers	BORNS, Rayland Baxter	Cleopatra World Tour	
16.10.2016	Toby Keith	David Lee Murphy, Waterloo Revival	Interstates & Tailgates 2016 Tour	
22.03.2017	blink-182	The Naked And Famous	California Tour	Presented by 101X
06.05.2017	Chance the Rapper, 6LACK, DJ Mr Rogers, Gucci Mane, Lil Uzi Vert, Migos, Pell, Snow Tha Product, Steve Aoki, YFN Lucci, Young Dolph		JMBLYA 2017 festival	
09.05.2017	Kings Of Leon	Deerhunter	2017 North American Tour	
20.05.2017	Train	O.A.R., Natasha Bedingfield	Play That Song Tour	
02.06.2017	Florida Georgia Line	Nelly, Chris Lane	Smooth Tour	
10.06.2017	MUSE	Thirty Seconds to Mars	North American Summer Amphitheatre Tour 2017	Presented by 101X
17.06.2017	Chicago, The Doobie Brothers		2017 North American Summer Tour	
23.06.2017	Future	Young Thug, Tory Lane, A$AP Ferg, Zoey Dollaz	Nobody Safe Tour	
28.06.2017	Deftones, Rise Against	Thrice, Frank Iero and the Patience	2017 North American Summer Tour	
04.07.2017	Willie Nelson	Sheryl Crow, Kacey Musgraves, Jamey Johnson, Steve Earle & The Dukes, Margo Price, Asleep at the Wheel, The Turnpike Troubadours, Hayes Carll, Ray Wylie Hubbard, Johnny Bush, Billy Joe Shaver, David Allan Coe, Lukas Nelson & Promise Of The Real, Insects vs Robots, Raelyn Nelson Band, Folk Uke	Willie Nelson's 4th of July Picnic	
20.07.2017	Logic	Joey Badass, Big Lenbo	Everybody's Tour	
05.08.2017	Incubus	Jimmy Eat World, Judah and the Lion	8 Tour	
20.08.2017	Foreigner	Cheap Trick, Jason Bonham's Led Zeppelin Experience	40th Anniversary Tour	
08.09.2017	Green Day	Catfish and the Bottlemen	Revolution Radio Tour	Presented by 101X
09.09.2017	Sturgill Simpson	Fantastic Negrito	2017 North American Tour	
17.09.2017	Zac Brown Band	Darrell Scott, Caroline Jones	Welcome Home Tour 2017	
20.09.2017	Depeche Mode	Warpaint	Global Spirit Tour	
21.09.2017	Luke Bryan	Brett Eldredge, Granger Smith	Huntin', Fishin' & Lovin' Everyday Tour	
30.09.2017	Ms. Lauryn Hill, Nas	Chronixx, Nick Grant	2017 North American Tour	
26.10.2017	Chris Stapleton	Marty Stuart, Brent Cobb	Chris Stapleton's All-American Road Show Tour	
31.10.2017	LCD Soundsystem	Big Freedia	American Dream Tour	
04.11.2017	MARIACHI USA		1st Annual MARIACHI USA Texas	
18.04.2018	Foo Fighters	The Struts	Concrete and Gold Tour	
24.04.2018	Queens of the Stone Age	Wolf Alice	Villains World Tour	
25.04.2018	Jack Johnson	Fruition	All the Light Above It Too World Tour	
28.04.2018	Eric Church	Steve Earle, The Dukes, The Texas Gentlemen	Holdin' My Own Tour	
02.05.2018	Jack White		2018 North American Tour	
11.05.2018	Mastodon, Primus	All Them Witches	North American Summer Tour	
16.05.2018	Kenny Chesney	Old Dominion	Trip Around the Sun Tour	
18.05.2018	Top Dawg Entertainment	Kendrick Lamar, SZA, ScHoolboy Q, Jay Rock, Ab-Soul, Sir, Lance Skiiiwalker	The Championship Tour	
22.05.2018	Dave Matthews Band		North American Summer Tour 2018	
27.05.2018	Steely Dan, The Doobie Brothers		The Summer Of Living Dangerously Tour	
09.06.2018	Ray LaMontagne	Neko Case	North American Tour	
16.06.2018	Post Malone	21 Savage, SOB x RBE	Beerbongs & Bentleys Tour	
20.06.2018	Slayer	Lamb of God, Anthrax, Behemoth, Testament	Slayer Farewell Tour	
22.06.2018	Kesha, Macklemore	Wes Period	The Adventures of Kesha and Macklemore	
29.06.2018	Chris Brown		Heartbreak on a Full Moon Tour	
30.06.2018	Weezer, Pixies	The Wombats	Weezer & Pixies Tour	
01.07.2018	Chicago, REO Speedwagon		North American Summer Tour 2018	
04.07.2018	Willie Nelson		Willie Nelson's 4th of July Picnic	Presented by Budweiser
07.07.2018	Thirty Seconds to Mars	Walk the Moon	Monolith Tour	Presented by 101X
11.07.2018	Janet Jackson		State of the World Tour	
21.07.2018	Counting Crows	+LIVE+	25 Years and Counting Tour	
27.07.2018	Logic	NF, Kyle	The Bobby Tarantino vs. Everybody Tour	Presented by 102.3 The Beat
28.07.2018	Pentatonix	Echosmith, Calum Scott	PTX Summer Tour 2018	
31.07.2018	Phish		North American Summer Tour 2018	
01.08.2018	Five Finger Death Punch	Breaking Benjamin	The US Fall Arena Tour	
02.08.2018	Imagine Dragons	Grace VanderWaal	Evolve World Tour	
03.08.2018	Coheed and Cambria, Taking Back Sunday	The Story So Far	North American Summer Tour	
04.08.2018	311, The Offspring	Gym Class Heroes	Never-Ending Summer Tour	
09.08.2018	G-Eazy, Lil Uzi Vert	Ty Dolla $ign, YBN Nahmir, P-Lo	The Endless Summer Tour	
17.08.2018	Rob Zombie, Marilyn Manson	Deadly Apples	Twins of Evil: The Second Coming Tour	
25.08.2018	Wiz Khalifa, Rae Sremmurd		Dazed & Blazed Tour	
20.09.2018	Dierks Bentley	Brothers Osborne, LANCO	Mountain High Tour	
25.10.2018	A Perfect Circle	Tricky, Night Club	2018 World Tour	
23.03.2019	MUSE		IndyCar Classic	
05.05.2019	The 1975	Pale Waves, No Rome	Music for Cars Tour	Originally scheduled for May 3 but was postponed for rain.
19.05.2019	ZZ Top, Bad Company	Cheap Trick	ZZ Top's 50th Anniversary Texas Bash	
13.06.2019	Hootie & The Blowfish	Barenaked Ladies	Group Therapy Tour	
22.06.2019	The Used, Thrice, Circa Survive The Story So Far, Andy Black, Sleeping with Sirens, Four Year Strong, Memphis May Fire, Trophy Eyes, Juliet Simms, Hyro the Hero		Rockstar Energy Drink DISRUPT FESTIVAL	Live Nation and SGE Present
23.06.2019	ODESZA	ZHU, Gryffin, Chelsea Cutler, Robotaki	Camp Nowhere 2019	
02.07.2019	Coheed and Cambria, Mastodon	Every Time I Die	The Unheavenly Skye Tour	
04.07.2019	Willie Nelson	Luke Combs	Willie Nelson's 4th of July Picnic	Presented by Budweiser
09.07.2019	Santana	The Doobie Brothers	Supernatural Now Tour	
18.07.2019	Korn, Alice In Chains	Underoath, Ho99o9	The North American Tour	
26.07.2019	Beck, Cage the Elephant	Spoons, Wild Belle	The Night Running Tour	
01.08.2019	Blink-182, Lil Wayne	Neck Deep	Blink-182 and Lil Wayne Tour	
03.08.2019	Mary J. Blige, Nas		The Royalty Tour	
07.08.2019	311, Dirty Heads	Dreamers, Bikini Trill	The North American Tour	Presented by 101X
22.08.2019	Nelly, TLC, Flo Rida		NORTH AMERICAN SUMMER AMPHITHEATER TOUR	
06.09.2019	Slipknot, Volbeat, Gojira, Behemoth		Knotfest Roadshow	
09.09.2019	Breaking Benjamin	Chevelle, Three Days Grace, Dorothy, Diamante	North American Tour	
10.09.2019	The National	Alvvays	2019 World Tour	
18.09.2019	CAKE, Ben Folds	Tall Heights	North American Summer Tour	
27.09.2019	Meek Mill, Future, YG, Mustard, Megan thee Stallion		The Legendary Nights Tour	
19.10.2019	Bastille	Joywave	Doom Days Tour Part 1	Presented by 101X & Austin City Limits
03.11.2019	Kool & The Gang		The 2019 Emirates Formula 1 USGP	
09.11.2019	Daddy Yankee, Kygo, 88Glam, DaBaby, Tiësto		TJH Celebration	Thomas J. Henry presents Austin Elevates
29.04.2020	The 1975	Phoebe Bridgers, Beabadoobee	Music for Cars Tour	Cancelled due to the COVID-19 pandemic
30.04.2020	The Avett Brothers, Violent Femmes		North American Tour	Cancelled due to the COVID-19 pandemic
09.05.2020	The Strokes		The New Abnormal Tour	Cancelled due to the COVID-19 pandemic
07.06.2020	Maroon 5, Meghan Trainor	Blackbear	MMXXI Tour	Cancelled due to the COVID-19 pandemic
12.06.2020	Alanis Morissette	Garbage, Liz Phair	‘Jagged Little Pill’ 25th Anniversary Tour	Cancelled due to the COVID-19 pandemic
14.06.2020	Sugarland	Mary Chapin Carpenter, Tenille Townes	There Goes The Neighborhood Tour	Cancelled due to the COVID-19 pandemic
20.06.2020	Daryl Hall & John Oates	Squeeze, KT Tunstall	North America Summer Tour	Cancelled due to the COVID-19 pandemic
21.06.2020	Bassnectar, REZZ, Jai Wolf, Said The Sky, Dabin (DJ), William Black		Camp Nowhere Texas 2020	Cancelled due to the COVID-19 pandemic
23.06.2020	Slipknot, A Day to Remember, Underoath, Code Orange		Knotfest Roadshow	Cancelled due to the COVID-19 pandemic
16.07.2020	Megadeth, Lamb of God	Trivium, In Flames	The Metal Tour of the Year	July 16, 2020 rescheduled date
17.07.2020	The Black Crowes	Dirty Honey	Shake Your Money Maker Tour	Cancelled due to the COVID-19 pandemic
19.07.2020	The Black Keys	Gary Clark Jr.	Let's Rock Tour	Cancelled due to the COVID-19 pandemic
29.07.2020	Incubus	311, Badflower	North American Summer Tour	Cancelled due to the COVID-19 pandemic
06.08.2020	Tim McGraw	Midland, Ingrid Andress	Here on Earth Tour	Cancelled due to the COVID-19 pandemic
11.08.2020	Breaking Benjamin	Bush, Theory of a Deadman, Saint Asonia, Cory Marks	North American Summer Tour	Cancelled due to the COVID-19 pandemic
16.08.2020	RÜFÜS DU SOL	Crooked Colours	Americas Tour 2020	Cancelled due to the COVID-19 pandemic
22.08.2020	Korn, Faith No More	Scars On Broadway, Spotlights	North American Summer Tour 2020	Cancelled due to the COVID-19 pandemic
13.09.2020	Foreigner	Kansas, Europe	Juke Box Heroes 2020	Cancelled due to the COVID-19 pandemic
01.10.2020	Kiss		End of the Road World Tour	Cancelled due to the COVID-19 pandemic
20.03.2021	Paul Oakenfold		AG Rugby AfterParty	
12.08.2021	Alanis Morissette	Garbage, Liz Phair	‘Jagged Little Pill’ 25th Anniversary Tour	June 12, 2020 rescheduled date
15.08.2021	The Black Crowes	Dirty Honey	Shake Your Money Maker Tour	July 17, 2020 rescheduled date
20.08.2021	Megadeth, Lamb of God	Trivium, In Flames	The Metal Tour of the Year	July 16, 2020 rescheduled date
21.08.2021	Chris Tomlin, Kari Jobe, Bethel Music	Cody Carnes, Jonathan & Melissa Helser, Dante Bowe, and Brandon Lake	Live In Concert	
22.08.2021	Willie Nelson & Family, Chris Stapleton, Ryan Bingham, Yola		Outlaw Music Festival 2021	
04.09.2021	Coheed And Cambria, The Used	Meet Me at the Altar	The North American Tour	
05.09.2021	Future, The Kid Laroi		JMBLYA 2021 Festival	Cancelled due to the COVID-19 pandemic
12.09.2021	Pitbull, Iggy Azalea		I Feel Good Tour	
15.09.2021	Kings of Leon	Cold War Kids	When You See Yourself Tour	
17.09.2021	Lil Baby	Lil Durk	The Back Outside Tour	
18.09.2021	Korn	Staind, Fire from the Gods	The North American Summer Tour	
27.09.2021	Maroon 5, Meghan Trainor	Blackbear	MMXXI Tour	June 7, 2020 rescheduled date
29.09.2021	Kiss		End of the Road World Tour	October 1, 2020 rescheduled date
16.10.2021	NF		CLOUDS TOUR	
28.10.2021	Slipknot, Killswitch Engage, Fever 333, Code Orange		Knotfest Roadshow	
07.11.2021	Tame Impala	Sudan Archives	The Slow Rush Tour	COVID-19 Restrictions forced Tame Impala to change venue from Frank Erwin Center as Walk the Moon are scheduled to play at Stubb's Waller Creek Amphitheater, that same date. Tame Impala didn't agree with not having mask mandates in the Frank Erwin Center citing that it is dangerous because the risk of having COVID-19 would be high.
12.03.2022	Alt-J, Portugal. The Man	Sir Chloe	The North American Tour	
26.03.2022	Hairball		Texas Grand Prix	AfterParty at the Amp
02.04.2022	Diana Ross	Jordan Matthew Young	ACGC Family Fest	
29.04.2022	AJR	GAYLE	The OK Orchestra Tour	
20.05.2022	Rex Orange County		The Who Cares? Tour	
10.06.2022	Evan Giia, FLETCHER, Porter Robinson, Lane 8, Nora En Pure, LP Giobbi, Moore Kismet		Camp Nowhere Texas 2022	
13.06.2022	Backstreet Boys		DNA World Tour	
19.07.2022	Train	Blues Traveler, Jewel, Thunderstorm Artis	AM Gold Tour	
22.07.2022	REO Speedwagon, Styx	Loverboy	Live & UnZoomed Tour	
30.07.2022	Third Eye Blind, Taking Back Sunday	Hockey Dad	Summer Gods Tour	
05.08.2022	Wiz Khalifa, Logic	24kGoldn, DJ Drama, FEDD THE GOD, C Dot Castro	Vinyl Verse Tour	
11.08.2022	Hillsong UNITED, Lauren Daigle, TAYA, Benjamin Hastings, Ryan Ellis		All This Future Summer Festival	
13.08.2022	Why Don't We	The Aces, JVKE	The Good Times Only Tour	
18.08.2022	Rob Zombie	Mudvayne, Static-X, Powerman 5000	#FreaksonParade Tour	
19.08.2022	ODESZA	Sylvan Esso, San Holo, Gilligan Moss	The Last Goodbye Tour	
20.08.2022	Incubus	Sublime with Rome, The Aquadolls	Summer Tour	
25.08.2022	OneRepublic	NEEDTOBREATHE	Never Ending Summer Tour	
26.08.2022	$uicideboy$	Ski Mask the Slump God, Maxo Kream, $NOT, DJ Scheme	Grey Day Tour	
27.08.2022	Jack Johnson	Ziggy Marley	Jack Johnson Summer Tour 2022	
28.08.2022	Kidz Bop		Kidz Bop Tour 2022	
31.08.2022	LANY, Surfaces		Summer Forever Tour	
01.09.2022	Five Finger Death Punch	Megadeth, The HU, Fire from the Gods	Afterlife Tour	
14.09.2022	Alice in Chains	Breaking Benjamin, Bush	American Tour 2022	
22.09.2022	RÜFÜS DU SOL	Paraleven	SURRENDERTOUR	
23.09.2022	ZZ Top, Jeff Beck	Ann Wilson	Raw Whiskey Tour	
24.09.2022	Khruangbin, Thundercat	Genesis Owusu	Space Walk Tour	
25.09.2022	Wu-Tang Clan, Nas		N.Y State of Mind Tour '22	
27.09.2022	Slipknot, Ice Nine Kills, Crown the Empire		Knotfest Roadshow	
23.10.2022	Interpol		Formula 1 Aramco United States Grand Prix 2022	American Soundtrack 2022
07.05.2023	Steve Miller Band	Cheap Trick, Christone "Kingfish" Ingram	US Tour 2023	
20.05.2023	Josh Hayes, Big Pokey, Sir Charles Jones, Calvin Richardson, King George, Adrian Bagher		Southern Soul Extravaganza	
08.06.2023	Weezer	Modest Mouse, Momma	Indie Rock Roadtrip!	
18.06.2023	Garbage, Noel Gallagher's High Flying Birds	Metric	Garbage & Noel Gallagher's High Flying Birds: Live in Concert	
12.07.2023	Peso Pluma		Doble P Tour	
22.07.2023	Slightly Stoopid, Sublime with Rome	Atmosphere, The Movement	Summertime 2023	
26.07.2023	Taking Back Sunday, The Maine, PVRIS, Mom Jeans, Hot Mulligan, Stand Atlantic	Andrew McMahon in the Wilderness, Cliffdiver	Sad Summer Festival 2023	
28.07.2023	Young the Giant, Milky Chance	Rosa Linn	2023 Summer Tour	
29.07.2023	Eric Church	Midland, Ray Wylie Hubbard	The Outsiders Revival Tour	
11.08.2023	The Offspring	Sum 41, Simple Plan	Let the Bad Times Roll Tour	
12.08.2023	Boy George, Culture Club	Howard Jones, Berlin	The Letting It Go Show Tour	
18.08.2023	Snoop Dogg, Wiz Khalifa	Too $hort, Warren G, Berner, DJ Drama	High School Reunion Tour	
20.08.2023	Pantera	Lamb of God	Pantera Tour	
31.08.2023	Godsmack, Staind		2023 TOUR	
03.09.2023	Ghost	Amon Amarth	RE-IMPERATOUR USA 2023	
15.09.2023	Tenacious D	Dave Hill	The Spicy Meatball Tour	
17.09.2023	Lana Del Rey	Nikki Lane	Did You Know That There's a Tunnel Under Ocean Blvd Tour	
21.09.2023	Jelly Roll	Ashley McBryde, Struggle Jennings	Backroad Baptism Tour	
30.09.2023	The Postal Service, Death Cab for Cutie	The Beths	Give Up & Transatlanticism 20th Anniversary Tour	
13.10.2023	Avenged Sevenfold	Falling in Reverse, Kim Dracula	Life Is but a Dream... Tour	
22.10.2023	Tiësto		Formula 1 Lenovo United States Grand Prix 2023	Presented by ESPN
01.05.2024	Neil Young, Crazy House		Love Earth Tour	Postponed due to weather.
14.05.2024	21 Savage	JID, Nardo Wick, 21 Lil Harold	American Dream Tour	
26.05.2024	Neil Young, Crazy House		Love Earth Tour	Postponed due to weather.
26.06.2024	Pixies, Modest Mouse	Cat Power	2024 North American Tour	
29.06.2024	charlieonnafriday, The War and Treaty, Paul Cauthen, Marcus King, Kelsea Ballerini		Coke Studio Sips & Sounds Summer Festival 2024	
30.06.2024	Josiah and The Bonnevilles, Tanner Usrey, Charles Wesley Godwin, Maren Morris, Jon Pardi		Coke Studio Sips & Sounds Summer Festival 2024	
12.07.2024	New Kids On The Block	Paula Abdul, DJ Jazzy Jeff	The Magic Summer Tour	
20.07.2024	Lamb of God, Mastodon	Malevolence, Kerry King	Ashes of Leviathan Tour	
02.08.2024	Third Eye Blind	Yellowcard, A R I Z O N A	Summer Gods Tour 2024	
21.08.2024	Megadeth	Mudvayne, All That Remains	Destroy All Enemies	
29.08.2024	Slightly Stoopid, Dirty Heads	HIRIE, The Expendables, KBong, Johnny Cosmic	Slightly Dirty Summer Tour 2024	
30.08.2024	Thirty Seconds to Mars	AFI, Poppy, KennyHoopla	Seasons Tour	
07.09.2024	Lil Wayne, The Kid Laroi, Jessie Murph, Anella Herim, Preston Wayne		Float Fest	
10.09.2024	Green Day	Rancid, The Linda Lindas	The Saviors Tour	
13.09.2024	Neil Young, Crazy House		Love Earth Tour	
14.09.2024	Rob Zombie, Alice Cooper	Ministry, Filter	Freaks on Parade 2024	
15.09.2024	The Marley Brothers		The Legacy Tour 2024	
18.09.2024	Five Finger Death Punch, Marilyn Manson	Slaughter to Prevail	5FDP TOUR 2024	
27.09.2024	Kidz Bop		Kidz Bop Tour 2024	
28.09.2024	Kygo	Zara Larsson	KYGO World Tour	
20.10.2024	Two Friends		2024 Formula 1 Pirelli Grand Prix	
24.10.2024	Judas Priest	Sabaton	Invincible Shield Tour North America 2024	
25.10.2024	Breaking Benjamin, Staind	Daughtry, Lakeview	2024 Tour	
26.10.2024	Post Malone, The Fools For You	Muscadine Bloodline, Dan Spencer	F-1 Trillion Tour	
27.10.2024	Post Malone, The Fools For You	Muscadine Bloodline, Dan Spencer	F-1 Trillion Tour	
15.11.2024	King Gizzard & the Lizard Wizard	King Stingray	USA 2024 Marathon Shows Tour	
04.06.2025	Styx, Kevin Cronin	Don Felder	Brotherhood of Rock	
27.06.2025	I Prevail, Parkway Drive, Killswitch Engage, Beartooth	The Amity Affliction, The Devil Wears Prada, Alpha Wolf, TX2	Summer of Loud 2025	
29.06.2025	Stick Figure, Stephen Marley	The Hip Abduction	Island Holiday Summer Tour 2025	
04.07.2025	Willie Nelson & Family	Bob Dylan, The Avett Brothers, The Mavericks, Asleep at the Wheel, Tami Neilson	Willie Nelson's 4th of July Picnic	
29.07.2025	Wiz Khalifa, Dom Kennedy, Earl Sweatshirt, Curren$y, Ab-Soul	Chevy Woods, Fedd the God, DJ Bonics	Good Vibes Only Tour	Part #2 SmokersEdition
30.07.2025	Russ	Big Sean, Sabrina Claudio	Into The Wild Tour 2025	
16.08.2025	+Live+, Collective Soul	Our Lady Peace, Greylin James Rue	Summer Unity Tour	
24.08.2025	The Offspring	Jimmy Eat World, New Found Glory	Supercharged Worldwide in 25	
02.09.2025	Pantera	Amon Amarth	The Heaviest Tour of the Summer	
16.09.2025	Lil Wayne	Tyga, Belly Gang Kushington	Tha Carter VI North America Tour	
19.09.2025	Above and Beyond	Qrion, Spencer Brown, Rezident	The ‘Bigger Than All Of Us’ Tour	
22.09.2025	$uicideboy$	Bones, Night Lovell, Germ, Chetta	Grey Day Tour	
26.09.2025	Quinn XCII	Goth Babe	Look! I’m Alive Tour	
27.09.2025	Kidz Bop		Kidz Bop Live Certified Bop Tour	Cancelled
27.09.2025	Bone Thugs-N-Harmony	Three 6 Mafia, TECH N9NE, DJ Quik	Thugging Ruggish Mafia Tour	
25.10.2025	Alice Cooper, Judas Priest	Corrosion of Conformity	Summer/Fall 2025 North American Tour	
31.10.2025	Dom Dolla		This Is Something I'm Doing Tour	
01.11.2025	The B-52's, DEVO	Lene Lovich	Cosmic De-Evolution Tour	

== Germania Insurance Super Stage ==
Germania Insurance Super Stage at night with a performance

The Germania Insurance Super Stage is a temporary stage used for concerts that exceed the 14,000 capacity of the Germania Insurance Amphitheater. The Super Stage is mainly used for the F1 Concerts and the big acts. It is located in the infield of Circuit of the Americas between Turn 11 and Turn 12. ESPN built the Super Stage for the X Games Austin 2015.

== Performances at the Super Stage ==
The Super Stage has seen performances by notable acts like Metallica, Elton John, The Rolling Stones and Taylor Swift.

List of Performers at the Germania Insurance Super Stage
Date	Headliner	Opening acts	Event	Additional information
05.05.2015	Nicki Minaj		X Games Austin 2015	The Pinkprint Tour
06.05.2015	Metallica		X Games Austin 2015	Lords of Summer Tour
25.10.2015	Elton John		2015 Formula 1 United States Grand Prix	
04.06.2016	blink-182	All Time Low	X Games Austin 2016	We Are Pirates Tour
22.10.2016	Taylor Swift		2016 Formula 1 United States Grand Prix	
23.10.2016	Usher		2016 Formula 1 United States Grand Prix	
23.10.2016	The Roots		2016 Formula 1 United States Grand Prix	
21.10.2017	Justin Timberlake		2017 Formula 1 United States Grand Prix	
21.10.2017	The Shadowboxers		2017 Formula 1 United States Grand Prix	
10.22.2017	Stevie Wonder		2017 Formula 1 United States Grand Prix	
20.10.2018	Bruno Mars		2018 Formula 1 United States Grand Prix	
21.10.2018	Britney Spears		2018 Formula 1 United States Grand Prix	Spears final live performance as of 2026
01.11.2019	Imagine Dragons		2019 Formula 1 United States Grand Prix	
02.11.2019	P!nk		2019 Formula 1 United States Grand Prix	
24.05.2020	The Rolling Stones	Ghost Hounds	No Filter Tour	Cancelled due to the COVID-19 pandemic
22.10.2021	Twenty One Pilots		2021 Formula 1 United States Grand Prix	
23.10.2021	Billy Joel		2021 Formula 1 United States Grand Prix	
20.11.2021	The Rolling Stones	Ghost Hounds	No Filter Tour	
21.10.2022	Green Day		2022 Formula 1 United States Grand Prix	
22.10.2022	Ed Sheeran		2022 Formula 1 United States Grand Prix	
20.10.2023	The Killers		2023 Formula 1 United States Grand Prix	
21.10.2023	Queen + Adam Lambert		2023 Formula 1 United States Grand Prix	The Rhapsody Tour
18.10.2024	Sting		2024 Formula 1 United States Grand Prix	
19.10.2024	Eminem		2024 Formula 1 United States Grand Prix	
17.10.2025	KYGO		2025 Formula 1 United States Grand Prix	
18.10.2025	Garth Brooks		2025 Formula 1 United States Grand Prix	
19.10.2025	Turnpike Troubadours		2025 Formula 1 United States Grand Prix	

== See also ==
- Circuit of the Americas
- List of contemporary amphitheatres
- List of music venues
- Live Nation
