= The Spicy Meatball Tour =

2023–24 concert tour by Tenacious D

- World tour by Tenacious D
- Location: Europe; North America; Oceania
- Start date: May 6, 2023
- End date: July 14, 2024
- Legs: 5
- No. of shows: 43

Tenacious D concert chronology
- Post-Apocalypto Tour (2018–20); The Spicy Meatball Tour (2023–24)

The Spicy Meatball Tour was a concert tour by American comedy rock band Tenacious D The tour began on May 6, 2023 and ended on July 14, 2024 with the band playing in the United States, Europe and Australia. Whilst the tour was not supporting the release of a new studio album, it was supporting the song and music video, "Video Games", released in May 2023.

In July 2024, the tour was cut short following a comment made by Kyle Gass in Sydney regarding the attempted assassination of Donald Trump, which sparked international controversy on social media.

== History ==
The set list consisted of music from the band's first three albums (Tenacious D, The Pick of Destiny, Rize of the Fenix). Music from their fourth album, Post-Apocalypto, was not performed on the tour.

A new Tenacious D song, "Video Games", premiered online, on May 11, 2023 with a music video directed by Adam Paloian and his production company Pinreel Inc., which was the band's first new music video since 2012.

On June 1, 2023, the band released a music video for their cover version of Chris Isaak's "Wicked Game", a song the band started performing on this tour. The band had a yearly tradition of releasing the cover of a song every year.

The band also released a coloring book, titled "Tenacious D: The Official Coloring Book" while on this tour. Limited edition signed copies of the book were available on each stop of the second leg, starting with the show in Charlotte, North Carolina.

In February 2024, the band announced their first tour of Australia and New Zealand in eleven years, to be held in July 2024.

In May 2024, the band re-issued Rize of the Fenix on vinyl whilst on tour.

== Opening acts ==
Musician Steel Beans and acoustic duo Wynchester (featuring Tenacious D's John Konesky), opened for specific nights of the first leg of the tour. For the fall U.S. dates, comedian Dave Hill opened for the band. For the European dates on the fourth leg, Crusade (also featuring Konesky) and Dave Hill supported on different nights with Crusade supporting in Sydney.

== Average set list ==
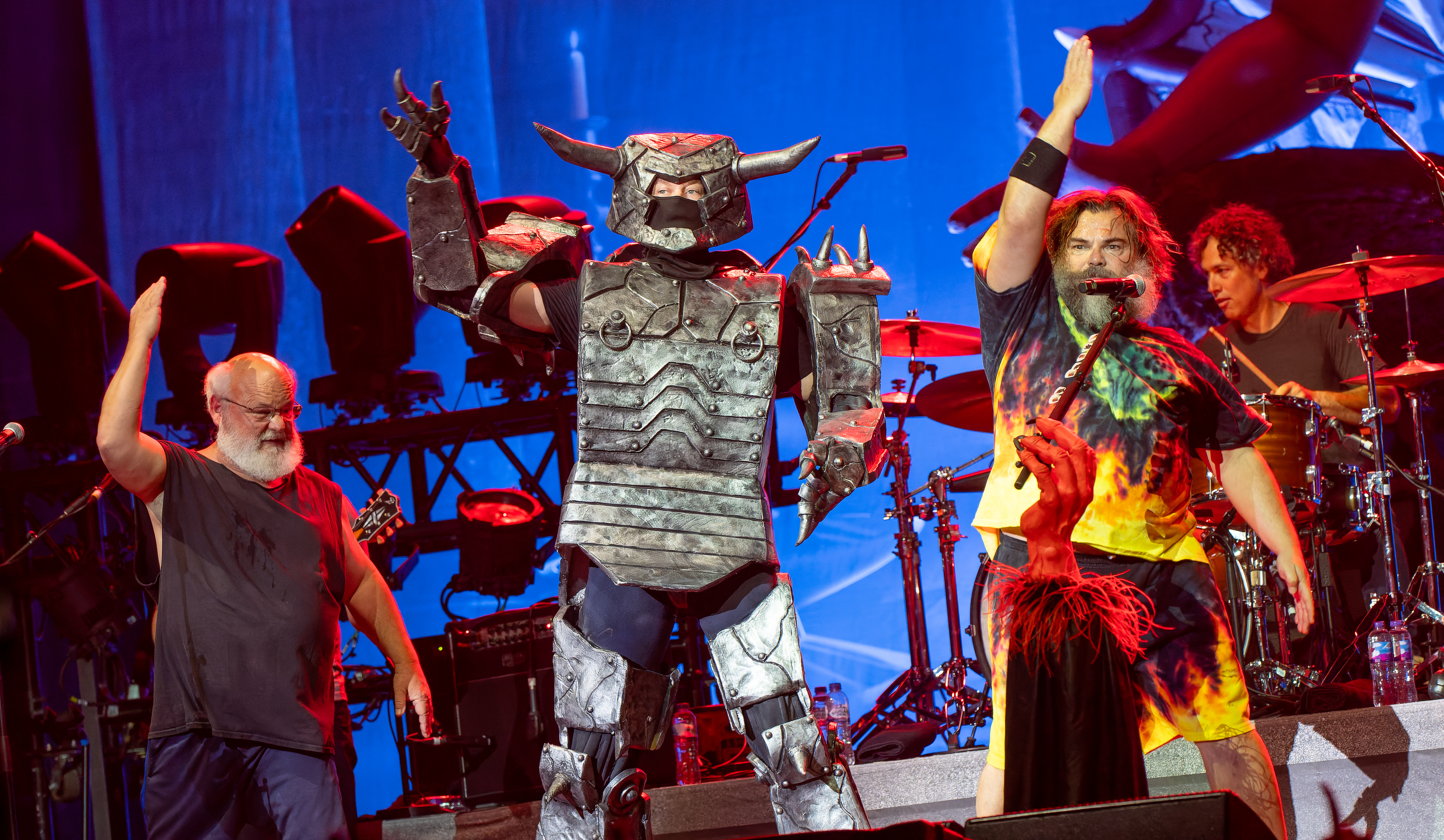
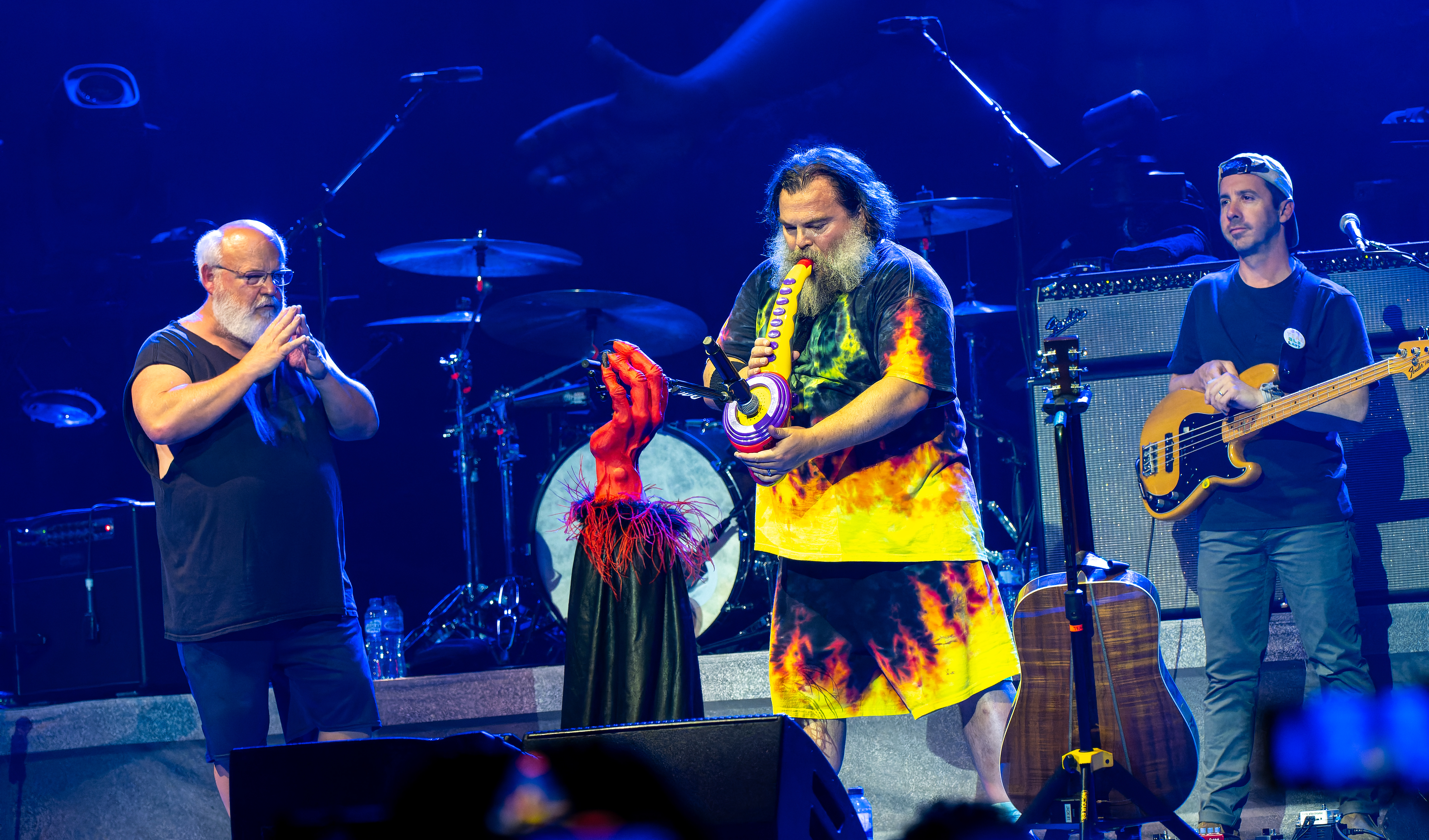
Jack Black and Kyle Gass performing during The Spicy Meatball Tour in London, England on June 16, 2023.

The following set list is from the first concert of the second leg, in Charlotte, North Carolina. It is not intended to represent all shows of the tour.

1. "Kickapoo"
2. "Low Hangin' Fruit
3. "Rize of the Fenix"
4. "Wonderboy"
5. "Tribute"
6. "Video Games"
7. "The Metal" (with "The Metal" costume)
8. "Sax-a-Boom" (performed by Black)
9. "Roadie"
10. "Dude (I Totally Miss You)"
11. "Wicked Game" (Chris Isaak cover)
12. Beelzeboss (The Final Showdown)"
13. Double Team (including a Black covering a song, as a vocal solo)
  Encore
14. "Master Exploder"
15. "The Spicy Meatball Song"
16. "Fuck Her Gently"

=== Jack Black solo song ===
Jack Black had a solo set on the majority of the tour dates, towards the end of the show, after the band introduction, where he performed a snippet of a song, which was a cover version with a Tenacious D twist to it.

- May 8 & May 9, 2023 – Chesterfield, Missouri & Kansas City, Missouri: "War Pigs" by Black Sabbath
- May 11, 2023 – New Orleans, Louisiana: "What a Wonderful World" by Louis Armstrong
- May 13, 2023 – Saint Augustine, Florida: "Free Bird" by Lynyrd Skynyrd
- June 6, 2023 – Hamburg, Germany: "Let It Go" by Idina Menzel
- June 10, 13, 14, 2023 – Milan, Italy; Brussels, Belgium & Rotterdam. Netherlands: "Seven Nation Army" by The White Stripes
- June 16, 2023 – London, England: "Take A Chance On Me" by ABBA & "War Pigs" by Black Sabbath
- September 6, 2023 – Charlotte, North Carolina: "Carolina in My Mind" by James Taylor
- September 7, 2023 – Franklin, Tennessee: "Jolene" by Dolly Parton
- September 11, 2023 – Rogers, Arkansas: "Wichita Lineman" by Jimmy Webb
- September 13, 2023 – Houston, Texas: "La Grange" by ZZ Top
- July 13, 2024 – Sydney, New South Wales: "Overkill" by Men at Work
- July 14, 2024 - Sydney, New South Wales: "Highway To Hell" by AC/DC

== Tour dates ==
Date	City	Country	Venue	Opening act
Leg 1 – North America #1
May 6, 2023	Atlanta	United States	Shaky Knees	—N/a
May 8, 2023	Chesterfield	United States	The Factory	Steel Beans
May 9, 2023	Kansas City	United States	Starlight Theatre	Steel Beans
May 11, 2023	New Orleans	United States	The Fillmore	Steel Beans
May 13, 2023	Saint Augustine	United States	St. Augustine Amphitheatre	Wynchester
Leg 2 – Europe #1
June 2, 2023	Nuremberg	Germany	Rock im Park	—N/a
June 3, 2023	Nürburgring	Germany	Rock am Ring	—N/a
June 4, 2023	Prague	Czech Republic	Forum Karlin	Steel Beans
June 6, 2023	Hamburg	Germany	Sporthalle Hamburg	Steel Beans
June 7, 2023	Berlin	Germany	Citadel Music Festival	Steel Beans
June 8, 2023	Nickelsdorf	Austria	Nova Rock Festival	—N/a
June 10, 2023	Milan	Italy	Carroponte	Steel Beans
June 12, 2023	Zürich	Switzerland	Samsung Hall	Steel Beans
June 13, 2023	Brussels	Belgium	Forest National	Steel Beans
June 14, 2023	Rotterdam	Netherlands	Rotterdam Ahoy	Steel Beans
June 16, 2023	London	England	The O2 Arena	Steel Beans
June 18, 2023	Clisson	France	Hellfest	—N/a
Leg 3 – North America #2
September 6, 2023	Charlotte	United States	PNC Music Pavilion	Dave Hill
September 7, 2023	Franklin	United States	FirstBank Amphitheater	Dave Hill
September 9, 2023	Indianapolis	United States	All IN Music & Arts Festival	—N/a
September 11, 2023	Rogers	United States	Walmart AMP	Dave Hill
September 13, 2023	Houston	United States	White Oak Music Hall	Dave Hill
September 14, 2023	Grand Prairie	United States	Texas Trust CU Theatre at Grand Prairie	Dave Hill
September 15, 2023	Austin	United States	Germania Insurance Amphitheater	Dave Hill
Leg 4 – Europe #2
April 29, 2024	Stockholm	Sweden	Hovet	Crusade
April 30, 2024	Oslo	Norway	Spektrum	Crusade
May 1, 2024	Copenhagen	Denmark	Royal Arena	Crusade
May 3, 2024	Luxembourg	Luxembourg	Rockhal	Crusade
May 5, 2024	Dublin	Ireland	3Arena	Dave Hill
May 7, 2024	Birmingham	England	Resorts World Arena	Dave Hill
May 8, 2024	Manchester	England	Manchester Arena	Dave Hill
May 9, 2024	Glasgow	Scotland	OVO Hydro	Dave Hill
May 11, 2024	Leeds	England	First Direct Arena	Dave Hill
May 12, 2024	Nottingham	England	Motorpoint Arena	Dave Hill
May 13, 2024	Brighton	England	Brighton Centre	Dave Hill
May 15, 2024	Paris	France	Accor Arena	Crusade
Leg 5 – Australia
July 13, 2024	Sydney	Australia	International Convention Centre	Crusade
July 14, 2024	Sydney	Australia	International Convention Centre	Crusade

=== Cancelled shows ===
Date	City	Country	Venue	Notes
May 13, 2023	Live Oak	United States	Spirit of the Suwannee Music Park	Echoland Festival; The entire festival was canceled due to "unforeseen circumstances"
July 16, 2024	Newcastle	Australia	Entertainment Centre	Cancelled following controversy around Gass' comment regarding the attempted assassination of Donald Trump during the second Sydney show.
July 18, 2024	Brisbane	Australia	Entertainment Centre	Cancelled following controversy around Gass' comment regarding the attempted assassination of Donald Trump during the second Sydney show.
July 20, 2024	Melbourne	Australia	Rod Laver Arena	Cancelled following controversy around Gass' comment regarding the attempted assassination of Donald Trump during the second Sydney show.
July 22, 2024	Adelaide	Australia	Entertainment Centre	Cancelled following controversy around Gass' comment regarding the attempted assassination of Donald Trump during the second Sydney show.
July 24, 2024	Wellington	New Zealand	TSB Arena	Cancelled following controversy around Gass' comment regarding the attempted assassination of Donald Trump during the second Sydney show.
July 26, 2024	Auckland	New Zealand	Spark Arena	Cancelled following controversy around Gass' comment regarding the attempted assassination of Donald Trump during the second Sydney show.

=== Other shows ===
These shows occurred in the middle of The Spicy Meatball Tour but are not recognized as being part of the tour. They are extra performances that had a limited setlist.

List of other shows
Date	City	Country	Venue	Show
June 25, 2023	Los Angeles	United States	Hollywood Bowl	The Game Awards 10-Year Celebration; Tenacious D performed "Video Games"
October 14, 2023	Los Angeles	United States	Hollywood Palladium	Run the Jewels 10th Anniversary Tour; Tenacious D performed a DJ set as "Tenacious DJ"

== Personnel ==
- Jack Black – lead vocals, additional guitar
- Kyle Gass – lead guitar, additional vocals, flute
- John Konesky – electric guitar, additional vocals
- John Spiker – bass guitar, additional vocals
- Scott Seiver – drums
- Mike Bray – 'Biffy Pyro' character, additional vocals
