= Brand New/Modest Mouse Tour =

2016 concert tour by Brand New and Modest Mouse

- Tour by Brand New and Modest Mouse
- Start date: June 28, 2016
- End date: July 31, 2016
- Legs: 1
- No. of shows: 24

The Brand New/Modest Mouse Tour was a United States concert tour by American alternative rock bands Brand New and Modest Mouse. The tour lasted from June 2016 to July 2016.

== Setlist ==
The following setlist was obtained from the July 19, 2016 concert, held at the Ascend Amphitheater in Nashville. It does not represent all concerts for the duration of the tour.

Modest Mouse

1. The Ground Walks, With Time in a Box
2. Black Cadillacs
3. Never Ending Math Equation
4. Invisible
5. Dashboard
6. Dark Center of the Universe
7. Trailer Trash
8. Dramamine
9. Bukowski
10. This Devil's Workday
11. Shit in Your Cut
12. Tiny Cities Made of Ashes
13. Lampshades on Fire
14. Blame It on the Tetons
15. Fly Trapped in a Jar

Brand New

1. Sink
2. Gasoline
3. Millstone
4. Noro
5. Tautou
6. Sic Transit Gloria... Glory Fades
7. I Will Play My Game Beneath the Spin Light
8. Okay I Believe You, but My Tommy Gun Don't
9. The Quiet Things That No One Ever Knows
10. Degausser
11. I Am a Nightmare
12. Brothers
13. Limousine (MS Rebridge)
14. Jesus
15. Luca
16. Sowing Season

Encore:

1. Moshi Moshi
2. Play Crack the Sky (Jesse and Vin)
3. You Won't Know (Tautou breakdown)

== Tour dates ==
Date	City	Country	Venue
North America
June 28, 2016	Salt Lake City	United States	Saltair (Utah)
June 29, 2016	Morrison	United States	Red Rocks Amphitheatre
July 1, 2016	Bonner Springs	United States	Cricket Wireless Amphitheater
July 2, 2016	Chicago	United States	Huntington Bank Pavilion
July 3, 2016	Clarkston	United States	DTE Energy Music Theatre
July 5, 2016	Pittsburgh	United States	Stage AE
July 6, 2016	Cary	United States	Koka Booth Amphitheatre
July 8, 2016	Miami	United States	Bayfront Park Amphitheater
July 9, 2016	Tampa	United States	MidFlorida Credit Union Amphitheatre
July 10, 2016	Atlanta	United States	Chastain Park Amphitheater
July 12, 2016	Columbia	United States	Merriweather Post Pavilion
July 14, 2016	New York City	United States	Madison Square Garden
July 15, 2016	Mansfield	United States	Xfinity Center
July 16, 2016	Philadelphia	United States	Mann Center for the Performing Arts
July 19, 2016	Nashville	United States	Ascend Amphitheater
July 21, 2016	Tulsa	United States	BOK Center
July 22, 2016	Grand Prairie	United States	The Field at Verizon Theatre
July 23, 2016	Del Valle	United States	Austin360 Amphitheater
July 25, 2016	Phoenix	United States	Comerica Theatre
July 26, 2016	Chula Vista	United States	Mattress Firm Amphitheatre
July 27, 2016	Inglewood	United States	The Forum
July 28, 2016	Berkeley	United States	Hearst Greek Theatre
July 30, 2016	Seattle	United States	KeyArena
July 31, 2016	Portland	United States	Moda Center
