= Play That Song Tour =

2017 concert tour by Train

- Tour by Train
- Promotional poster for the tour
- Associated album: A Girl, a Bottle, a Boat
- Start date: May 12, 2017
- End date: October 25, 2017
- No. of shows: 46 in North America; 11 in Europe; 57 Total

Train concert chronology
- Picasso at the Wheel Tour (2015); Play That Song Tour (2017); 2021 Tour (2021)

The Play That Song Tour was a concert tour by American pop rock band Train. It was in support of the group's tenth studio album, A Girl, a Bottle, a Boat (2017). The tour began on May 12, 2017, in Las Vegas and finished on October 25, 2017, in Belfast, Northern Ireland. Train announced the tour in January 2017.

In a review of the Salt Lake City show, Scott Tittrington from the Daily Herald felt that Train "still has that "it" factor that makes it must-see viewing and listening when it takes the stage." In a review of the Fresno show, Rory Appleton from the Fresno Bee said that seeing Train "on stage is to watch a master class in the rock/pop performance."

== Opening acts ==
- O.A.R.
- Natasha Bedingfield

== Tour dates ==
| Date | City | Country | Venue | Attendance | Revenue |
North America
| May 12, 2017 | Las Vegas | United States | MGM Grand Garden Arena | —N/a | —N/a |
| May 13, 2017 | Los Angeles | United States | Hollywood Bowl | 10,991 / 17,606 | $786,705 |
| May 14, 2017 | Chula Vista | United States | Mattress Firm Amphitheatre | 6,015 / 11,413 | $190,214 |
| May 16, 2017 | Phoenix | United States | Ak-Chin Pavilion | 7,688 / 18,905 | $203,317 |
| May 17, 2017 | Albuquerque | United States | Sandia Resort and Casino | 4,113 / 4,242 | $256,101 |
| May 19, 2017 | The Woodlands | United States | Cynthia Woods Mitchell Pavilion | 7,814 / 15,853 | $230,682 |
| May 20, 2017 | Austin | United States | Austin360 Amphitheater | 5,411 / 6,966 | $183,820 |
| May 21, 2017 | Dallas | United States | Starplex Pavilion | 6,726 / 19,866 | $184,042 |
| May 22, 2017 | Rogers | United States | Walmart Arkansas Music Pavilion | 8,052 / 9,723 | $251,408 |
| May 24, 2017 | Pelham | United States | Oak Mountain Amphitheatre | 3,850 / 10,263 | $127,093 |
| May 26, 2017 | Tampa | United States | MidFlorida Credit Union Amphitheatre | 7,250 / 19,222 | $239,799 |
| May 27, 2017 | West Palm Beach | United States | Coral Sky Amphitheatre | 8,228 / 19,381 | $238,527 |
| May 28, 2017 | Jacksonville | United States | Daily's Place Amphitheater | 4,334 / 5,312 | $232,160 |
| May 30, 2017 | New Orleans | United States | Bold Sphere Music | 2,743 / 5,352 | $109,241 |
| May 31, 2017 | Nashville | United States | Ascend Amphitheater | 4,775 / 6,800 | $180,419 |
| June 2, 2017 | Atlanta | United States | Lakewood Amphitheatre | 8,069 / 18,900 | $186,627 |
| June 3, 2017 | Charlotte | United States | PNC Music Pavilion | 11,016 / 18,744 | $284,903 |
| June 4, 2017 | Raleigh | United States | Coastal Credit Union Music Park | 8,308 / 19,851 | $191,332 |
| June 6, 2017 | Virginia Beach | United States | Veterans United Home Loans Amphitheater | 6,545 / 20,055 | $152,639 |
| June 8, 2017 | Camden | United States | BB&T Pavilion | 8,119 / 24,841 | $213,510 |
| June 9, 2017 | Holmdel | United States | PNC Bank Arts Center | 13,932 / 16,570 | $432,914 |
| June 10, 2017 | Bristow | United States | Jiffy Lube Live | 13,012 / 22,583 | $365,123 |
| June 11, 2017 | Mansfield | United States | Xfinity Center | 9,442 / 13,843 | $305,175 |
| June 13, 2017 | Uncasville | United States | Mohegan Sun Arena | —N/a | —N/a |
| June 14, 2017 | Wantagh | United States | Jones Beach Theater | 11,472 / 13,727 | $458,889 |
| June 16, 2017 | Bethel | United States | Bethel Woods Center for the Arts | 6,869 / 16,918 | $203,183 |
| June 17, 2017 | Hershey | United States | Hersheypark Stadium | 10,693 / 17,736 | $299,513 |
| June 18, 2017 | Saratoga Springs | United States | Saratoga Performing Arts Center | 10,311 / 24,902 | $317,763 |
| June 20, 2017 | Darien | United States | Darien Lake PAC | —N/a | —N/a |
| June 21, 2017 | Toronto | Canada | Budweiser Stage | —N/a | —N/a |
| June 23, 2017 | Burgettstown | United States | KeyBank Pavilion | —N/a | —N/a |
| June 24, 2017 | Cuyahog Falls | United States | Blossom Music Center | 13,100 / 20,826 | $327,779 |
| June 25, 2017 | Clarkston | United States | DTE Energy Music Theatre | 13,408 / 14,962 | $386,287 |
| June 27, 2017 | Cincinnati | United States | Riverbend Music Center | —N/a | —N/a |
| June 29, 2017 | Noblesville | United States | Klipsch Music Center | —N/a | —N/a |
| June 30, 2017 | Tinley Park | United States | Hollywood Casino Amphitheatre | 14,110 / 14,416 | $369,592 |
| July 1, 2017 | Maryland Heights | United States | Hollywood Casino Amphitheatre | —N/a | —N/a |
| July 3, 2017 | Kansas City | United States | Starlight Theatre | —N/a | —N/a |
| July 4, 2017 | Greenwood Village | United States | Fiddler's Green Amphitheatre | —N/a | —N/a |
| July 6, 2017 | West Valley City | United States | USANA Amphitheatre | —N/a | —N/a |
| July 8, 2017 | Mountain View | United States | Shoreline Amphitheatre | —N/a | —N/a |
| July 9, 2017 | Stateline | United States | Lake Tahoe Outdoor Arena | —N/a | —N/a |
| July 11, 2017 | Fresno | United States | Save Mart Center | —N/a | —N/a |
| July 13, 2017 | Boise | United States | Taco Bell Arena | —N/a | —N/a |
| July 14, 2017 | Ridgefield | United States | Sunlight Supply Amphitheater | —N/a | —N/a |
| July 15, 2017 | George | United States | The Gorge Amphitheatre | —N/a | —N/a |
Europe
| October 12, 2017 | Munich | Germany | Technikum | —N/a | —N/a |
| October 13, 2017 | Cologne | Germany | Luxor | —N/a | —N/a |
| October 14, 2017 | Amsterdam | Netherlands | AFAS Live | —N/a | —N/a |
| October 16, 2017 | Sheffield | England | City Hall | —N/a | —N/a |
| October 17, 2017 | Newcastle | England | NX Newcastle | —N/a | —N/a |
| October 19, 2017 | Manchester | England | O_{2} Apollo Manchester | —N/a | —N/a |
| October 20, 2017 | Glasgow | Scotland | O_{2} Academy Glasgow | —N/a | —N/a |
| October 21, 2017 | Birmingham | England | O_{2} Academy Birmingham | —N/a | —N/a |
| October 23, 2017 | London | England | Eventim Apollo | —N/a | —N/a |
| October 24, 2017 | Dublin | Ireland | Vicar Street | —N/a | —N/a |
| October 25, 2017 | Belfast | Northern Ireland | Waterfront Hall | —N/a | —N/a |
| Total | | | | 246,396 / 449,778 | $7,908,757 |
