= World Domination Tour =

1999–2000 concert tour by Slipknot

- World tour by Slipknot
- Location: Asia; Australia; Europe; North America
- Associated album: Slipknot
- Start date: November 28, 1999
- End date: November 1, 2000

Slipknot concert chronology
- Livin la Vida Loco (1999); World Domination Tour (1999–2000); Tattoo the Earth (2000–2002)

The World Domination Tour was a worldwide concert tour in 1999 and 2000 headlined by Slipknot in support of their first studio album Slipknot. It was their first major headlining tour.

== Setlist ==
Typical setlist
1. "742617000027"
2. "(sic)"
3. "Eyeless"
4. "Wait and Bleed"
5. "Liberate"
6. "Purity"
7. "Prosthetics"
8. "Spit It Out"
9. "Surfacing"
10. "Get This"
11. "Scissors"
Note The following songs were played only occasionally – "Eeyore", "No Life", "Only One", "Me Inside".

== Tour dates ==
Date	City	Country	Venue	Other bands
North America
November 28, 1999	Lawrence	United States	Granada Theater	Biohazard, The Step Kings
November 29, 1999	Chicago	United States	House of Blues	Biohazard, Mudvayne, The Step Kings
November 30, 1999	Iowa City	United States	The Union Bar	Biohazard, Mudvayne, The Step Kings
December 1, 1999	Minneapolis	United States	The Quest	Biohazard, Mudvayne, The Step Kings
December 2, 1999	Milwaukee	United States	The Rave	Biohazard, Mudvayne, The Step Kings
December 3, 1999	Detroit	United States	Harpo's	Biohazard, Mudvayne, The Step Kings
December 4, 1999	Old Bridge	United States	Birch Hill Nightclub	Biohazard, Primer 55, The Deadlights
December 5, 1999	Philadelphia	United States	Electric Factory	Biohazard, Primer 55, The Deadlights
December 6, 1999	Hartford	United States	Webster Theater	Biohazard, Primer 55, The Deadlights
December 7, 1999	New York City	United States	The Roxy	Biohazard, Primer 55, The Deadlights
December 8, 1999	Boston	United States	Avalon	Biohazard, Primer 55, The Deadlights
Europe
December 13, 1999	London	United Kingdom	London Astoria	Kill II This
December 14, 1999	Amsterdam	Netherlands	Melkweg	Kill II This
December 15, 1999	Ghent	Belgium	Vooruit	Kill II This
December 16, 1999	Paris	France	Élysée Montmartre	Kill II This
December 16, 1999	Paris	France	Nulle Part Ailleurs	—N/a
December 17, 1999	Cologne	Germany	Kantine	Kill II This
December 19, 1999	Munich	Germany	Backstage	Kill II This
December 20, 1999	Hamburg	Germany	Logo	Kill II This
December 21, 1999	Copenhagen	Denmark	Little Vega	Kill II This
December 22, 1999	Stockholm	Sweden	Klubben Fryshuset	Kill II This
North America
January 1, 2000	Des Moines	United States	Super Toad Entertainment Centre	Mudvayne
January 7, 2000	Davenport	United States	The Col Ballroom	Kittie, Will Haven
January 8, 2000	Sauget	United States	Pop's	Kittie, Will Haven
January 9, 2000	Kansas City	United States	The Beaumont Club	Kittie, Will Haven
January 10, 2000	Springfield	United States	Juke Joint	Kittie, Will Haven
~~January 11, 2000~~	~~Oklahoma City~~	United States	~~Tower Theatre~~ CANCELLED	Kittie, Will Haven
January 14, 2000	Orlando	United States	House of Blues	Kittie, Will Haven
January 15, 2000	Tampa	United States	The Masquerade	Kittie, Will Haven
January 16, 2000	Fort Lauderdale	United States	Chili Pepper	Kittie, Will Haven
January 18, 2000	Atlanta	United States	The Masquerade	Kittie, Will Haven
January 19, 2000	Raleigh	United States	The Ritz	Kittie, Will Haven
January 20, 2000	Winston-Salem	United States	Ziggy's	Kittie, Will Haven
January 21, 2000	North Myrtle Beach	United States	House of Blues	Kittie, Will Haven
January 22, 2000	Norfolk	United States	The Boathouse	Kittie, Will Haven
January 23, 2000	Washington, D.C.	United States	9:30 Club	Kittie, Will Haven
January 25, 2000	Pittsburgh	United States	Metropol	Kittie, Will Haven
January 26, 2000	Grand Rapids	United States	Orbit Room	Kittie, Will Haven
~~January 27, 2000~~	~~London~~	~~Canada~~	~~The Drink~~ RESCHEDULED	Kittie, Will Haven
~~January 28, 2000~~	~~Toronto~~	~~Canada~~	~~The Warehouse~~ RESCHEDULED	Kittie, Will Haven
~~January 29, 2000~~	~~Montreal~~	~~Canada~~	~~Métropolis~~ RESCHEDULED	Kittie, Will Haven
Japan & Australia
February 4, 2000	Osaka	Japan	Big Cat	
February 6, 2000	Tokyo	Japan	Club Quattro	
February 7, 2000	Tokyo	Japan	Club Quattro	
February 10, 2000	Brisbane	Australia	Arena Club	
February 11, 2000	Sydney	Australia	Hordern Pavilion	
February 12, 2000	Melbourne	Australia	Festival Hall	
February 13, 2000	Adelaide	Australia	Thebarton Theatre	
February 15, 2000	Perth	Australia	Metropolis Concert Club (Perth)	
New York City
February 24, 2000	New York City	United States	Irving Plaza	Puya
February 25, 2000	New York City	United States	The Limelight	Glassjaw, One Minute Silence
Europe
February 28, 2000	Glasgow	United Kingdom	Barrowlands	Kittie, One Minute Silence
February 29, 2000	Manchester	United Kingdom	MDH	Kittie, One Minute Silence
March 1, 2000	Wolverhampton	United Kingdom	Wolverhampton Civic Hall	Kittie, One Minute Silence
March 2, 2000	Nottingham	United Kingdom	Rock City	Kittie, One Minute Silence
March 3, 2000	Portsmouth	United Kingdom	Portsmouth Guildhall	Kittie, One Minute Silence
March 4, 2000	Bristol	United Kingdom	Anson Room	Kittie, One Minute Silence
March 5, 2000	London	United Kingdom	Brixton Academy	Kittie, One Minute Silence
March 6, 2000	Paris	France	Nulle Part Ailleurs	—N/a
March 7, 2000	Tilburg	Netherlands	013	One Minute Silence, Kill II This
March 8, 2000	Antwerp	Belgium	Hof Ter Lo	One Minute Silence, Kill II This
March 9, 2000	Strasbourg	France	La Laiterie	One Minute Silence, Kill II This
March 11, 2000	Nantes	France	Olympic	One Minute Silence, Kill II This
March 12, 2000	Bordeaux	France	Théâtre Barbey	One Minute Silence, Kill II This
March 13, 2000	Toulouse	France	Le Bikini	One Minute Silence, Kill II This
March 14, 2000	Villeurbanne	France	Le Transbordeur	One Minute Silence, Kill II This
March 16, 2000	Barcelona	Spain	Zeleste JJ	One Minute Silence, Kill II This
March 17, 2000	Madrid	Spain	La Riviera	One Minute Silence, Kill II This
~~March 19, 2000~~	~~Pratteln~~	~~Switzerland~~	~~Z7~~ CANCELLED	One Minute Silence, Kill II This
~~March 20, 2000~~	~~Milan~~	~~Italy~~	~~Alcatraz~~ CANCELLED	One Minute Silence, Kill II This
~~March 22, 2000~~	~~Vienna~~	~~Austria~~	~~Planet Music~~ CANCELLED	One Minute Silence, Kill II This
~~March 23, 2000~~	~~Nuremberg~~	~~Germany~~	~~Forum~~ CANCELLED	One Minute Silence, Kill II This
~~March 25, 2000~~	~~Stuttgart~~	~~Germany~~	~~Die Roehre~~ RESCHEDULED	One Minute Silence, Kill II This
~~March 26, 2000~~	~~Frankfurt~~	~~Germany~~	~~Batschkapp~~ RESCHEDULED	One Minute Silence, Kill II This
~~March 27, 2000~~	~~Essen~~	~~Germany~~	~~Zeche Carl~~ RESCHEDULED	One Minute Silence, Kill II This
~~March 28, 2000~~	~~Hamburg~~	~~Germany~~	~~Markthalle~~ RESCHEDULED	One Minute Silence, Kill II This
~~March 29, 2000~~	~~Berlin~~	~~Germany~~	~~SO36~~ RESCHEDULED	One Minute Silence, Kill II This
~~March 31, 2000~~	~~Copenhagen~~	~~Denmark~~	~~Pumpehuset~~ CANCELLED	One Minute Silence, Kill II This
~~April 1, 2000~~	~~Oslo~~	~~Norway~~	~~Rockefeller Music Hall~~ CANCELLED	One Minute Silence, Kill II This
~~April 3, 2000~~	~~Stockholm~~	~~Sweden~~	~~Fryshuset~~ CANCELLED	One Minute Silence, Kill II This
North America
April 7, 2000	Toronto	Canada	The Warehouse	Kittie, Dope
April 8, 2000	Montreal	Canada	Métropolis	Kittie, Dope
April 9, 2000	Toronto	Canada	The Warehouse	Kittie, Dope
April 10, 2000	London	Canada	The Drink	Kittie, Dope
April 12, 2000	Pittsburgh	United States	IC Light Amphitheatre	Mudvayne, Dope
April 13, 2000	Cleveland	United States	Agora Theatre and Ballroom	Mudvayne, Dope
April 14, 2000	Detroit	United States	Harpos Concert Theatre	Mudvayne, Dope
April 15, 2000	Chicago	United States	Congress Theater	Mudvayne, Dope
April 16, 2000	Milwaukee	United States	Eagles Ballroom	Mudvayne, Dope
April 17, 2000	Columbia	United States	The Blue Note	Mudvayne
April 19, 2000	San Antonio	United States	Live Oak Civic Center	Mudvayne
April 20, 2000	McAllen	United States	Villa Real Convention Center	Mudvayne
April 21, 2000	Houston	United States	International Ballroom	Mudvayne, Ultraspank
April 22, 2000	Dallas	United States	Bronco Bowl	Mudvayne, Ultraspank
April 23, 2000	Oklahoma City	United States	Myriad Exhibit Hall	Mudvayne, Ultraspank
April 24, 2000	Wichita	United States	Cotillion Ballroom	Mudvayne, Ultraspank
April 26, 2000	El Paso	United States	El Paso County Coliseum	Mudvayne, One Minute Silence
April 27, 2000	Phoenix	United States	Celebrity Theatre	Mudvayne, One Minute Silence
April 28, 2000	Del Mar	United States	Del Mar Activities Center	Mudvayne, One Minute Silence
April 29, 2000	Las Vegas	United States	House of Blues	Mudvayne, One Minute Silence
April 30, 2000	San Francisco	United States	Maritime Hall	Mudvayne, One Minute Silence
May 2, 2000	Seattle	United States	DV8	Mudvayne, One Minute Silence
May 3, 2000	Vancouver	Canada	Commodore Ballroom	Mudvayne, One Minute Silence
May 4, 2000	Portland	United States	Roseland Theater	Mudvayne, One Minute Silence
~~May 5, 2000~~	~~Spokane~~	United States	~~Spokane Arena~~ RESCHEDULED	Mudvayne, One Minute Silence
May 6, 2000	Boise	United States	BSU Pavilion	Mudvayne, One Minute Silence
May 7, 2000	Salt Lake City	United States	Promontary Hall	Mudvayne, One Minute Silence
May 9, 2000	Sacramento	United States	Memorial Auditorium	Mudvayne
May 10, 2000	Reno	United States	Rodeo Rock	Mudvayne
May 11, 2000	Fresno	United States	Rainbow Ballroom	Mudvayne
May 12, 2000	Los Angeles	United States	Hollywood Palladium	Mudvayne, Hed PE
May 13, 2000	Pomona	United States	The Glass House	Mudvayne, Hed PE
May 15, 2000	Tucson	United States	New West	Mudvayne, Hed PE, Taproot
May 16, 2000	Albuquerque	United States	Convention Center	Static-X, Mudvayne, Hed PE, Pitchshifter, Taproot, Ultraspank
May 17, 2000	Denver	United States	Fillmore Auditorium	Mudvayne
~~May 19, 2000~~	~~Sioux Falls~~	United States	~~Sioux Falls Expo Hall~~ RESCHEDULED	Mudvayne
~~May 20, 2000~~	~~Fargo~~	United States	~~Fargo Civic Center~~ RESCHEDULED	Mudvayne
May 23, 2000	Cedar Rapids	United States	Five Seasons Center	various
May 24, 2000	Peoria	United States	Peoria Civic Center	various
May 25, 2000	La Crosse	United States	La Crosse Center	various
May 26, 2000	Madison	United States	Dane County Coliseum	various
May 27, 2000	Somerset	United States	X-Fest / Float Rite Park	various
~~May 28, 2000~~	~~Washington, D.C.~~	United States	~~HFStival~~ CANCELLED	various
Europe
June 1, 2000	Essen	Germany	Zeche Carl	One Minute Silence
June 3, 2000	Nijmegen	Netherlands	Dynamo Open Air	various
June 4, 2000	Frankfurt	Germany	Batschkapp	One Minute Silence, Kittie
June 5, 2000	Stuttgart	Germany	LKA	One Minute Silence, Kittie
June 7, 2000	Hamburg	Germany	Große Freiheit	One Minute Silence, Kittie
June 8, 2000	Berlin	Germany	Columbiahalle	One Minute Silence, Kittie
June 9, 2000	Nuremberg	Germany	Rock Im Park	various
June 10, 2000	Nürburgring	Germany	Rock Am Ring	various
June 11, 2000	Monza	Italy	Gods of Metal Festival 2K	various
North America
June 16, 2000	Mountain View	United States	Shoreline Amphitheatre	various
July 7, 2000	Sioux Falls	United States	Sioux Empire Fair Expo Hall	Mudvayne
July 8, 2000	Fargo	United States	Civic Memorial Auditorium	Mudvayne
July 13, 2000	Spokane	United States	Spokane Convention Center	Mudvayne
Europe
August 25, 2000	Hasselt	Belgium	Pukkelpop	various
August 26, 2000	Leeds	England	Leeds Festival	various
August 27, 2000	Reading	England	Reading Festival	various
~~August 30, 2000~~	~~Dublin~~	~~Ireland~~	~~Point Depot~~ CANCELLED	—N/a
North America This short series of shows took place after the summer's Tattoo the Earth tour.
October 24, 2000	Walker	United States	DeltaPlex Arena	—N/a
October 25, 2000	Trotwood	United States	Hara Arena	—N/a
October 27, 2000	Washington, D.C.	United States	9:30 Club	Mudvayne, Hatebreed
October 28, 2000	Washington, D.C.	United States	9:30 Club/WHFS Show	Mudvayne, Hatebreed
October 29, 2000	Asbury Park	United States	Asbury Park Convention Hall	Mudvayne, Hatebreed
October 30, 2000	Boston	United States	Avalon Ballroom	Mudvayne, Hatebreed
October 31, 2000	New York City	United States	Hammerstein Ballroom	Mudvayne, Hatebreed
November 1, 2000	Philadelphia	United States	Electric Factory	Mudvayne, Hatebreed
