= Livin la Vida Loco =

1999 concert tour by Coal Chamber

- Concert by Coal Chamber, Slipknot, Machine Head, Amen, Dope
- Location: North America
- Start date: July 31, 1999
- End date: November 14, 1999
- Legs: 1
- No. of shows: 73
Slipknot tour chronology
Ozzfest 1999 (1999)	Livin la Vida Loco (1999)	World Domination Tour (1999–2000)

Livin La Vida Loco, a play on the song title "Livin' la Vida Loca" by Ricky Martin, was a concert tour in 1999. It was headlined by Coal Chamber, and organized by the band's record label, Roadrunner Records. Other bands that were featured included Machine Head, Slipknot, Amen and Dope. The tour was formed after Coal Chamber were thrown off a tour with the Insane Clown Posse, and picked up Nadja Peulen as an interim bassist during the tour.

== Tour dates ==
Date	City	Country	Venue	Other bands
August 16, 1999	Lawrence	United States	The Bottleneck	Machine Head; Slipknot; Amen
August 19, 1999	Dallas	United States	Deep Ellum Live	Machine Head; Slipknot; Amen
August 20, 1999	Oklahoma City	United States	City Tower Theater	Machine Head; Slipknot; Amen
August 21, 1999	Maryland Heights	United States	Riverport Amphitheater	Machine Head; Slipknot; Amen
August 22, 1999	Saint Paul	United States	Roy Wilkins Auditorium	Machine Head; Slipknot; Amen
August 23, 1999	Lincoln	United States	The Royal Grove	Machine Head; Slipknot; Amen
August 25, 1999	Milwaukee	United States	The Rave	Machine Head; Slipknot; Amen
August 26, 1999	Peoria	United States	Madison Theatre	Machine Head; Slipknot; Amen
August 27, 1999	Kansas City	United States	City Market	Machine Head; Slipknot; Amen
August 28, 1999	Tulsa	United States	Mohawk Park	Machine Head; Slipknot; Amen
August 29, 1999	Amarillo	United States	Midnight Rodeo	Machine Head; Slipknot; Amen
August 31, 1999	Lubbock	United States	Liquid 2000	Machine Head; Slipknot; Amen
September 1, 1999	Killeen	United States	Club Oz	Machine Head; Slipknot; Amen
September 2, 1999	Corpus Christi	United States	Bucket's Sports Bar & Grill	Machine Head; Slipknot; Amen
September 3, 1999	Odessa	United States	Ector County Coliseum	Machine Head; Slipknot; Amen
September 4, 1999	Shreveport	United States	Malibu Beach Club	Machine Head; Slipknot; Amen
September 6, 1999	Memphis	United States	The New Daisy Theatre	Machine Head; Slipknot; Amen
September 7, 1999	Chicago	United States	Riviera Theatre	Machine Head; Slipknot; Amen
September 8, 1999	Madison	United States	Headliners	Machine Head; Slipknot; Amen
September 9, 1999	Grand Rapids	United States	Orbit Room	Machine Head; Slipknot; Amen
September 10, 1999	Detroit	United States	Harpos Concert Theatre	Machine Head; Slipknot; Amen
September 11, 1999	Cleveland	United States	Nautica Stage	Machine Head; Slipknot; Amen
September 12, 1999	Columbus	United States	Al Rosa Villa	Machine Head; Slipknot; Amen
September 13, 1999	Sauget	United States	Pop's	Machine Head; Slipknot; Amen
September 14, 1999	New York City	United States	Roseland Ballroom	Machine Head; Slipknot; Amen
September 15, 1999	Hartford	United States	Webster Theater	Machine Head; Slipknot; Amen
September 16, 1999	Scranton	United States	Tink's	Machine Head; Slipknot; Amen
September 17, 1999	Philadelphia	United States	Electric Factory	Machine Head; Slipknot; Amen
September 18, 1999	Asbury Park	United States	The Paramount Theatre at Asbury Park Convention Hall	Machine Head; Slipknot; Amen
September 19, 1999	Worcester	United States	LocoBazooka	Machine Head; Slipknot; Amen
September 20, 1999	Washington, D.C.	United States	9:30 Club	Machine Head; Slipknot; Amen
September 22, 1999	Toronto	Canada	Warehouse	Machine Head; Slipknot; Amen
September 23, 1999	Montreal	Canada	Le Spectrum	Machine Head; Slipknot; Amen
September 24, 1999	Lewiston	United States	Civic Center	Machine Head; Slipknot; Amen
September 25, 1999	Providence	United States	Lupo's	Machine Head; Slipknot; Amen
September 27, 1999	Spartanburg	United States	Ground Zero	Machine Head; Slipknot; Amen
September 28, 1999	Atlanta	United States	The Masquerade	Machine Head; Slipknot; Amen
September 29, 1999	Tampa	United States	Masquerade	Machine Head; Slipknot; Amen
October 1, 1999	Lake Buena Vista	United States	House of Blues	Machine Head; Slipknot; Amen
October 3, 1999	Fort Lauderdale	United States	Chili Pepper	Machine Head; Slipknot; Amen
October 9, 1999	Las Vegas	United States	Sam Boyd Complex	Slipknot; Dope; Amen
October 11, 1999	San Bernardino	United States	Citrus Fair	Sevendust; Machine Head; Slipknot; Dope; Orange 9mm Amen
October 13, 1999	Albuquerque	United States	Sunshine Theater	Slipknot; Dope; Amen
October 14, 1999	Colorado Springs	United States	Colorado Music Hall	Slipknot; Dope; Amen
October 15, 1999	Denver	United States	Ogden Theatre	Slipknot; Dope; Amen
October 17, 1999	Des Moines	United States	Super Toad	Slipknot; Dope
October 18, 1999	Kansas City	United States	Beaumont Club	Slipknot; Dope
October 19, 1999	Sauget	United States	Pop's	Slipknot; Dope
October 20, 1999	Wichita	United States	Cotillion Ballroom	Slipknot; Dope
October 21, 1999	Austin	United States	Backroom	Slipknot; Dope
October 22, 1999	Houston	United States	International Ballroom	Slipknot; Dope
October 23, 1999	McAllen	United States	Villa Real Convention Center	Slipknot; Dope
October 24, 1999	San Antonio	United States	Tejano Texas	Slipknot; Dope
October 26, 1999	Birmingham	United States	Five Points Music Hall	Slipknot; Dope
October 27, 1999	New Orleans	United States	Tipitina's	Slipknot; Dope
October 30, 1999	Dallas	United States	Freaker's Ball (Starplex Amphitheater)	Chevelle; Machine Head; Megadeth; Sevendust; Slipknot; Static-X
October 31, 1999	Tulsa	United States	Brady Theater	Slipknot; Dope
November 1, 1999	Omaha	United States	Sokol Auditorium	Slipknot; Dope
November 2, 1999	Tea	United States	Twisters	Slipknot; Dope
November 3, 1999	Winnipeg	Canada	Rendezvous	Slipknot; Dope
November 5, 1999	Calgary	Canada	McEvan Hall	Slipknot; Dope
November 6, 1999	Edmonton	Canada	Golden Garter	Slipknot; Dope
November 8, 1999	Vancouver	Canada	Croatian Cultural Centre	Slipknot; Dope
November 9, 1999	Seattle	United States	DV8	Slipknot; Dope
November 10, 1999	Portland	United States	Roseland Theater	Slipknot; Dope
November 11, 1999	Sacramento	United States	Crest Theatre	Dope
November 12, 1999	Petaluma	United States	Phoenix Theatre	Slipknot; Dope
November 13, 1999	San Francisco	United States	Maritime Hall	Slipknot; Dope
November 14, 1999	Los Angeles	United States	The Palace	Slipknot; Dope
