= American Dream Tour =

2024 concert tour by 21 Savage

- Tour by 21 Savage
- Associated album: American Dream
- Start date: May 1, 2024
- End date: November 23, 2024
- Legs: 1
- No. of shows: 50
- Supporting acts: JID; Nardo Wick; 21 Lil Harold (1st leg only for all three)

21 Savage concert chronology
- It's All a Blur Tour (2023); American Dream Tour (2024)

The American Dream Tour was the third concert tour by British-American rapper 21 Savage, in promotion of his third studio album, American Dream (2024). The tour began on May 1, 2024, at the Rogers Arena in Vancouver, Canada, and ended on June 11, 2024, at Yas Island as part of the Wireless Festival for the Middle East in Abu Dhabi, United Arab Emirates on November 23, 2024. Fellow American rappers JID, Nardo Wick and 21 Lil Harold served as opening acts for the first leg of the tour.

== Tour dates ==
List of concerts, showing date, city, country, venue, opening acts, tickets sold, amount of available tickets and gross revenue
Date	City	Country	Venue	Opening act(s)	Attendance / Capacity	Revenue
Leg 1 - North America
May 1, 2024	Vancouver	Canada	Rogers Arena	JID; Nardo Wick; 21 Lil Harold	—	—
May 3, 2024	Auburn	United States	White River Amphitheatre	JID; Nardo Wick; 21 Lil Harold	—	—
May 5, 2024	Ridgefield	United States	RV Inn Style Resorts Amphitheater	JID; Nardo Wick; 21 Lil Harold	—	—
May 7, 2024	Inglewood	United States	Kia Forum	JID; Nardo Wick; 21 Lil Harold	—	—
May 9, 2024	Concord	United States	Toyota Pavilion at Concord	JID; Nardo Wick; 21 Lil Harold	—	—
May 11, 2024	Phoenix	United States	Talking Stick Resort Amphitheatre	JID; Nardo Wick; 21 Lil Harold	—	—
May 12, 2024	Albuquerque	United States	Isleta Amphitheater	JID; Nardo Wick; 21 Lil Harold	—	—
May 14, 2024	Austin	United States	Germania Insurance Amphitheater	JID; Nardo Wick; 21 Lil Harold	—	—
May 15, 2024	Dallas	United States	Dos Equis Pavilion	JID; Nardo Wick; 21 Lil Harold	—	—
May 16, 2024	The Woodlands	United States	Cynthia Woods Mitchell Pavilion	JID; Nardo Wick; 21 Lil Harold	—	—
May 18, 2024	Rogers	United States	Walmart Arkansas Music Pavilion	JID; Nardo Wick; 21 Lil Harold	—	—
May 19, 2024	Maryland Heights	United States	Hollywood Casino Amphitheatre	JID; Nardo Wick; 21 Lil Harold	—	—
May 21, 2024	Tinley Park	United States	Credit Union 1 Amphitheatre	JID; Nardo Wick; 21 Lil Harold	—	—
May 22, 2024	Cincinnati	United States	Riverbend Music Center	JID; Nardo Wick; 21 Lil Harold	—	—
May 23, 2024	Noblesville	United States	Ruoff Music Center	JID; Nardo Wick; 21 Lil Harold	—	—
May 25, 2024	Toronto	Canada	Budweiser Stage	JID; Nardo Wick; 21 Lil Harold	—	—
May 27, 2024	Toronto	Canada	Budweiser Stage	JID; Nardo Wick; 21 Lil Harold	—	—
May 29, 2024	Cuyahoga Falls	United States	Blossom Music Center	JID; Nardo Wick; 21 Lil Harold	—	—
May 31, 2024	Mansfield	United States	Xfinity Center	JID; Nardo Wick; 21 Lil Harold	—	—
June 1, 2024	Hartford	United States	Xfinity Theatre	JID; Nardo Wick; 21 Lil Harold	—	—
June 2, 2024	Bristow	United States	Jiffy Lube Live	JID; Nardo Wick; 21 Lil Harold	—	—
June 4, 2024	Virginia Beach	United States	Veterans United Home Loans Amphitheater	JID; Nardo Wick; 21 Lil Harold	—	—
June 5, 2024	Simpsonville	United States	CCNB Amphitheatre at Heritage Park	JID; Nardo Wick; 21 Lil Harold	—	—
June 6, 2024	Charlotte	United States	PNC Music Pavilion	JID; Nardo Wick; 21 Lil Harold	—	—
June 8, 2024 (Note: Part of the Governors Ball Music Festival.)	Queens	United States	Flushing Meadows–Corona Park	JID; Nardo Wick; 21 Lil Harold	—	—
June 9, 2024	Camden	United States	Freedom Mortgage Pavilion	JID; Nardo Wick; 21 Lil Harold	—	—
June 13, 2024	West Palm Beach	United States	iTHINK Financial Amphitheatre	JID; Nardo Wick; 21 Lil Harold	—	—
June 14, 2024	Tampa	United States	MidFlorida Credit Union Amphitheatre	JID; Nardo Wick; 21 Lil Harold	—	—
June 15, 2024	Atlanta	United States	Cellairis Amphitheatre at Lakewood	JID; Nardo Wick; 21 Lil Harold	—	—
Leg 2 - Overseas Festivals
June 29, 2024 (Note: Part of the I-Days Festival.)	Milan	Italy	Ippodromo del Galoppo di San Siro	—N/a	—	—
June 30, 2024 (Note: Part of the Longitude Festival.)	Dublin	Ireland	Marlay Park	—N/a	—	—
July 4, 2024 (Note: Part of the Roskilde Festival.)	Roskilde	Denmark	Dyrskuepladsen	—N/a	—	—
July 5, 2024 (Note: Part of the Open'er Festival.)	Gdynia	Poland	Lotnisko Gdynia-Kosakowo	—N/a	—	—
July 6, 2024 (Note: Part of the Splash! Festival.)	Gräfenhainichen	Germany	Ferropolis	—N/a	—	—
July 11, 2024 (Note: Part of the Openair Frauenfeld Festival.)	Frauenfeld	Switzerland	Grosse Allmend	—N/a	—	—
July 12, 2024 (Note: Part of the Les Ardentes Festival.)	Liège	Belgium	Parc Rocourt	—N/a	—	—
July 13, 2024 (Note: Part of the Wireless Festival.)	London	England	Finsbury Park	—N/a	—	—
July 16, 2024 (Note: Part of the Rock in Roma Festival.)	Rome	Italy	Ippodromo delle Capannelle	—N/a	—	—
August 16, 2024 (Note: Part of the Le Cabaret Vert Festival.)	Charleville-Mézières	France	Square Bayard	—N/a	—	—
August 17, 2024 (Note: Part of the Blockfest Festival.)	Tampere	Finland	Tampere Stadium	—N/a	—	—
August 23, 2024 (Note: Part of the Leeds Festival.)	Leeds	England	Bramham Park	—N/a	—	—
August 25, 2024 (Note: Part of the Reading Festival.)	Reading	England	Little John's Farm	—N/a	—	—
September 13, 2024 (Note: Part of the Rock in Rio Festival.)	Rio de Janeiro	Brazil	Parque Olímpico	—N/a	—	—
September 27, 2024 (Note: Part of the Listen Out Festival.)	Melbourne	Australia	Caribbean Gardens	—N/a	—	—
September 28, 2024 (Note: Part of the Listen Out Festival.)	Perth	Australia	HBF Arena	—N/a	—	—
September 29, 2024 (Note: Part of the Listen In Festival.)	Adelaide	Australia	Ellis Park	—N/a	—	—
October 4, 2024 (Note: Part of the Listen In Festival.)	Auckland	New Zealand	Mount Smart Stadium	—N/a	—	—
October 5, 2024 (Note: Part of the Listen Out Festival.)	Brisbane	Australia	Brisbane Showgrounds	—N/a	—	—
October 6, 2024 (Note: Part of the Listen Out Festival.)	Sydney	Australia	Centennial Park	—N/a	—	—
November 23, 2024 (Note: Part of the Wireless Middle East Festival.)	Abu Dhabi	United Arab Emirates	Yas Island	—N/a	—	—
Total					—	—
