= Redfest =

Music festival

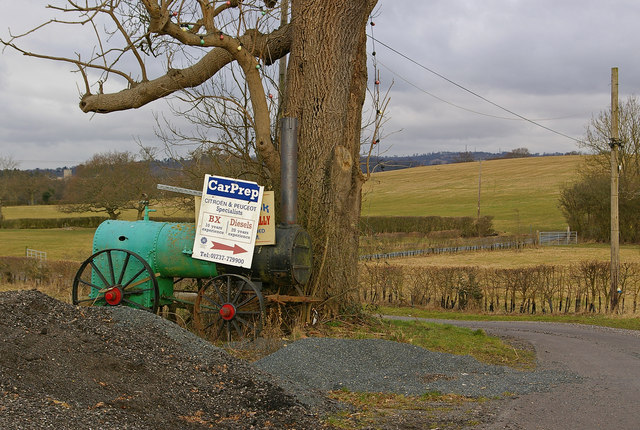
- Entrance to Robins Cook Farm, the location of Redfest
- Genre: Indie rock
- Dates: Weekend in July
- Locations: Redhill, Surrey, England, UK
- Years active: 2007–2014
- Founders: Matt Nichols
- Website: http://www.redfest.co.uk/

Redfest was an annual music festival at Robins Cook Farm, Kings Mill Lane, Nutfield, Redhill, Surrey, England. It was established in 2007 as a small (5,000 capacity) independent music festival geared toward youth, with over 70 per cent of its initial attenders expected to be under 17, and promised to be safer than its competitors such as GuilFest and Reading. The 2014 event took place over three days, from 24 to 26 July 2012. It featured a main stage, the Total Uprawr Stage, the Introducing Stage and two dance tents. The headliners on the main stage were Peace and Skindred.

== Redfest by year ==
=== Redfest 2007 ===
The first Redfest was held as a one-day event on 21 July with a line-up including The Ordinary Boys, Laura Marling, Newton Faulkner, Blood Red Shoes, The Silversun Pickups and Nizlopi.

=== Redfest 2008 ===
The 2008 festival was scheduled for 4–5 July with a line-up including Patrick Wolf, The Maccabees, Crystal Castles, Los Campesinos! and Johnny Foreigner, but was cancelled in early June due to poor ticket sales. After cancellation, ticket holders were able to transfer their tickets to Standon Calling. Redfest was rescheduled with a smaller lineup for 8–10 August.

- This City (band)
- Pete and the Pirates
- Ok Tokyo
- I Haunt Wizards
- SixNationState
- Koopa
- Hold Fire
- Thomas Tantrum
- Moral Soul
- The Thirst
- Satellite State
- BangBangBang
- Dreamer
- Barefoot Confessor
- Seven Story Down
- WinterKids
- The Tunics

=== Redfest 2009 ===
Held on 25 and 26 July Redfest had expanded for 2009 and featured a main stage, an acoustic stage and a local bands stage. Still aimed at a younger audience and remaining steadfastly independent and non-corporate, Redfest achieved its best attendance in 2009. With the emphasis on championing new talent, the 2009 line-up included The Whip, White Rabbits, The Kabeedies, Gloria Cycles, Floors and Walls, Subsource, Post War Years, Sukie, Dead Pixels, Andrew Morris and Us And Them (Now Run Young Lovers).

=== Redfest 2010 ===
The 2010 event took place over 23 and 24 July on Robins Cook Farm and featured a main stage, an acoustic stage and a Dance Tent. It was headlined by Enter Shikari on the Friday night, with Hadouken! closing the event on the main stage on Saturday. The event had a 2000-strong turn-out.

=== Redfest 2011 ===
Ed Sheeran played Redfest in 2011 on 23 July.

=== Redfest 2012 ===
The 2012 event took place over three days, from 20 to 22 July 2012. It featured a main stage, the Gozibe Introducing Stage, an acoustic stage and two dance tents. The headliners on the main stage were Modestep, Kids in Glass Houses and Foreign Beggars.

=== Redfest 2014 ===
The 2014 event took place over three days, from 24 to 26 July 2014. It features a main stage, the Total Uprawr Stage, the Introducing Stage and two dance tents. The headliners on the main stage are Peace and Skindred. Other artists who are performing include The Blackout, Lewis Watson, Krept and Konan, Lulu James, The Skints, Lost Alone amongst many others.
