= This City (band) =

English emo band

- Origin: Brighton, England
- Genres: Nu rave; emo
- Years active: 2006–2010
- Members: Chris Purr; Grant Coleman; Arran Day; George Travis; Nick Burdett

This City were an English nu rave and emo band from Brighton. Original drummer Jason Adelinia left to join the Pipettes in 2007 prior to a profile by The Guardian's Paul Lester. The band played Latitude Festival 2008, Redfest 2008, and supported the band "A"'s 10-date UK tour in December 2009.

This City appeared on the Orange unsignedAct competition in 2007, but withdrew due to artistic differences. In March that year they performed a live session for BBC Radio 1 on the Huw Stephens show, and in September the single "Romantic"/"With Loaded Guns" peaked at number 26 on the UK Independent Singles Chart. The band released the album We Were Like Sharks in 2009, which according to critic Emily Mackay, writing for the NME, gave "a fresh take on the genre by making music we can also move to".

== Discography ==
=== Singles ===
- "Romantic"/"With Loaded Guns" (2007)
- "Kids with Fireworks" (2009)

=== Albums ===
- We Were Like Sharks (2009)
