= Ascend Amphitheater =

Open-air event venue

- "The Green"

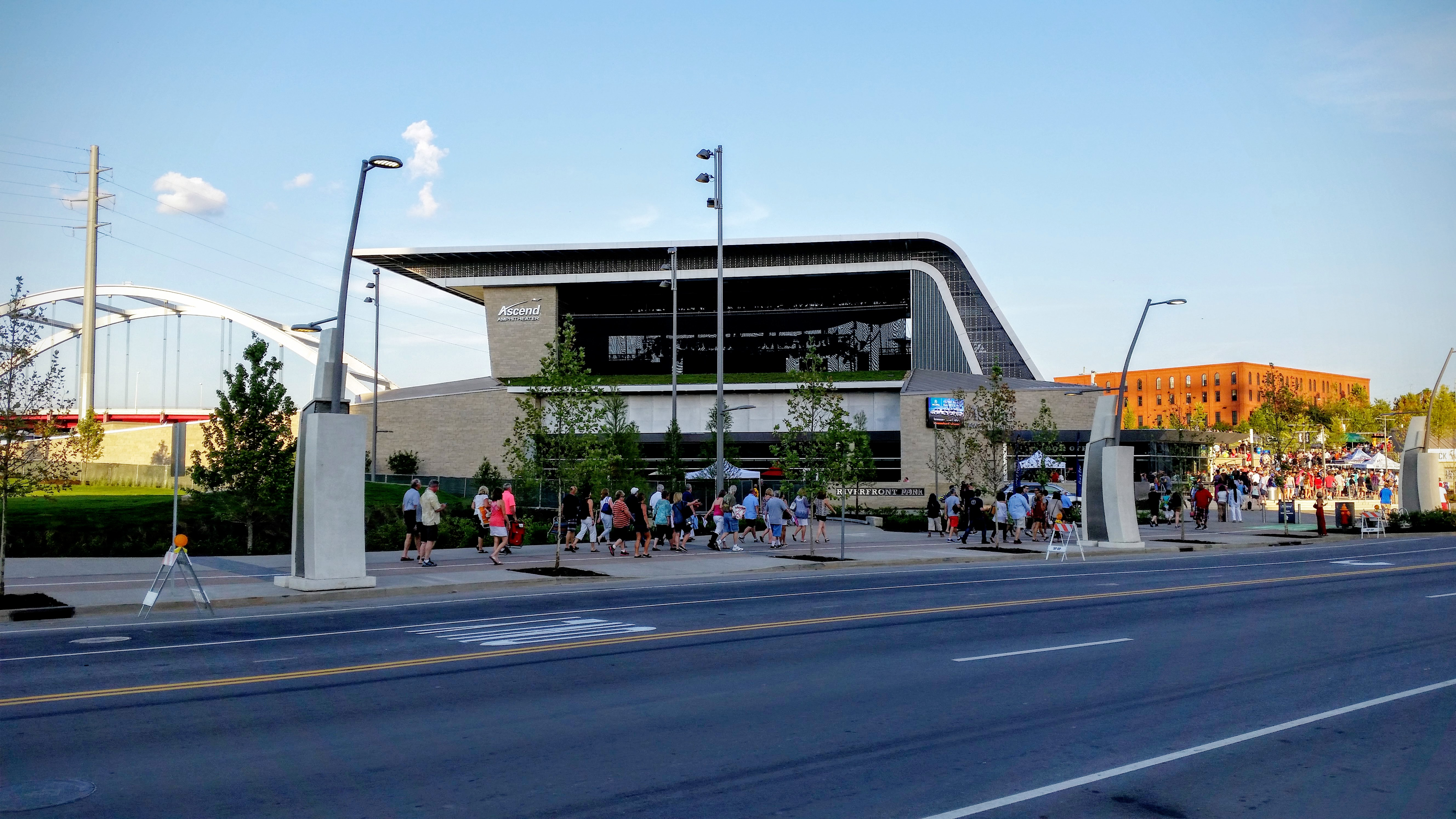
- Ascend Amphitheater in August 2015
- Interactive map of Ascend Amphitheater
- Location: 301 1st Avenue South; Nashville, Tennessee; United States
- Coordinates: 36.159178°N 86.771658°W
- Owner: Metropolitan Government of Nashville and Davidson County
- Operator: Opry Entertainment Group
- Capacity: 6,800; 2,300 fixed seats, 4,500 on the lawn

Construction
- Opened: July 30, 2015

Website
- ascendamphitheater.com

The Ascend Amphitheater is an open-air event venue located on the Cumberland River in Nashville, Tennessee. It is set inside the Metro Riverfront Park. The amphitheater seats 2,300 in fixed seating, and 4,500 on the lawn, with a total capacity of 6,800.

== History ==
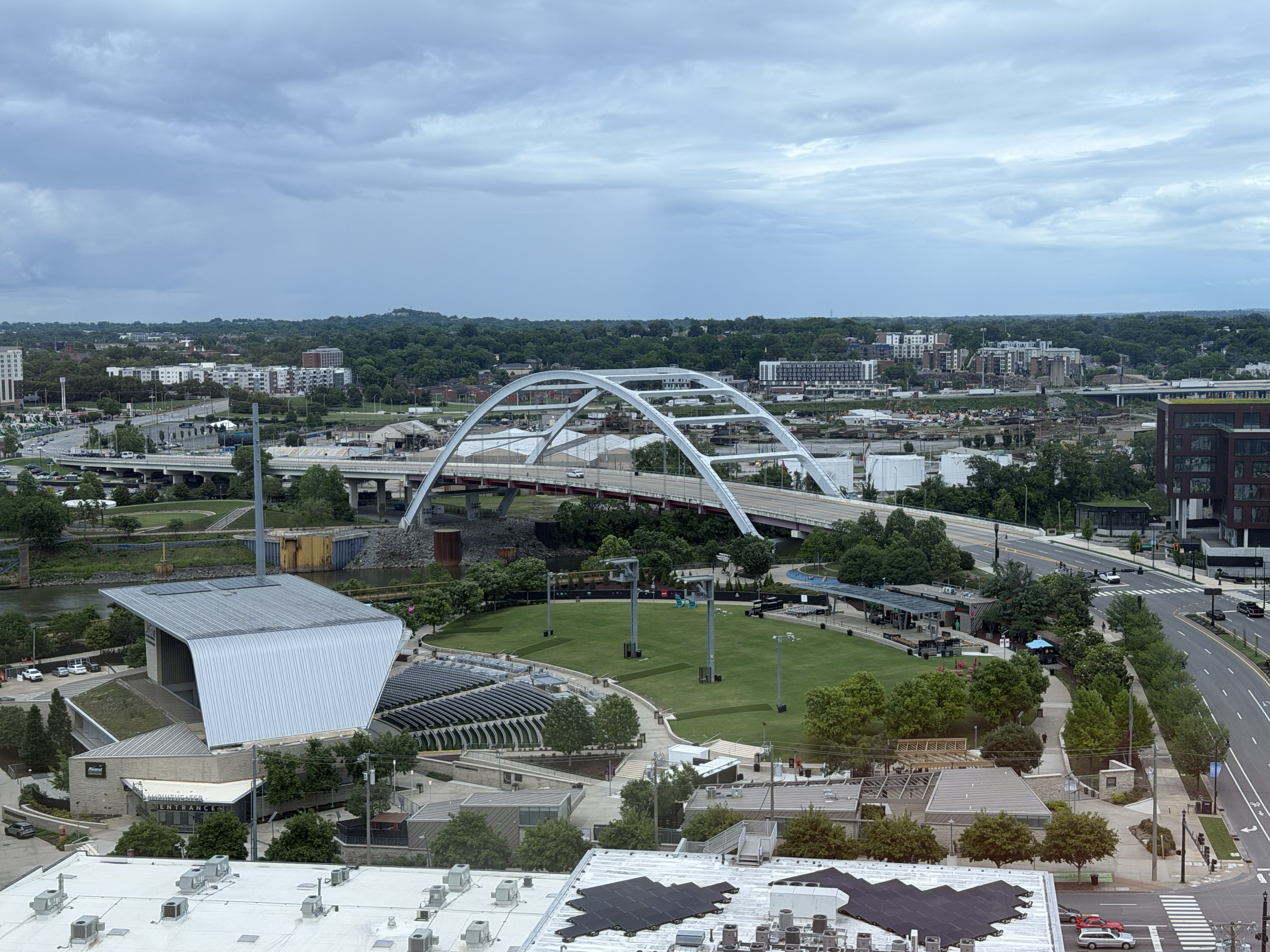
The Ascend Amphitheater (foreground) and Korean War Veterans Memorial Bridge (background) in May 2026

Ascend Amphitheater was first proposed on August 27, 2013, when then-Nashville Mayor Karl Dean unveiled plans for the venue on the site of the city's former thermal transfer plant, which was phased out in the early 2000s. The site was originally proposed to be the home of First Tennessee Field, a minor league baseball stadium for the Nashville Sounds. After numerous financing delays, the ballpark project was scrapped in 2007 and the land sat largely vacant until construction on the amphitheater began. The land was occasionally used as temporary event space in the meantime.

== Venue ==
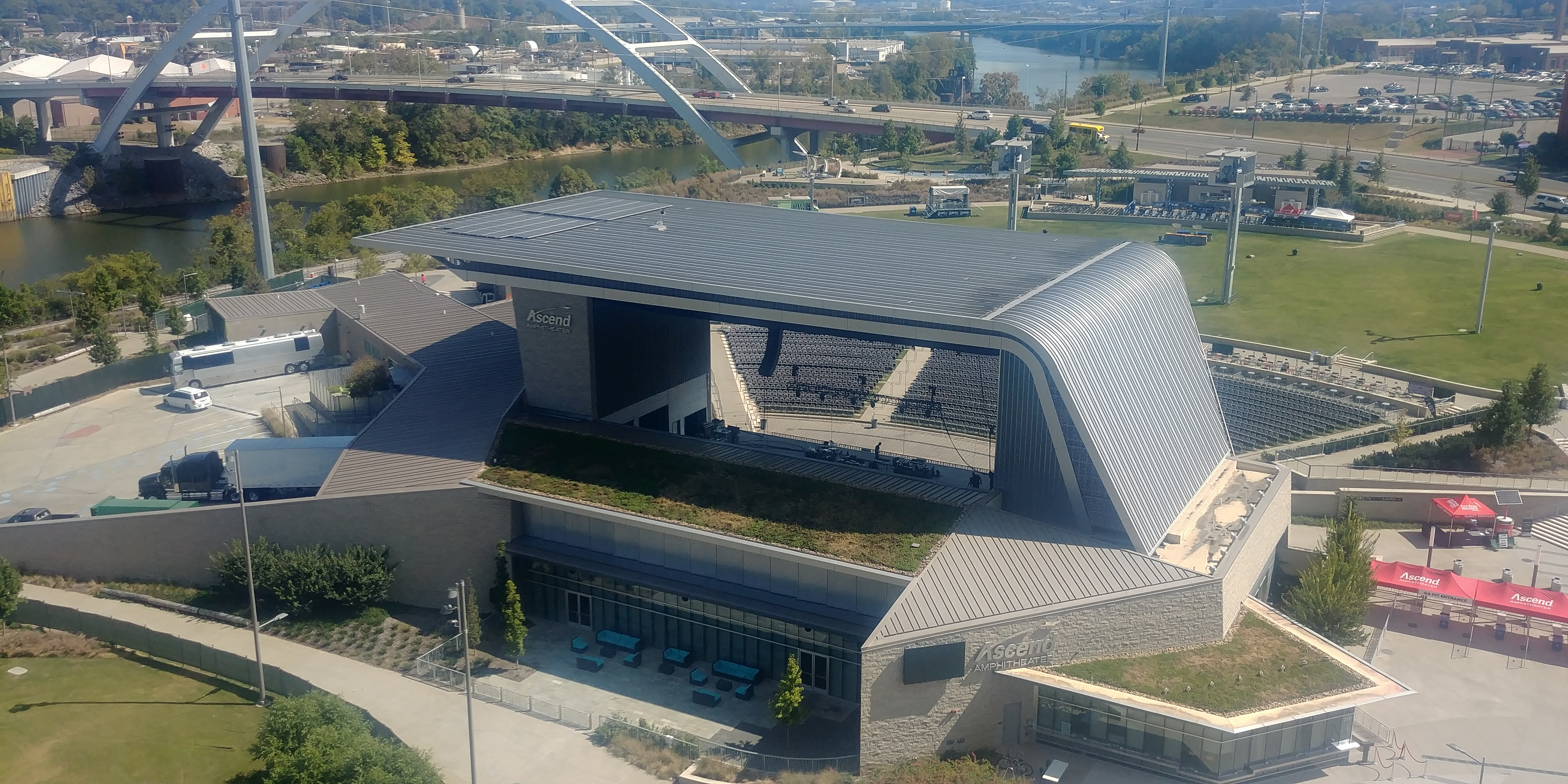
Ascend Amphitheater as seen from 222 2nd Avenue South in October 2017

Live Nation was the operator for the open-air venue for the first several years. Eric Church opened the venue with two sold-out shows on July 30 and 31, 2015, followed August 1 by Chicago and Earth, Wind & Fire during their Heart and Soul Tour 2015, and Phish on August 4. Live Nation signed a 10-year contract with Nashville and a 10-year contract with Ascend Federal Credit Union.

Opry Entertainment Group took over management of the venue in 2025.

== Concerts ==
A list of notable events held/to be held at the Amphitheater.

Artist	Tour/Event	Date	Opening act(s)
5 Seconds of Summer	No Shame Tour	June 30, 2022	—
Alabama Shakes	—	April 21, 2016	Dylan LeBlanc
Alan Jackson	Honky Tonk Highway Tour	May 19, 2017	Lee Ann Womack & Adam Wright
Alicia Keys	Alicia: The World Tour	August 2, 2020	
All Time Low & Sleeping with Sirens	Back To The Future Hearts Tour	October 13, 2015	One Ok Rock & Neck Deep
America Fest 2015	Loretta Lynn, Steve Earle, Nikki Lane, Valerie June, Tift Merritt & Eric Heywood, Gillian Welch, Emmy Rose Russell	September 19, 2015	—
Amos Lee	Spirit Fall Tour 2016	September 16, 2016	—
Australian Pink Floyd	—	August 22, 2015	LedZeppelin2
Avril Lavigne	Greatest Hits Tour	September 4, 2024	Simple Plan and Girlfriends
Barenaked Ladies	Last Summer on Earth Tour	July 5, 2016	OMD & Howard Jones
Bastille	Wild Wild World Tour	May 5, 2017	Mondo Cozmo
Ben Rector	The Biggest Tour I Have Done So Far Tour	August 27, 2016	Colony House
Blink-182	California Tour	August 8, 2016	A Day to Remember, All-American Rejects, & DJ Spider
Boyz II Men (with the Nashville Symphony)	—	September 11, 2016	—
Brand New & Modest Mouse	—	July 19, 2016	—
Bryan Adams	Get Up! Tour	April 15, 2015	—
Cage the Elephant	2016 Tour	May 19, 2016	Portugal. The Man
Carnival of Madness	2016 Tour; Black Stone Cherry, Halestorm, Shinedown, Whiskey Myers	August 4, 2016	—
Cheap Trick, Heart & Joan Jett & the Blackhearts	Rock Hall Three for All	September 19, 2017	—
Chicago and Earth, Wind & Fire	Heart and Soul Tour	August 1, 2015	—
Chris Stapleton	Chris Stapleton's All American Road Show	October 14, 2016	Lee Ann Womack
Chris Stapleton	Chris Stapleton's All American Road Show	October 15, 2016	Brent Cobb
Chris Tomlin	Love Ran Red Tour	October 8, 2015	Rend Collective
Chris Young	I'm Comin' Over World Tour	September 30, 2015	Jerrod Niemann & Cam
CMA Festival	Jonathan Jackson + Enation	June 9, 2016	—
CMA Festival	Ryan Lafferty	June 9, 2016	—
CMA Festival	Sara Evans	June 10, 2016	—
Cody Jinks	Change the Game Tour	April 27, 2024	The Steel Woods
Counting Crows	Somewhere Under Wonderland Tour	August 7, 2015	Citizen Cope & Hollis Brown
Counting Crows & Rob Thomas	Counting Crows & Rob Thomas on Tour	September 30, 2016	K. Philips
Dave Matthews and Tim Reynolds	2017 Tour	May 6, 2017	—
Dave Matthews and Tim Reynolds	2017 Tour	May 7, 2017	—
Depeche Mode	Global Spirit Tour	September 18, 2017	—
Dierks Bentley	Miles and Music for Kids	November 1, 2015	Thomas Rhett, The Cadillac Three, Cole Swindell, Florida Georgia Line, Canaan Smith, Brooke Eden
Disturbed & Rob Zombie	—	May 7, 2016	Pop Evil
Duran Duran	Paper Gods on Tour	July 6, 2016	Chic feat. Nile Rodgers
Eric Church	The Outsiders World Tour	July 30, 2015	J. Roddy Walston & The Business
Eric Church	The Outsiders World Tour	July 31, 2015	Ryan Bingham
Flight of the Conchords	Sing Flight of the Conchords	July 14, 2016	Arj Barker
Florence and the Machine	How Big, How Blue, How Beautiful Tour	October 9, 2015	—
Garth Brooks	—	October 24, 2016	—
Gary Clark Jr.	The Story of Sonny Boy Slim Tour	July 16, 2016	Raury
Goo Goo Dolls	Boxes Tour	August 5, 2016	Collective Soul & Tribe Society
Goo Goo Dolls	The Miracle Pill Summer Tour	August 29, 2020	Lifehouse
Grace Potter and the Nocturnals	Midnight Tour	October 10, 2015	Lake Street Dive
Hall & Oates	2015 Tour	September 14, 2015	—
Halsey	Hopeless Fountain Kingdom World Tour	July 18, 2018	Jessie Reyez
Halsey	For My Last Trick: The Tour	May 21, 2025	Julia Wolf & The Warning
Idina Menzel	Idina Menzel: World Tour	August 15, 2015	—
Jackson Browne	Standing in the Beach Tour	October 11, 2015	Larry Campbell & Teresa Williams
Jake Owen	—	April 27, 2017	Eric Paslay & LANco
Janet Jackson	Unbreakable World Tour	September 27, 2015	—
Jeff Beck	—	August 3, 2016	Buddy Guy
Jill Scott	—	August 5, 2015	Lecrae & BJ the Chicago Kid
Jimmy Buffett	I Don't Know Tour	May 26, 2016	Huey Lewis and the News
Jimmy Buffett	—	June 25, 2020	—
John Legend	Darkness & Light Tour	May 18, 2017	Gallant
John Legend	Bigger Love Tour	August 15, 2020	The War and Treaty
Journey	Eclipse Tour	July 27, 2016	Dave Mason
Kesha	The High Road Tour	May 16, 2020	Big Freedia
Kesha & Scissor Sisters	The Tits Out Tour	July 15, 2025	Slayyyter
Kings of Leon	Album release concert	October 6, 2016	—
Kip Moore	Me & My Kind Tour	August 10, 2017	Dustin Lynch, Jon Pardi, Brandy Clark & Chris Lane
The Lumineers	Cleopatra World Tour	September 20, 2017	Børns & Rayland Baxter
The Lumineers	Cleopatra World Tour	September 22, 2017	Børns & Rayland Baxter
Lynyrd Skynyrd	—	October 2, 2015	Blackstone Cherry
Meghan Trainor	The Untouchable Tour	August 6, 2017	Hailee Steinfeld & Common Kings
Muse & Thirty Seconds to Mars	2017 North American Tour	June 3, 2017	PVRIS
My Morning Jacket	The Waterfall Tour	August 6, 2015	Moon Taxi
NEEDTOBREATHE and Switchfoot	Tour de Compadres	August 14, 2015	Colony House & Drew Holcomb and the Neighbors
Neil Young & Promise of the Real	The Monsanto Years Tour	April 28, 2016	Steve Earle
Niall Horan	Flicker World Tour	July 23, 2018	Maren Morris
Odesza	A moment Apart	May 12, 2018	
Old Crow Medicine Show	—	August 28, 2015	The Devil Makes Three
Peter Frampton & Cheap Trick	—	August 16, 2015	Slash & Sammy Hagar
Phillip Phillips & Matt Nathanson	2016 Summer Tour	July 28, 2016	A Great Big World & Eric Hutchinson
Phish	—	August 4, 2015	—
Phish	Fall 2016 Tour	October 18, 2016	
Phish	Fall 2016 Tour	October 19, 2016	
Phish	—	August 4, 2020	—
Phish	—	August 5, 2020	—
Pretty Lights	Pretty Lights Hallows Eve	October 31, 2015	Goldroom, Chali 2na, Daily Bread, DJ Matoma
Ray LaMontagne	The Ouroboros Tour	July 29, 2016	—
Sheryl Crow	July 4th Celebration	July 4, 2016	—
The Smashing Pumpkins & Marilyn Manson	The End Times Tour	August 9, 2015	Cage
Snoop Dogg	Wellness Retreat Tour	April 28, 2017	Flatbush Zombies
Steely Dan	Rockabye Gollie Angel Tour	August 8, 2015	Elvis Costello & The Imposters
Steve Earle		September 19, 2015	
Styx (with the Nashville Symphony)	2016 North American Tour	May 21, 2016	—
Sublime with Rome	—	August 18, 2015	Rebelution, Pepper, & Mickey Avalon
Thomas Rhett	Home Team Tour	April 20, 2017	Kelsea Ballerini, Russell Dickerson & Ryan Hurd
Thomas Rhett	Home Team Tour	April 21, 2017	Kelsea Ballerini, Russell Dickerson & Ryan Hurd
Train	Play That Song Tour	May 31, 2017	O.A.R. & Natasha Bedingfield
Twenty One Pilots	Emotional Roadshow World Tour	August 7, 2016	Mutemath & Chef'Special
Umphrey's McGee	2016 Tour	August 26, 2016	Tauk
Uncle Kracker, Sugar Ray, Better Than Ezra & Eve 6	Playing Under the Sun Summer Tour	August 29, 2015	—
Weezer & Panic! at the Disco	Weezer and Panic! at the Disco Summer Tour 2016	July 13, 2016	Andrew McMahon in the Wilderness
Widespread Panic	Summer Tour 2015	September 5, 2015	—
Widespread Panic	Summer Tour 2015	September 6, 2015	—
ZZ Top	Grooves & Gravy Tour	September 1, 2015	Blackberry Smoke
ZZ Top	—	June 28, 2020	—

== See also ==
- List of contemporary amphitheatres
