= Tattoo the Earth =

2000–2002 concert tour by Slipknot

- Tour by Slipknot
- Location: United States
- Start date: July 14, 2000
- End date: October 14, 2002

Slipknot concert chronology
- World Domination Tour (1999–2000); Tattoo the Earth (2000–2002); Iowa World Tour (2001–2002)

Tattoo the Earth was a concert tour from 2000 to 2002 in the United States. Scott Alderman, the festival's creator, believed that the tour would help "catch the vibe" between the musical artists and the body artists, saying in a prepared statement, "Nothing represents the counter youth culture like music and body art. It is a statement of purpose and a passport to another way of living. We're simply creating a venue where it can be expressed."

MTV revealed on June 6, 2000 that Slayer and Sepultura recently joined the tour. Metallica, which was originally not part of the tour, officially announced on June 13, 2000 that they would be joining it. The following day, Stone Temple Pilots announced plans to join the tour.

The tour, with part of it taking place during the summer, posed a challenge to Slipknot in particular. The band performed onstage in masks, and even under the best circumstances, they found them uncomfortable. The band's drummer Joey Jordison commented, "Everyone passes out two or three times per tour. It never happens 'til the end of the show. People are like, 'I don't know how you do it with the mask on, let alone one-piece wool coveralls in 110 degree heat.' But it's the music that drives us, and we've built up a tolerance for it."

Alderman announced in 2022 that the tour would return in August that year, with Anthrax headlining.

== Tour dates ==
| Date | City | Country | Venue |
First year
| July 15, 2000 | Portland | United States | Portland Meadows (KUFO Rockfest 2000) |
| July 18, 2000 | Lawrence | United States | Burcham Park |
| July 20, 2000 | East Rutherford | United States | Giants Stadium |
| July 21, 2000 | Scranton | United States | Coors Light Amphitheatre |
| July 22, 2000 | Boston | United States | Suffolk Downs |
| July 24, 2000 | Cleveland | United States | Nautica Stage |
| July 26, 2000 | Bridgeview | United States | World Golf Dome |
| July 27, 2000 | Des Moines | United States | Waterworks Park |
| July 28, 2000 | Somerset | United States | Float Rite Park Amphitheater (93x Clambake 2000) |
| July 29, 2000 | Milwaukee | United States | The Rave |
| July 30, 2000 | Pontiac | United States | Phoenix Plaza Amphitheater |
| August 2, 2000 | San Antonio | United States | Far West |
| August 4, 2000 | Mercedes | United States | Mercedes Showgrounds |
| August 5, 2000 | Houston | United States | Pasadena Fairgrounds |
| August 6, 2000 | Dallas | United States | Starplex Amphitheatre |
| August 10, 2000 | Morrison | United States | Red Rocks Amphitheatre |
| August 12, 2000 | San Bernardino | United States | Orange Pavilion |
| August 13, 2000 | Phoenix | United States | Manzanita Speedway |
Second year
| August 2, 2002 | Rosemont | United States | Allstate Arena |
| August 3, 2002 | Rosemont | United States | Allstate Arena |
| August 4, 2002 | Rosemont | United States | Allstate Arena |
| August 9, 2002 | Oakland | United States | The Arena in Oakland |
| August 10, 2002 | Oakland | United States | The Arena in Oakland |
| August 11, 2002 | Oakland | United States | The Arena in Oakland |
| October 12, 2002 | Worcester | United States | Worcester's Centrum Centre |
| October 13, 2002 | Worcester | United States | Worcester's Centrum Centre |
| October 14, 2002 | Worcester | United States | Worcester's Centrum Centre |
Third year
| August 27, 2023 | Worcester | United States | Worcester Palladium Outdoors |

== Bands ==
2000:

- Slipknot
- Slayer
- Sepultura
- Sevendust
- Hed PE
- Nashville Pussy
- Spineshank (dropped off after July 20)
- Downset
- Cold (until July 30)
- Mudvayne
- Hatebreed
- Full Devil Jacket
- One Minute Silence (started on July 27)
- U.P.O. (until July 30)
- Nothingface
- Professional Murder Music (started on July 30)
- Amen
- Systematic (until July 28)
- Esham
- The Workhorse Movement
- Relative Ash
- Famous

Coal Chamber was scheduled as one of the tour headliners, but dropped off before it started. Puya also dropped off the tour

Select shows:

- Stone Temple Pilots (Portland only)
- Metallica (New Jersey only)
- Dope (Iowa only)
- Lamb of God (Massachusetts and Michigan only)

== Tattoo artists ==
Tattoo artists Sean Vasquez, Paul Booth, Bernie Luther, Filip Leu and Jack Rudy were featured on the tour. In 2002, Alderman used the Tattoo the Earth name to host two tattoo conventions - one in Chicago, the other in Oakland - featuring artists including

- Jack Lowe
- Matt Schager
- Bernie Luther
- Sean Vasquez
- Kari Barba
- Mike Davis
- Chuck Eldridge
- Grime
- Don Ed Hardy
- Patty Kelley
- Corey Miller
- Ethan Morgan
- Jack Rudy
- Lyle Tuttle
- Eric Merrill
- Flo Amblard
- Tin Tin
- Deano Cook
- Tony Olivas
- Michael Hubert
- Guy Aitchison
- James Kern
- Ben Wahhhh
- Genziana
- Horishio
- Horitoshi
- Shige
- Borneo Headhunters
- Kurt Wiscombe
- Chris Dingwell
- Bob Tyrrell
- Leo Zulueta
- Sieto Van der Velde
- Joe Capobianco
- Mario Barth
- Paul Booth
- Jon Clue
- Anil Gupta
- Pat Sinatra
- Robert Hernandez
- Filip Leu
- Timothy Hoyer
- Aaron Bell
