= Tribe Society =

Tribe Society is an American indie synth-pop collective formed by the core members of the band Gentlemen Hall. They are also known for their eerie sounds compiled with indie rock sounds, and are often compared to Imagine Dragons. The band has been active since 2015. On April 15, 2016, the band released a six track EP, Lucid Dreams and on March 3, 2017, they released their first full-length album, We Sell Drugs.

== Formation ==
After Gentlemen Hall split, its members Seth Hachen, Gavin Merlot, Bradford Alderman, Rory Given and Phil Boucher decided to create a new band called 'Tribe Society'.

== Discography ==
=== Albums ===
- Delirium Sonata (2015)
- Lucid Dreams EP (2016)
- We Sell Drugs (2017)
- 27 (2017)

=== Singles ===
- "Kings" (2015)
- "Smoke out the Window" (2016)
- "Secrets" (2017)
- "Summer Flame" (2026)
- "Giving It" (2026)

=== Music videos ===
| Year | Video | Director |
|---|---|---|
| 2015 | "Kings" | unknown |
| 2016 | "Pain Told Love" | AJ Schortman |
| 2016 | "Smoke out the Window" | AJ Schortman |
| 2017 | "Secrets" | George Evan |
