= Steel Beans =

- Also known as: Steel Beans
- Born: Jeremy DeBardi; April 9th 1988
- Origin: Everett, Washington
- Genre: Rock
- Years active: 2000–present
- Website: steelbeans.com

Jeremy DeBardi is an American musician, best known for performing under the moniker Steel Beans. He is best known for his song "Molotov Cocktail Lounge", which went viral on social media, leading him to open for acts such as Tenacious D and Tool.

== History ==
DeBardi began Steel Beans in 2000, mainly playing gigs around Everett, and Washington in general.

In 2022, a video of DeBardi playing guitar, drums and singing at the same time to his song "Molotov Cocktail Lounge" went viral across social media.

In early 2023, it was announced that Steel Beans would support Tenacious D on their Spicy Meatball Tour, playing a small run of shows in the United States, and an extended tour across Europe.

Later in 2023, it was announced that Steel Beans would support Tool on their fall tour.
