= WinterKids =

British band

- Origin: Surrey, England
- Genres: Indie rock, art rock
- Years active: 2006–2010
- Members: James Snider; Hannah Snider; Chris Muldoon; Bradley Osborne; Tom Downer

WinterKids was a five-piece art pop band from Peaslake, Surrey, England. They operated their own production studio/home "Little House", have been favourably reviewed in the press, and also toured all over the UK, Europe, Japan and appeared at SXSW in the United States.

The vocalist, James Snider, now goes by the artist name of "WinterKid" and posts tracks on his SoundCloud page.

== Members ==
- James Snider - vocals
- Tom Downer - bass guitar, banjo, mandolin, ukulele and guitar
- Bradley Osborne - guitar, violin and vocals
- Chris Muldoon - drums
- Hannah Snider - organs and vocals

== Style ==
WinterKids' music can be described as folk-pop, yet also takes a partially art-rock style with use of organs and keyboards.

== Recognition and reviews ==
WinterKids has been recognised by several media outlets, including being named as "One of the 10 most promising British acts of 2007" by the New York Daily News.

Their limited release album, Memoirs was reviewed well by Pitchfork which said that it "recalls teenage heartbreak with good cheer and a measure of wit".

Spin magazine wrote that the group "replicates the energetic spirit -- and heartache -- of their formative years." The First Coast News review was pointed: "The boy/girl vocals on Memoirs complement each other perfectly and make this album an addictive treat" and "practically essential."

After performing at the South by Southwest festival in Austin, Texas, and digitally releasing the WinterKids collection (with the same music as Memoirs), they released Memoirs through Columbia Japan and an EP called Wonderland through Tapete in Germany. They also received modest U.S. radio airplay as a result of the festival performance and a brief New York area tour and they reached the top 50 in the American College radio charts.

WinterKids also made the XFM playlist and had spot plays on Radio One.

== Television ==
Beginning in September 2009, WinterKids hosted the magazine-style television series Little House TV, based in the band's "Little House" home and production studio in Peaslake, Surrey, England. The band provides all the music for the series. With Inqb8r.tv, Howling Wolf Group and Sub.tv, the show is "produced by students for students" at Surrey University and is streamed to students on college campuses on the Freewire IPTV network and online at littlehousetv.com.

WinterKids appeared on Channel 4's The JD Set.

== Discography ==
- "I'm Not Used To You" (limited edition single)
- "Tape It" (limited edition single)
- Memoirs (limited edition promo album, Japan only)
- "Marzipan & Ribbons" (US iTunes only)
- "Wonderland" (limited edition 7" single)
- Wonderland EP (Germany only)
