= Maritime Hall =

Concert hall in San Francisco, USA

Coordinates: 37°47′11″N 122°23′34″W

The Maritime Hall is a historic 3,000-capacity concert hall in San Francisco's South of Market neighborhood that operated from 1995 through 2001 as a popular music venue and nightclub. It was located at 450 Harrison Street (at First Street) at the Sailors Union of the Pacific building.

== History ==
Maritime Hall Productions, a project of 1960s-era San Francisco musician and club promoter Boots Hughston, began producing rock concerts at the Maritime Hall in October, 1995. The venue was also known initially as the Family Dog, in tribute to an earlier production company and hippie commune of that name run by Chet Helms, former owner of the Avalon Ballroom. Over the next six years the company, renamed 2b1 Productions, produced 721 shows at the Maritime Hall, featuring many major current acts for heavy metal, Industrial, reggae, punk rock, African music, and other genres. Taking a cue from the Avalon and the Fillmore in days past, the company revived the art of the concert poster, commissioning designs from psychedelic artists Victor Moscoso, Stanley Mouse, Alton Kelley and Jim Phillips, as well as contemporary graffiti artists.

From the start the club struggled to operate a large independent venue in San Francisco. Maritime Hall had difficulty with bookings, advertising, and ticket sales, which it attributed to unfair competition from the city's premier music promoter, Bill Graham Presents. For example, Bass Ticket Outlet, the largest ticket retailer in the West Coast, refused to carry their tickets. In response, 2b1 opened its own network of 24 service charge-free outlets, with a homemade bar code printing system considered the first for a venue. Artists and talent agents who dealt with the club found themselves blacklisted from other venues. Nevertheless, they were able to attract such notable acts as Zero, The Dixie Dregs, Lee 'Scratch' Perry, Beastie Boys, Blackalicious, Latyrx, James Brown, Willie Nelson, Merle Haggard, Herbie Hancock, Black Uhuru, The Chemical Brothers, The Crystal Method, Motörhead, Los Van Van, Jay-Z, Eminem, Wu-Tang Clan, Papa Roach, Incubus, Ozomatli, Sublime, Bad Religion, Rammstein, Front Line Assembly, Siouxsie Sioux and the Creatures with John Cale, The String Cheese Incident, Sound Tribe Sector 9, Wyclef Jean, Goodie Mob, The Roots, Ol' Dirty Bastard, Kool Keith, Testament, and Galactic. The club also hosted raves, performance art, and charity benefits, and experimented with live internet broadcasts, and kept an archive of 24-track recordings and videotapes of nearly every performance.

In the late 1990s the club attracted the attention of notorious SOMA police captain Dennis Martel, who at the urging of residents moving into new upscale lofts in the area was orchestrating efforts to shut down all of the major nightclubs and performance venues in his precinct. After a series of raids and efforts to revoke their entertainment permit, all of which the club was able to resist in court, the police were finally able to obtain a one-month suspension of the club's liquor license after several patrons were caught smoking marijuana at one event. In the aftermath of these unpopular raids and at the urging of a grand jury, San Francisco eventually demoted and transferred the officer, and created an Entertainment Commission to replace the police department as the body to issue entertainment permits.

Ultimately the club succumbed to rising real estate prices during the dot-com bubble. It lost its lease in 2001 when the building owner raised the rent in expectation of renting the space out for business use. The production company continues to release and distribute approximately forty CD titles under the "Live from Maritime Hall" name.
