= Mudvayne discography =

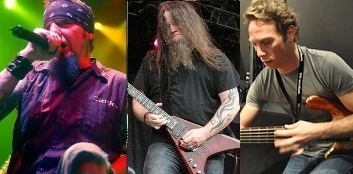
- Chad Gray, Greg Tribbett, and Ryan Martinie
- Studio albums: 5
- Extended plays: 1
- Soundtrack albums: 9
- Live albums: 1
- Compilation albums: 2
- Singles: 14
- Video albums: 2
- Music videos: 17
- Demos: 1

The discography of American heavy metal band Mudvayne consists of five studio albums, one live album, one compilation album, three EPs, thirteen singles, two video albums, and seventeen music videos.

Formed in Peoria, Illinois, the band became popular playing there in the underground music scene in the late 1990s, and released an extended play, Kill, I Oughtta (1997), and a successful debut album, L.D. 50 (2000). Mudvayne achieved worldwide critical and commercial success with The End of All Things to Come (2002), Lost and Found (2005), The New Game (2008), and Mudvayne (2009).

== Albums ==
=== Studio albums ===
List of studio albums, with selected chart positions and certifications
Title	Details	Peak chart positions										Sales	Certifications
Title	Details	US	AUS	AUT	CAN	FRA	GER	NZL	SCO	SWE	UK	Sales	Certifications
L.D. 50	Released: August 22, 2000; Label: Epic	85	33	—	—	—	—	—	—	—	—	US: 712,000+	RIAA: Platinum
The End of All Things to Come	Released: November 19, 2002; Label: Epic	17	44	—	69	125	—	—	—	—	107	US: 680,000+	RIAA: Platinum
Lost and Found	Released: April 12, 2005; Label: Epic	2	12	75	13	132	51	20	95	11	87	US: 599,000+	RIAA: Platinum
The New Game	Released: November 18, 2008; Label: Epic	15	42	—	—	—	—	32	—	—	—	US: 200,000+	
Mudvayne	Released: December 21, 2009; Label: Epic	53	—	—	86	—	—	—	—	—	—	US: 90,004+	
"—" denotes a release that did not chart.

=== Compilation albums ===
Title	Album details	Peak chart positions
Title	Album details	US
By the People, for the People	Released: November 27, 2007; Label: Epic	51
Playlist: The Very Best of Mudvayne	Released: October 18, 2011; Label: Epic	—

== EPs ==
Title	EP details	Peak chart positions
Title	EP details	US
Kill, I Oughtta	Released: 1997; Label: Self-released	—
The Beginning of All Things to End	Released: 2001; Re-release of Kill, I Oughtta	122
Live Bootleg	Released: September 30, 2003; Label: Epic	—

== Singles ==
=== 2000s ===
Title	Year	Peak chart positions							Certifications	Album
Title	Year	US	US Alt.	US Main.	US Pop	US Rock	CAN	CAN Rock	Certifications	Album
"Dig"	2000	—	—	33	—	—	23	—	RIAA: Platinum	L.D. 50
"Death Blooms"	2000	—	—	32	—	—	—	—		L.D. 50
"Not Falling"	2002	—	28	11	—	—	—	—	RIAA: Platinum	The End of All Things to Come
"World So Cold"	2003	—	—	16	—	—	—	—		The End of All Things to Come
"Happy?"	2005	89	8	1	91	—	—	—	RIAA: 2× Platinum; RMNZ: Gold	Lost and Found
"Forget to Remember"	2005	—	—	8	—	—	—	—		Lost and Found
"Fall into Sleep"	2006	—	—	4	—	—	—	—		Lost and Found
"Dull Boy"	2007	—	—	17	—	—	—	—		By the People, for the People/The New Game
"Do What You Do"	2008	— (Note: "Do What You Do" did not enter the Billboard Hot 100, but peaked at number 21 on the Billboard Bubbling Under Hot 100.)	13	2	—	21	—	44		The New Game
"Scarlet Letters"	2009	—	—	7	—	29	—	—		The New Game
"Scream with Me"	2009	—	31	3	—	16	—	42		Mudvayne
"—" denotes a release that did not chart.

=== 2020s ===
Title	Year	Peak chart positions		Album
Title	Year	US Hard Rock Digi.	US Main	Album
"Hurt People Hurt People"	2025	9	—	TBA
"Sticks and Stones"	2025	—	21	TBA

=== Promotional singles ===
Year	Title	Album
"Nothing to Gein"	2001	L.D. 50
"Determined"	2005	Lost and Found
"A New Game"	2009	The New Game
"Beautiful and Strange"	2009	Mudvayne
"Heard It All Before"	2009	Mudvayne

== Soundtrack contributions ==
Song	Year	Soundtrack
"Death Blooms"	2001	Ozzfest 2001: The Second Millennium
"Not Falling"	2002	Ghost Ship
"Death Blooms"	2002	Dragon Ball Z: Return of Cooler
"Dig (Everything and Nothing Remix)"	2002	Resident Evil
"World So Cold"	2003	MTV2 Headbangers Ball
"Determined"	2004	Need for Speed Underground 2
"Small Silhouette"	2005	Masters of Horror
"Forget to Remember"	2005	Saw II
"Forget to Remember"	2005	MTV2 Headbangers Ball: The Revenge
"Happy?"	2005	WWE Vengeance 2005

== Videography ==
=== Video albums ===
Title	Album details	Certifications (sales thresholds)
L(ive) D(osage) 50: Live in Peoria	Released: December 11, 2001; Label: Epic	RIAA: Gold
All Access to All Things	Released: December 11, 2003; Label: Epic	ARIA: Gold

=== Music videos ===
Song	Year	Director
"Dig"	2000	Thomas Mignone
"Death Blooms"	2001	Thomas Mignone
"Nothing to Gein"	2001	Thomas Mignone
"Not Falling" (Original Version)	2002	Joel Peissig
"Not Falling" (Ice Version)	2002	Dean Karr
"World So Cold"	2003	Christopher Mills
"Determined"	2005	Dale Resteghini
"Happy?"	2005	Lex Halaby
"Forget to Remember" (Version 1: Animated)	2005	Plates Animation
"Forget to Remember" (Version 2: Live)	2005	Frankie Nasso
"Forget to Remember" (Version 3: Film)	2005	Darren Lynn Bousman
"Fall into Sleep"	2006	Tim Burton
"IMN"	2006	Greg Watermann
"Dull Boy"	2007	
"Do What You Do"	2008	Frankie Nasso
"A New Game"	2009	Frankie Nasso
"Scream with Me"	2009	Frankie Nasso
"Beautiful and Strange"	2010	Frankie Nasso
"Heard It All Before"	2010	Frankie Nasso
