= By the People, for the People =

Compilation album by Mudvayne
- Released: November 27, 2007
- Recorded: 1999–2006, various locations
- Genre: Alternative metal; nu metal; hard rock
- Length: 76:44
- Label: Epic
- Producer: Dave Fortman

Mudvayne chronology
| Lost and Found (2005) | By the People, for the People (2007) | The New Game (2008) |

Singles from By the People, for the People
- 1. "Dull Boy" Released: October 23, 2007

Professional ratings
Review scores
| Source | Rating |
|---|---|
| Allmusic | 3/5 stars |

By the People, for the People is a compilation album by American heavy metal band Mudvayne. It was released on November 27, 2007 by Epic Records. The album features a track listing chosen entirely by the band's fans, with the band determining which version appears on the record (e.g. live, demo, acoustic), as well as two new songs, "Dull Boy" and a cover of The Police's song "King of Pain" (both produced by Dave Fortman). If the album was pre-ordered through the Sony Music Store, it was packaged with a free lithograph of the lyrics to "Dull Boy", signed and numbered by Mudvayne vocalist Chad Gray. If it was ordered after the disc was released, the lithograph was shipped approximately three weeks later and was neither signed nor numbered.

By the People, for the People is presented in a format where each song is introduced through a short interlude generally no longer than 30 seconds long, where Chad Gray debriefs the listener on surrounding facts such as where the song was recorded or performed live, or distinguishing a demo from an album version (obviously limited to in the case of demos).

The album debuted at number 51 on the U.S. Billboard 200 chart, selling about 22,000 copies in its first week.

== Track listing ==
All tracks are written by Chad Gray, Greg Tribbett, Ryan Martinie, and Matthew McDonough, except where noted.

| No. | Title | Writer(s) | Length |
|---|---|---|---|
| 1. | "Album Intro" | | 0:11 |
| 2. | "Dig" (Intro) | | 0:13 |
| 3. | "Dig" (Live) | | 4:28 |
| 4. | "Silenced" (Intro) | | 0:20 |
| 5. | "Silenced" (Demo) | | 2:59 |
| 6. | "Dull Boy" (Intro) | | 0:19 |
| 7. | "Dull Boy" | | 4:15 |
| 8. | "Death Blooms" (Intro) | | 0:23 |
| 9. | "Death Blooms" (Demo) | | 4:24 |
| 10. | "Fall into Sleep" (Intro) | | 0:25 |
| 11. | "Fall into Sleep" (Demo) | | 3:41 |
| 12. | "Not Falling" (Intro) | | 0:30 |
| 13. | "Not Falling" (Demo) | | 4:03 |
| 14. | "-1" (Intro) | | 0:19 |
| 15. | "-1" (Live) | | 4:49 |
| 16. | "Happy?" (Intro) | | 0:08 |
| 17. | "Happy?" (Demo) | | 3:43 |
| 18. | "(Per)Version of a Truth" (Intro) | | 0:28 |
| 19. | "(Per)Version of a Truth" (Demo) | | 4:41 |
| 20. | "World So Cold" (Intro) | | 0:05 |
| 21. | "World So Cold" (Live) | | 6:20 |
| 22. | "On the Move" (Intro) | | 0:08 |
| 23. | "On the Move" | | 3:55 |
| 24. | "Goodbye" (Intro) | | 0:13 |
| 25. | "Goodbye" | | 6:42 |
| 26. | "Skrying" (Intro) | | 0:13 |
| 27. | "Skrying" (Demo) | | 5:11 |
| 28. | "All That You Are" (Intro) | | 0:07 |
| 29. | "All That You Are" (Demo) | | 4:48 |
| 30. | "Forget to Remember" (Intro) | | 0:16 |
| 31. | "Forget to Remember" (Acoustic) | | 3:38 |
| 32. | "King of Pain" (Intro) | | 0:20 |
| 33. | "King of Pain" (The Police cover) | Gordon Sumner | 4:36 |
| Total length: | | | 76:44 |

== Personnel ==
- Chad Gray – lead vocals
- Greg Tribbett – guitars, backing vocals
- Ryan Martinie – bass
- Matthew McDonough – drums

Other personnel

- Dave Fortman – production

== Chart positions ==
Album

| Chart (2007) | Peak position |
|---|---|
| The Billboard 200 | 51 |

Singles

| Song | Chart (2007) | Peak position |
|---|---|---|
| "Dull Boy" | Hot Mainstream Rock Tracks | 17 |
