= WWF Tough Enough (album) =

Compilation album by Various Artists
- Released: September 18, 2001
- Genres: Alternative metal; nu metal; hard rock
- Length: 48:15
- Label: DreamWorks

Professional ratings
Review scores
Source	Rating
Allmusic	2/5 stars

WWF Tough Enough is the first 2001 soundtrack compilation album for the WWF Tough Enough television series, released by DreamWorks Records. The album features songs from various artists of the nu or alternative metal and hard rock music scene from the mid-1990s to early 2000s, with several of the artists being signed to DreamWorks. The album was created as a soundtrack compilation for the show of the same name.

== Track listing ==
No.	Title	Writer(s)	Artist	Length
1.	"Bodies"	Dave Williams; Mike Luce; C.J. Pierce; Stevie Benton	Drowning Pool	3:22
2.	"Smooth Criminal"	Michael Jackson	Alien Ant Farm	3:27
3.	"Awake"	Sully Erna	Godsmack	5:05
4.	"Bombshell"	Powerman 5000 (music); Spider (lyrics)	Powerman 5000	3:13
5.	"Beat The World"	Pressure 4-5	Pressure 4-5	3:01
6.	"Dead Cell" (Live) / "Tough Enough Theme" (Interlude)	Papa Roach; Christopher Lennertz (Interlude)	Papa Roach	4:07
7.	"Digital Bath"	Camillo "Chino" Moreno; Chi Cheng; Stephen Carpenter; Abe Cunningham	Deftones	4:13
8.	"Slammin'"	Joshua Todd; Jonathan Brightman; Keith Nelson; Devon Glen; Yugomir Lonich	Buckcherry	2:59
9.	"Dogtooth Violet"	Josh Lyons	Big Mother Thruster	4:03
10.	"Superstar"	Josey Scott	Saliva	4:03
11.	"Drive Away"	Johnny Heatley (music); Sarah Reitkopp (lyrics)	Halfcocked	3:09
12.	"Stupify" (Live from The Palladium)	Disturbed	Disturbed	4:51
13.	"Dig"	Matt McDonough; Greg Tribbett; Ryan Martinie; Chad Gray	Mudvayne	2:42

== Personnel ==
- Michael Ostin - Executive Producer
- Deftones - Performer
- Saliva - Performer
- Debbie Reinberg - Music Business Affairs
- Godsmack - Performer
- Buckcherry - Performer
- Disturbed - Performer
- Papa Roach - Performer
- Mudvayne - Performer
- Alien Ant Farm - Performer
- Ron Handler - Executive Producer
- Tom Baker - Mastering

== See also ==
- Music in professional wrestling
