= Scarlet Letters (song) =

Single by Mudvayne

from the album The New Game
- Released: March 9, 2009
- Recorded: 2007–2008
- Length: 3:56
- Label: Epic
- Songwriters: Chad Gray, Greg Tribbett, Ryan Martinie and Matthew McDonough
- Producers: Mudvayne, Dave Fortman

Mudvayne singles chronology
"Do What You Do" (2008)	"Scarlet Letters" (2009)	"Beautiful and Strange" (2009)

"Scarlet Letters" is the seventh track and third single released from the 2008 album The New Game by American band Mudvayne. It was released only as a radio single.

== Personnel ==
- Chad Gray − vocals
- Greg Tribbett − guitars, background vocals
- Ryan Martinie − bass
- Matthew McDonough − drums
- Dave Fortman − producer, mixing

== Charts ==
Chart (2009)	Peak position
U.S. Billboard Mainstream Rock Tracks	7
U.S. Billboard Rock Songs	29
