= Nothing to Gein =

2001 single by Mudvayne

Single by Mudvayne

from the album L.D. 50
- Released: 2001
- Studio: The Warehouse Studio (Vancouver)
- Genre: Nu metal, alternative metal
- Length: 5:29 (album version); 4:15 (radio edit)
- Label: Epic
- Songwriter(s): Chad Gray, Ryan Martinie, Greg Tribbett, Matt McDonough
- Producer(s): GGGarth, Mudvayne

Mudvayne singles chronology
"Death Blooms" (2000)	"Nothing to Gein" (2001)	"Not Falling" (2002)

"Nothing to Gein" is a song by American metal band Mudvayne. It was released as the third single from their debut album L.D. 50, and was written during the last days of the album's recording. The song is inspired by American murderer Ed Gein.

== Music and lyrics ==
During the songwriting process, the band members paired riffs with lyrics based on what Matthew McDonough referred to as "number symbolism". According to McDonough, while he and Chad Gray wrote the lyrics to "Nothing to Gein", Greg Tribbett performed a riff which alternated in bars of four and five. Because the number nine is a lunar number, McDonough felt that the riff would fit the song's lyrics, which referred to murderer and grave robber Ed Gein, whose actions McDonough associated with nighttime activity.

== Track listing ==
No.	Title	Length
1.	"Nothing to Gein" (album version)	5:29
2.	"Nothing to Gein" (radio edit)	4:15
