= Not Falling =

Single by Mudvayne

from the album The End of All Things to Come
- Released: October 23, 2002
- Recorded: 2002
- Studio: Pachyderm Studio, Cannon Falls, Minnesota
- Genre: Nu metal
- Length: 4:04
- Label: Epic
- Songwriters: Chad Gray; Greg Tribbett; Ryan Martinie; Matthew McDonough
- Producers: David Bottrill; Mudvayne

Mudvayne singles chronology
"Nothing to Gein" (2001)	"Not Falling" (2002)	"World So Cold" (2003)

"Not Falling" is a song by the American alternative metal band Mudvayne. It is the first single from the band’s second full-length studio album, The End of All Things to Come. It was Mudvayne's most commercially successful single chart-wise until "Happy?" in 2005.

The song got renewed attention when during the band's 2022 reunion tour in Tampa, Gray fell off the stage while performing the song. Gray himself noted the irony, and joked it was "amazing".

== Music and lyrics ==
"Not Falling" talks about being self-strong and not giving up. The song begins and concludes with heavier segments and screamed vocals, while its middle section is more atmospheric and melodic.

== Music videos ==
The song has three music videos: two official and one unofficial. The first video depicts the band being transformed into veiny creatures with white, egg-colored bug eyes and performing the song in a dark chamber. Additionally featured are images of parasites traveling through someone's bloodstream. The second video, directed by Dean Karr, features the members performing the song in a blizzard, notably without the costumes. The unofficial third music video appears on the DVD for the 2002 horror film Ghost Ship, in which the song was featured heavily. The video consists of a montage of clips from the film with the song played over.

== Track listing ==
Promo single

No.	Title	Length
1.	"Not Falling" (album version)	4:04
2.	"Not Falling" (radio edit)	3:56

7" vinyl single

Side A
No.	Title	Length
1.	"Not Falling" (album version)	4:04

Side B
No.	Title	Length
1.	"Not Falling" (radio edit)	3:56

Video single

No.	Title	Length
1.	"Not Falling" (music video)	3:42
2.	"The Making of Not Falling"	12:27

== In popular culture ==
- It is featured in the end scene and credits of the 2002 film Ghost Ship.
- It is featured in the video game Backyard Wrestling 2: There Goes the Neighborhood.
- It can be heard temporarily during the first episode of Fur TV. Other Mudvayne songs such as "Dig" and "Determined" are also heard in the episode.

== Charts ==
Chart (2003)	Peak position
US Alternative Airplay (Billboard)	28
US Mainstream Rock (Billboard)	11

== Certifications ==
Region	Certification	Certified units/sales
United States (RIAA)	Platinum	1,000,000^{‡}
^{‡} Sales+streaming figures based on certification alone.
