= Do What You Do (Mudvayne song) =

Single by Mudvayne

from the album The New Game
- Released: September 23, 2008
- Recorded: 2007–2008
- Genre: Alternative metal
- Length: 3:36
- Label: Epic
- Songwriters: Chad Gray, Greg Tribbett, Ryan Martinie and Matthew McDonough
- Producers: Mudvayne, Dave Fortman

Mudvayne singles chronology
| "Dull Boy" (2007) | "Do What You Do" (2008) | "Scarlet Letters" (2009) |

"Do What You Do" is the second track and first single released from the 2008 album The New Game by American band Mudvayne. It is their second-most successful single, reaching number two on the U.S. Mainstream Rock chart. Mudvayne announced in an interview on Fuse's No. 1 Countdown that "Do What You Do" will have a video.

== Personnel ==
- Chad Gray − vocals
- Greg Tribbett − guitars, background vocals
- Ryan Martinie − bass
- Matthew McDonough − drums
- Dave Fortman − producer, mixing

== Charts ==
=== Weekly charts ===
Weekly chart performance for "Do What You Do"
| Chart (2008–2009) | Peak position |
|---|---|
| Canada Rock (Billboard) | 44 |
| US Bubbling Under Hot 100 (Billboard) | 21 |
| US Hot Rock & Alternative Songs (Billboard) | 21 |

=== Year-end charts ===
Year-end chart performance for "Do What You Do"
| Chart (2009) | Position |
|---|---|
| US Hot Rock Songs (Billboard) | 12 |
