= Dull Boy =

Single by Mudvayne

from the album By the People, For the People and The New Game
- Released: October 23, 2007
- Recorded: 2006–2007
- Genre: Alternative metal
- Length: 4:15
- Label: Epic
- Songwriters: Chad Gray; Greg Tribbett; Ryan Martinie; Matthew McDonough
- Producer: Dave Fortman

Mudvayne singles chronology
"Fall into Sleep" (2006)	"Dull Boy" (2007)	"Do What You Do" (2008)

"Dull Boy" is a single from American heavy metal band Mudvayne's 2007 album By the People, for the People, later included on the band's 2008 studio album The New Game.

== Lyrical themes ==
At the beginning of the song, Chad Gray repeats "All work and no play makes me a dull boy" four times, elevating his voice from a whisper to a scream with each repetition. This is a reference to The Shining. The band has stated in numerous interviews that Stanley Kubrick is Mudvayne's favorite director.

== Video ==
For the video, the band hosted a green screen contest online, in which they recorded themselves in a green screen filter and uploaded it to their website, so that fans could create their own version of the video.

== Track listing ==
CD single

No.	Title	Length
1.	"Dull Boy" (Radio Edit)	4:01
2.	"Dull Boy" (Album Version)	4:17

Digital single

No.	Title	Length
1.	"Dull Boy" (Radio Edit)	4:01
2.	"Dig" (Instrumental)	2:47

== Charts ==
Chart (2007)	Peak position
US Mainstream Rock (Billboard)	17
