= Forget to Remember =

Single by Mudvayne

from the album Lost and Found and Saw II: Original Motion Picture Soundtrack
- Released: July 26, 2005
- Recorded: 2004
- Genre: Alternative metal
- Length: 3:36
- Label: Epic
- Songwriters: Chad Gray; Greg Tribbett; Ryan Martinie; Matthew McDonough
- Producer: Dave Fortman

Mudvayne singles chronology
"Happy?" (2005)	"Forget to Remember" (2005)	"Fall into Sleep" (2006)

Alternative cover

"Forget to Remember" is a song by American heavy metal band Mudvayne and the third single from their 2005 album Lost and Found. The song was featured in the film Saw II, which helped gain the band considerable mainstream popularity. It was also featured on 2006's MTV2 Headbanger Ball CD. There is an acoustic version of the song on By the People, for the People.

== Music video ==
The music video begins with lead singer Chad Gray walking through a house when he hears a metallic clanging and turns around to investigate. He turns around again to find a pig-masked Amanda Young. The camera then fades out and Jigsaw's voice can then be heard saying: "I want to play a game." Gray then awakens to find himself along with the rest of the band in a bunker with a timer of 3 minutes and 30 seconds. The timer starts and the band begins to perform. The music video ends with the timer running out as the song concludes, supposedly killing them.

In September 2005, the band met with film director Darren Lynn Bousman, whose film Saw II was in production and would feature this single. Bousman showed them the scene at the beginning the movie with police informant Michael cutting his own eye out of his skull to retrieve a key in order to free himself from a spike-filled mask locked around his neck. Gray told Bousman about the conversation at Bob's Big Boy two years earlier, and Bousman revealed that he holds his production meetings at the restaurant, and that Saw II had been based on a screenplay Bousman wrote years earlier. Gray appeared in a small role in the film, and Bousman directed the music video for "Forget to Remember", which featured clips from the film and performance footage shot on one of the film's sets.

== Charts ==
=== Weekly charts ===
Weekly chart performance for "Forget to Remember"
Chart (2005)	Peak position
US Mainstream Rock (Billboard)	8

=== Year-end charts ===
Year-end chart performance for "Forget to Remember"
Chart (2005)	Position
US Mainstream Rock Tracks (Billboard)	34
