= World So Cold (Mudvayne song) =

Single by Mudvayne

from the album The End of All Things to Come
- Released: May 20, 2003
- Recorded: 2002
- Studio: Pachyderm Studio, Cannon Falls, Minnesota
- Genre: Nu metal
- Length: 5:41
- Label: Epic
- Songwriter(s): Chad Gray; Greg Tribbett; Ryan Martinie; Matthew McDonough
- Producer(s): David Bottrill; Mudvayne

Mudvayne singles chronology
"Not Falling" (2002)	"World So Cold" (2003)	"Determined" (2005)

"World So Cold" is a song by American heavy metal band Mudvayne. It is the final single from the band's 2002 album, The End of All Things to Come. The song is very different from the rest of the band's work, being much more mellow while building intensity during the song's bridge and ending. Its lyrics take on a saddened and deeply personal tone in their sense of resentment toward society.

== Music video ==
A music video was produced for the single. It features the band performing in a room filled with what appears to be cardboard cut-outs of people. The video was shot in Toronto, Canada. It was directed by Christopher Mills of Toronto-based Revolver Films, who had previously directed the video for PDA by indie rock band Interpol.

== Track listing ==
No.	Title	Length
1.	"World So Cold" (radio edit)	4:09
2.	"World So Cold" (album version)	5:36

== Charts ==
Chart (2003)	Peak position
US Mainstream Rock (Billboard)	16
