= Mudvayne (album) =

- Cover art when seen under a blacklight

Studio album by Mudvayne
- Released: December 18, 2009
- Recorded: Summer 2008
- Studios: Balance Production Studios (Mandeville, Louisiana); Sonic Ranch Recording Studios (Tornillo, Texas)
- Genres: Nu metal, alternative metal
- Length: 48:17
- Label: Epic
- Producers: Dave Fortman; Jeremy Parker; Mudvayne

Mudvayne chronology
The New Game (2008)	Mudvayne (2009)

Singles from Mudvayne
- 1. "Beautiful and Strange" Released: October 7, 2009; 2. "Heard It All Before" Released: November 10, 2009; 3. "Scream with Me" Released: November 17, 2009

Mudvayne is the fifth studio album by American heavy metal band Mudvayne, released through Epic Records on December 18, 2009 in Germany and December 21, 2009 in North America. It was the band's final album before entering an eleven-year hiatus in 2010. The material from the album was recorded simultaneously with the material that appeared on The New Game. "Beautiful and Strange", a single from the band, was made available for streaming on the band's website and MySpace page on October 7, 2009. There was no tour to support the album, which had little promotion and sales were also weak.

== Production ==
Following the release of Lost and Found in 2005, Chad Gray and Greg Tribbett formed the heavy metal supergroup Hellyeah. They released their self-titled album in 2007. The following year Mudvayne released their fourth album The New Game to lukewarm reviews. Chad Gray has said "I love being in two bands. I really do. You get to explore both sides of yourself. I think everybody has this severed half. The kind [that] co-exists outside of your work. I was able to kind of climb into that skin."

The album was produced by Jeremy Parker and David Fortman.

Jeremy is amazing. We've done three records with him. He's phenomenal. He's great. One of the initial reasons why I wanted Dave to do 'Lost and Found' is because Dave doesn't -- like a lot of producers – hear their sound crossing over into a lot of different bands. With Dave and now Jeremy I think they allow the band to sound like the band.

— Chad Gray

== Musical style ==
The album's style has mainly been described by critics as nu metal. Phil Freeman of AllMusic believes that the album is heavier than the band's previous album, The New Game, and has compared its sound to Tool and Linkin Park.

== Release ==
On October 7, Mudvayne revealed a new song, "Beautiful and Strange". The song creates a mix of styles used in The New Game and older albums as well. It was also revealed that a single from the album, "Scream with Me", would begin receiving airplay on November 17, 2009; however, a week before, it premiered on Noisecreep at 12:01 AM. Another song, "Heard It All Before" was made available for streaming. On November 10, iTunes released a three-song set from the new album, titled Mudvayne - EP, with the songs "Beautiful and Strange", "Scream with Me", and "Heard It All Before". A digital download of the full album was released on December 7, 2009 to those who pre-ordered the album.

The album was released through Epic Records on December 18, 2009 in Germany and three days later in North America. The album art was printed entirely in blacklight-reactive ink, including the cover and liner notes, that can only be seen when under a blacklight. The cover art design was created by tattoo artist Paul Booth. Booth commented on the art: "This project has been absolutely killer to work on! The whole black light concept was totally experimental and quite the challenge, so of course, as an artist, I was drawn to it like a moth to a bugzapper. I am happy to see bands focusing more energy on their album art... something I thought the Internet had killed.

Mudvayne considers their second studio album, The End of All Things to Come, to be the band's "black album". For the release of their self-titled album, the band hoped to create their "white album", which would be reflected through the cover art. Without a blacklight present, the entire album packaging appears to be blank white paper.

There are different release editions of Mudvayne available; a standard edition, vinyl edition, deluxe and super deluxe edition. All release editions feature blacklight-reactive ink, and the super deluxe edition is only available through Mudvayne's online store.

Features	Release edition			
Features	Standard	Vinyl	Deluxe	Super Deluxe
Blacklight-reactive artwork	Yes	Yes	Yes	Yes
Special blacklight-reactive packaging	No	No	Yes	Yes
Album on CD	Yes	No	Yes	Yes
Album on glow-in-the-dark vinyl	No	Yes	No	Yes
LED, keychain-sized blacklight	No	No	Yes	Yes
24-inch blacklight	No	No	No	Yes
A blacklight-reactive sticker and poster	No	No	No	Yes
Quantity	N/A	N/A	100,000	1,000

== Reception ==
Professional ratings
Aggregate scores
Source	Rating
Metacritic	53/100
Review scores
Source	Rating
AllMusic	2.5/5 stars
Fangoria	3/4 stars
Consequence of Sound	3/5 stars
411mania	7.5/10 stars
Spin	2.5/5 stars
Los Angeles Times	2/4 stars
Sputnikmusic	3/5 stars

The album received mixed to positive reviews from critics, with Metacritic giving the album a score of 53 out of 100.

The Boston Globe gave the album a mixed review, writing "Mudvayne's fifth studio album at times sound[s] clumsy." Another mixed review appeared in the Los Angeles Times, stating "Mudvayne has by and large returned to what it does best (or at least do frequently) on its new self-titled album."

Phil Freeman of AllMusic gave the album a two-and-a-half star rating and wrote in his review "There are some surprises on Mudvayne, like a surprisingly Slash-like guitar solo on 'Closer' and the death metal intro to the Slipknot-esque 'I Can't Wait,' but too much of it is more of the same from the band."

Spin gave the album a mixed review, writing "These guys once flailed like a future-prog version of Slipknot (whose Shawn Crahan served as executive producer on L.D. 50), but now their doomy riff-o-rama comes equipped with mellow-bellow butt-rock choruses."

The album debuted at No. 54 on the Billboard 200, selling around 34,000 copies. However, the next week it peaked at No. 53 but the sales dropped 59% and only 14,000 copies were sold.

== Track listing ==
All tracks are written by Chad Gray, Greg Tribbett, Ryan Martinie and Matthew McDonough.

No.	Title	Length
1.	"Beautiful and Strange"	5:05
2.	"1000 Mile Journey"	5:56
3.	"Scream with Me"	2:52
4.	"Closer"	3:21
5.	"Heard It All Before"	6:05
6.	"I Can't Wait"	3:03
7.	"Beyond the Pale"	4:47
8.	"All Talk"	2:52
9.	"Out to Pasture"	5:47
10.	"Burn the Bridge"	3:36
11.	"Dead Inside"	4:55
Total length:		48:17

== Personnel ==
Mudvayne

- Chad Gray − vocals
- Greg Tribbett − guitars
- Ryan Martinie − bass
- Matthew McDonough − drums

Production and design

- Jeremy "Stacks" Parker − production, engineer
- Dave Fortman – production, mixing
- Charles Godfrey – engineer
- Asim Ali – engineer
- Drew Vonderhaar – assistant engineer
- MjDawn – audio manipulation
- Ted Jensen – mastering
- Paul Booth − art direction and design

== Charts ==
Chart performance for Mudvayne
Chart (2010)	Peak position
Canadian Albums (Nielsen SoundScan)	86
US Billboard 200	53
US Top Alternative Albums (Billboard)	5
US Top Hard Rock Albums (Billboard)	3
US Top Rock Albums (Billboard)	10
