= Kill, I Oughtta =

EP by Mudvayne
- Released: 1997
- Recorded: 1997
- Venues: Inn Cahoots, Austin, Texas (live tracks)
- Studios: Sinewave Studios, Bloomington, Illinois
- Genres: Nu metal; alternative metal
- Length: 31:04
- Producer: Mudvayne

Mudvayne chronology
Kill, I Oughtta (1997)	L.D. 50 (2000)

The Beginning of All Things to End
- 2001 reissue

Kill, I Oughtta is the debut extended play of American heavy metal band Mudvayne. It was self-released by the band in 1997. In 2001, the EP was reissued by Epic Records under the title The Beginning of All Things to End. The reissue featured, as additional tracks, remixes of "Dig", and "L.D. 50", a 17-minute sound collage which originally appeared as interludes on that album. It is the only release by Mudvayne to have any participation from original bassist Shawn Barclay.

== Music and lyrics ==
According to Matthew McDonough, the EP was "thrown together" for the band's fans. It consists of five studio tracks originally intended for a demo, and three live tracks. No studio versions exist for the three live tracks "I.D.I.O.T.", "Central Disposal" and "Coal". The sound of Kill, I Oughtta is different from that of later Mudvayne albums. AllMusic reviewer Bradley Torreano wrote that "The songs are reminiscent of '90s alternative metal groups like Mind Funk and Paw".

== Reception ==
Professional ratings
Review scores
Source	Rating
AllMusic	3/5 stars
Martin Charles Strong	6/10 stars

Torreano gave the EP a favorable review, writing that it was "as good as L.D. 50, if not better". The Beginning of All Things to End was selected as an "album pick" by the website. In The Essential Rock Discography, Martin Charles Strong gave the EP six out of ten stars.

== Legacy ==
Kill, I Oughtta was issued by Epic Records under the title The Beginning of All Things to End on November 20, 2001, which features three bonus tracks, including remixes of "Dig", and "L.D. 50", a 17-minute sound collage which originally appeared as interludes on the album of the same name. The Beginning of All Things to End was repackaged with L.D. 50 in a budget priced reissue on August 30, 2011. These albums, plus The End of All Things to Come, were repackaged as part of the budget priced reissue series "Original Album Classics" in 2012.

== Track listing ==
All tracks are written by Mudvayne (Chad Gray, Greg Tribbett, Matthew McDonough and Shawn Barclay).

Kill, I Oughtta
No.	Title	Length
1.	"Poop Loser"	1:22
2.	"Seed"	3:28
3.	"Cultivate"	4:19
4.	"Some Assembly Required"	2:48
5.	"I.D.I.O.T." (Live)	3:39
6.	"Central Disposal" (Live)	3:18
7.	"Coal" (Live): "Coal" (Live); (Silence); "Fear"	12:05: 5:04; 2:09; 4:52
Total length:		31:04

Notes

- "Coal" ends at 5:04, and is followed by 2:09 seconds of silence. A hidden track begins at 7:14.

The Beginning of All Things to End additional tracks
No.	Title	Length
9.	"Dig" (Future Evolution Remix)	5:43
10.	"Dig" (Everything and Nothing Remix)	4:58
11.	"L.D. 50"	17:15
Total length:		57:04

== Personnel ==
All personnel credits for Kill, I Oughta adapted from the album’s liner notes.

Mudvayne

- Chad Gray – vocals; production
- Greg Tribbett – guitars; production
- Shawn Barclay – bass; production
- Matthew McDonough – drums; production

Technical personnel

- Erik Nelson – production, engineering
- Walt Niekirk – recording (5-7)

== Chart positions ==
Album

Chart (2001)	Peak position
US Billboard 200	122
US Top Internet Albums	117

Singles

Year	Single	Chart	Position
2001	"Dig (Future Evolution Remix)"	Canadian Singles Chart	23
