= Determined (song) =

Single by Mudvayne

from the album Lost and Found
- Released: January 2005
- Recorded: 2004
- Studio: The Plant Studios in Sausalito, California, U.S.
- Genre: Thrash metal
- Length: 2:40
- Label: Epic
- Songwriters: Chad Gray; Greg Tribbett; Ryan Martinie; Matthew McDonough
- Producer: Dave Fortman

Mudvayne singles chronology
"World So Cold" (2003)	"Determined" (2005)	"Happy?" (2005)

"Determined" is a song by American metal band Mudvayne. It is the opening track and the first single from their 2005 album Lost and Found.

== Music ==
The song contains elements of thrash metal and hardcore punk.

== Music video ==
The music video for "Determined" shows the band playing the song in front of a large group of moshing fans. It was recorded in New York City.

== Appearances in other media ==
The censored version of the song is featured in the soundtrack to Need for Speed: Underground 2.

== Live performance ==
Mudvayne performed the song live for the first time in early 2005 during a small clubs tour. It has since become a regular part of the band's setlist.

== Reception ==
Johnny Loftus of AllMusic called the song "one of Mudvayne's all-time strongest tracks". It also received praise from The Baltimore Sun.

The song was nominated at the 2006 Grammy Awards for Best Metal Performance but lost to Slipknot's "Before I Forget".

== Trivia ==
As seen in the studio recording, the song was originally titled "Fucking Determined", as seen on a lyric sheet.
