= Audiotopsy =

American metal band

- Origin: Peoria, Illinois, U.S.
- Genre: Alternative metal
- Years active: 2015–present
- Labels: Napalm; Megaforce
- Spinoff of: Mudvayne; Hellyeah
- Members: Billy Keeton; Perry Stern; James Vinson; Trevor Bodkins
- Past members: Greg Tribbett; Matthew McDonough
- Website: Audiotopsy on Facebook

Audiotopsy is an American alternative metal band from Peoria, Illinois, formed in 2015. Its current lineup consists of lead vocalist and rhythm guitarist Billy Keeton, lead guitarist James Vinson, bassist Perry Stern, and drummer Trevor Bodkins. The band previously included Mudvayne members Greg Tribbett and Matthew McDonough.

== History ==
The band formed in 2015 after Greg Tribbett left Hellyeah along with bassist Bob "Zilla" Kahaka.

The band's debut studio album, Natural Causes, was released on October 2, 2015, via Napalm Records. It was self-produced and engineered by Tim Laud. The tracks "Headshot" and "The Calling" premiered on Loudwire and Revolver respectively.

In September 2017 the band announced recording had begun on a second studio album, set for release in 2018. The band's second album The Real Now was released on November 2, via Megaforce Records. Two singles were released in promotion of the record, "What Am I" (September 7, 2018) and "War" (October 11, 2018). In 2021, Greg Tribbett and Matthew McDonough left Audiotopsy following to the reformation of Mudvayne. They were both replaced by James Vinson on lead guitar and backing vocals, and Trevor Bodkins on drums.

== Musical style ==
The band has been categorized in the media as alternative metal, nu metal, and post-grunge. Tribbett refers to Audiotopsy as 'progressive hard rock', though this tag has been disputed. In their review for Natural Causes, Ghost Cult Magazine wrote "On paper the idea of Tribbett and McDonough working together again seems awesome, but the angular and off-kilter Mudvayne rhythms are nowhere to be found here. The closest we get to those days is on 'Distorted' and 'Darken the Rainbow,' but even then it's more Lost and Found rather than L.D. 50. And that's fine because this is a new band and they're capable of producing their own interesting moments."

== Band members ==
Current

- Billy Keeton – lead vocals, rhythm guitar (2015–present)
- Perry Stern – bass, backing vocals (2015–present)
- James Vinson – lead guitar, backing vocals (2021–present)
- Trevor Bodkins – drums (2021–present)

Former

- Greg Tribbett – lead guitar, backing vocals (2015–2021)
- Matthew McDonough – drums (2015–2021)

== Discography ==
Studio albums

- Natural Causes (2015)
- The Real Now (2018)
