= Fall into Sleep =

Single by Mudvayne

from the album Lost and Found
- Released: 2006
- Recorded: 2004–2005
- Genre: Alternative metal; nu metal
- Length: 3:51
- Label: Epic
- Songwriters: Chad Gray; Greg Tribbett; Ryan Martinie; Matthew McDonough
- Producer: Dave Fortman

Mudvayne singles chronology
"Forget to Remember" (2005)	"Fall into Sleep" (2006)	"Dull Boy" (2007)

"Fall into Sleep" is a song by American metal band Mudvayne and the fourth and final single from their 2005 album Lost and Found.

== Music video ==
A video was made for the song. It is unique for being the first use of animation in a Mudvayne video.

The video depicts a family living in a suburban area. The son, one morning, goes to wake his father so they could go fishing, but the father receives a call to apparently go to work. The son is left saddened as his father leaves. On the way, the father experiences a nightmarish hallucination in which he sees mailboxes become creatures and ultimately crashes into a river. As he leaves his car, a metallic-robot fish promptly swallows him; once inside, the father is strapped to a table and is examined by a couple of extraterrestrial-like beings. The examination is interrupted when the metallic fish is caught, along with other fish, by a fisher boat. The fish are then taken to a factory, where the metallic fish is cut up and both the father and extraterrestrials fall out and into a can shipped to a market. Once there, the man's wife picks the very same can and takes it home. It's then revealed by this time that all this was just a bad dream the father was having; just as he wakes up, he smiles to his son, indicating that they will go fishing as the boy jumps in joy. As they both leave, the camera zooms in on the family's fishbowl – the fish has an extraterrestrial residing in the eye, implying that it wasn't a dream after all.

Screenshot from the music video

== Reception ==
Johnny Loftus of AllMusic criticized the song by calling it "meandering".

== Charts ==
=== Weekly charts ===
Weekly chart performance for "Fall into Sleep"
Chart (2006)	Peak position
US Mainstream Rock Airplay (Billboard)	4

=== Year-end charts ===
Year-end chart performance for "Fall into Sleep"
Chart (2006)	Position
US Mainstream Rock Songs (Billboard)	15
