= Death Blooms =

2000 single by Mudvayne

Single by Mudvayne

from the album L.D. 50
- Released: 2000
- Studio: The Warehouse Studio, Vancouver
- Genre: Nu metal
- Length: 4:52
- Label: Epic
- Songwriters: Chad Gray; Greg Tribbett; Ryan Martinie; Matthew McDonough
- Producers: GGGarth, Mudvayne

Mudvayne singles chronology
"Dig" (2000)	"Death Blooms" (2000)	"Nothing to Gein" (2001)

Music video
- "Death Blooms" on YouTube

"Death Blooms" is a song by American heavy metal band Mudvayne and the second single from their debut album, L.D. 50.

== Background and meaning ==
The song was written by lead singer Chad Gray about his grandmother and how she was being neglected by her family because she was getting old and nobody cared when she had an illness except Chad. She was also taking Chad to local choirs where he learned to sing. Betty Rae, Chad's grandma, died in 2005.

== Music video ==
The video for the song is directed and conceptualized by Thomas Mignone and is shot in two locations: At the abandoned Seaview Hospital located in Staten Island, NY (also utilized in the film Jacob's Ladder), where the four members are playing their instruments; and a seemingly mystic beach in a remote part of Malibu, CA, where an old, frail woman is going through the transition into afterlife, and is aided by a little girl (the younger version of the elder woman) and vocalist Chad Gray to pass into heaven.

== Track listing ==
No.	Title	Length
1.	"Death Blooms" (radio edit)	4:16
2.	"Death Blooms" (clean version)	4:52

== Charts ==
Chart (2001)	Peak position
U.S. Billboard Mainstream Rock Tracks	32
