= Cul-De-Sac (album) =

Studio album by V Shape Mind
- Released: September 9, 2003
- Recorded: at Armoury Studios and Greenhouse Studios
- Genre: Nu metal, alternative metal
- Length: 48:45
- Language: English
- Label: Republic Records/Universal Records
- Producer: David Bottrill

V Shape Mind chronology
Metric (2000)	Cul-De-Sac (2003)

Professional ratings
Review scores
Source	Rating
AllMusic	2.5/5 stars
IGN	8/10

Cul-De-Sac is the only album by American nu metal band V Shape Mind. It was released on September 9, 2003 through Republic Records/Universal Records.

Its first and only single, "Monsters", features vocals by Chad Gray of Mudvayne, who happened to be best friends with lead singer Brad Hursh. "Monsters" made its local radio debut late in the summer of 2003 and found moderate airplay throughout the remainder of the year, thanks to local radio station play. V Shape Mind toured with Powerman 5000 and the aforementioned Mudvayne, under a "radio station mini tour" in promotion of their debut. However, Cul-De-Sac proved to be the band's only studio album before disbanding in May 2004 due to being shafted by their label.

== Track listing ==
No.	Title	Length
1.	"Antithesis of Origami"	3:38
2.	"Glitches"	4:06
3.	"Monsters" (feat. Chad Gray)	4:32
4.	"Dangle"	3:53
5.	"The Taste of Vinegar"	3:32
6.	"Totally Different Head"	3:00
7.	"Peel the Rind"	3:58
8.	"Gravity"	3:34
9.	"Brakecheck"	3:16
10.	"Chameleon Wars"	3:35
11.	"That Cool Refreshing Drink"	6:06
12.	"Every Little Thing (E.L.T.)" (hidden track)	5:30

== Credits ==
- Brad Hursh – vocals, guitar
- Jeff McElyea – guitar, piano
- Vic Zientara – bass guitar, backing vocals
- Scott Parjani – drums
- Tim Montgomery – drums
- Torsten Hursh – keyboard, guitar, backing vocals

Production

- All songs written by Brad Hursh
- Produced, engineered, and mixed by David Bottrill
- Assistant engineering by Misha Rajaratnam at Armoury Studios and Gord Sran at Greenhouse Studios
- Mastered by George Marino at Sterling Sound

== Chart positions ==
Year	Single	U.S. Mainstream Rock
2003	"Monsters"	40
