= MTV2 Headbangers Ball: The Revenge =

Compilation album by various artists
- Released: April 11, 2006
- Length: 2:34:36 (U.S. Version)
- Label: Roadrunner

Various artists chronology
MTV2 Headbangers Ball, Vol. 2 (2004)	MTV2 Headbangers Ball: The Revenge (2006)

Professional ratings
Review scores
Source	Rating
AllMusic	3.5/5 stars

MTV2 Headbangers Ball: The Revenge is a double album compilation of metal music released in association with the MTV2 program Headbangers Ball. The CD includes 38 tracks, in excess of 2½ hours of music, from both established and up-and-coming artists. The track selection includes rarities, live performances, as well as tracks never before available.

Two versions appear to exist, with different track lists. The U.S. version has three British bands, while the European version has only one, Bullet for My Valentine.

== Track listing (US version) ==
Disc 1
No.	Title	Artist	Length
1.	"Before I Forget" (previously unreleased video mix)	Slipknot	3:37
2.	"Liar"	Korn	3:43
3.	"The Trooper" (live)	Iron Maiden	4:12
4.	"To the Threshold" (previously unreleased)	Hatebreed	2:51
5.	"Forget to Remember"	Mudvayne	3:34
6.	"Burn It Down"	Avenged Sevenfold	5:00
7.	"Vampire Heart"	HIM	4:46
8.	"A Gunshot to the Head of Trepidation"	Trivium	5:56
9.	"Now You've Got Something to Die For" (live)	Lamb of God	3:50
10.	"Wasteland"	10 Years	3:50
11.	"Guarded"	Disturbed	3:20
12.	"Through Struggle"	As I Lay Dying	3:58
13.	"Our Truth"	Lacuna Coil	4:04
14.	"It's Dangerous Business Walking Out Your Front Door"	Underoath	3:59
15.	"Blood & Thunder"	Mastodon	3:48
16.	"A Bid Farewell" (live)	Killswitch Engage	4:00
17.	"In This River"	Black Label Society	3:53
18.	"Kill to Believe"	Bleeding Through	3:57
19.	"Take This Life"	In Flames	3:35

Disc 2
No.	Title	Artist	Length
1.	"Nothing Remains"	Chimaira	5:36
2.	"Suffocating Under Words of Sorrow (What Can I Do)"	Bullet for My Valentine	3:35
3.	"Nemesis"	Arch Enemy	3:59
4.	"Severed Ties Yield Severed Heads"	It Dies Today	3:02
5.	"The Grand Conjuration" (edit)	Opeth	5:03
6.	"Liarsenic: Creating a Universe of Discourse"	Norma Jean	4:09
7.	"Hold Back the Day"	DevilDriver	4:15
8.	"The Worst Is Yet to Come"	Still Remains	3:50
9.	"The End of the World"	God Forbid	4:57
10.	"Burn"	Throwdown	3:12
11.	"The Latest Plague"	From First to Last	3:20
12.	"I'll Go Until My Heart Stops"	36 Crazyfists	3:50
13.	"Through the Fire and Flames" (edit)	DragonForce	5:01
14.	"Vulture"	A Life Once Lost	3:23
15.	"Devilution"	High on Fire	4:45
16.	"Sell Me Out"	Bloodsimple	3:38
17.	"When Everything Falls"	Haste the Day	4:12
18.	"A Trigger Full of Promises" (previously unreleased)	Walls of Jericho	3:49
19.	"Buried in Black" (previously unreleased)	Kingdom of Sorrow	4:05

== European version ==
The only differences between the US and European version are as follows:

- On disc one of the European version, "Carved Inside" by Soulfly has replaced "The Trooper (live)" by Iron Maiden.
- On disc two of the European version, "Slaves Shall Serve" by Behemoth has replaced "Through the Fire and Flames" by DragonForce.

== See also ==
- Headbangers Ball
