= On the Doll =

On The Doll
- Film poster
- Directed by: Thomas Mignone
- Written by: Thomas Mignone
- Produced by: Jeff Most
- Starring: Brittany Snow; Josh Janowicz; Theresa Russell; Angela Sarafyan; Clayne Crawford; Shanna Collins; James Russo; Eddie Jemison
- Cinematography: Nicole Hirsch
- Edited by: Michal Shemesh; Tim Silano
- Music by: Paul D'Amour
- Production companies: DOOM Incorporated; Jeff Most Productions
- Distributed by: New Films Intl; Peace Arch Ent; G-Machine; Your Half Media Group
- Release dates: October 2007 (Austin Film Festival); June 13, 2008 (United States)
- Running time: 102 minutes
- Country: United States
- Language: English

On The Doll is a 2007 American drama feature film directed and written by Thomas Mignone.

== Background ==
The film's title comes from the phrase "Show me on the doll where you were touched", often asked of young children who have been the victims of sexual abuse. The film covers multiple lives of victims and victimizers, sharing the pain of how early childhood traumas can continue throughout adult lives.

== Plot ==
Jaron (Josh Janowicz) struggles to work for sleazy publisher "Uncle" Lou (Marcus Giamatti) in order to settle the obligations of his friend Tara (Angela Sarafyan), who works in a peep show for Jimmy (Paul Ben-Victor). He meets Balery (Brittany Snow), a call-girl who wants to place an ad in Lou's paper. She seeks an accomplice to help her rob a regular client she particularly dislikes. Jaron decides to take up the offer himself. Meanwhile, Wes (Clayne Crawford) whores out his girlfriend Chantel (Shanna Collins) in order to make enough money to buy her an engagement ring just to shut her up about his lack of commitment. Wes gets violently upset when he discovers she's been performing lurid sex acts on her customers just to make the extra money he wants. Two intimately close high school girls Melody (Candice Accola) and Courtney (Chloe Domont) play flirtatious games with their teacher Mr. Garrett (Eddie Jemison) in order to improve their grades, without realizing the violent dangers their teasing could lead to.

== Cast ==
- Brittany Snow as Balery
- Josh Janowicz as Jaron
- Stephen Sowan as Tre
- Clayne Crawford as Wes
- Shanna Collins as Chantel
- James Russo as Janitor
- Paul Ben-Victor as Jimmy Sours
- Eddie Jemison as Mr. Garrett
- Marcus Giamatti as Uncle Lou
- Angela Sarafyan as Tara
- Candice Accola as Melody
- Chloe Domont as Courtney
- Ethan Cohn as Brian
- Nolan North as Charlie
- Theresa Russell as Diane
- Dave Baez as Rick
- Desean Terry as Police Officer

== Release ==
On the Doll premiered at the 2007 Austin Film Festival. It also showed at the Avignon Film Festival, the Fort Lauderdale Film Festival, the Cinequest Film Festival and the Oldenburg International Film Festival. It has a limited theatrical release in the United States on June 13, 2008. The DVD release includes commentary from director Thomas Mignone, behind-the-scenes featurettes, and deleted scenes.

== Reception ==
Christopher Null of Filmcritic.com wrote "Mignone does a remarkable job at taking what starts as a mild flirtation or tiptoeing into perversity and showing how baby steps can soon lead to full-on, downhill slides". He writes that of the many stories intertwined in the film, the "movie is surprisingly at its best in the story of the two teens", who flirt with a teacher played memorably by actor Eddie Jemison), when noting the "shocking transition" of two girls seen worrying about their grades riding with their teacher to a porn studio to be "crudely sized up for their value to the viewing audience". He offers that while the film tries to wrap everything up tidily, it "is perhaps the wrong approach for a movie about an industry with no happy endings". He concludes that the film is memorable "more for its performances than its plot", and that "this somewhat scrappy independent doesn't fade from the mind quickly".

Marina Antunes of Quiet Earth compares the film to David Slade's Hard Candy but opines that "Mignone's style is an interesting mix of saturated colours and unusual visuals. There is a feeling of the impending downfall which is wonderfully communicated through the set design. Mignone has a talent for capturing the ugliness in beauty, something which lends itself well to the story he is telling here." Remarking on Mignole's ability, Antunes summarizes "though On the Doll is a good first attempt at a full length feature, it doesn't completely work".

Gerry Putzer of DVD Talk compares the film with Paul Schrader's 1979 porn-world thriller Hardcore, in that the sex in the film is as "uniformly bizarre, degrading and joyless". He concludes that the film "deserves high marks for ambition", and that the actors do a "convincing job under first-time writer-director Thomas Mignone, whose structural adventurousness is intriguing."

Dennis Harvey of Variety wrote that despite flaws, Mignone's first feature "has delivered a fairly tight package that draws generally good performances from thesps in largely one-dimensional roles".

David Nusair of Reel Film Reviews writes that while Mignone "generally does a nice job of infusing the proceedings with an intriguing visual style, there's little doubt that the increasingly uneven nature of Mignone's screenplay proves detrimental to the movie's overall success". He notes that "Mignone's decision to employ a sprawling structure - replete with almost a dozen recurring characters - undoubtedly ranks high on the film's list of problems". He concludes by offering that Mignone's film "definitively established itself as a misfire that nevertheless might just signal the emergence of a promising new talent".
