= Happy? (Mudvayne song) =

Single by Mudvayne

from the album Lost and Found
- Released: February 15, 2005
- Recorded: 2004
- Genre: Nu metal
- Length: 3:37
- Label: Epic
- Songwriters: Chad Gray; Greg Tribbett; Ryan Martinie; Matthew McDonough
- Producer: Dave Fortman

Mudvayne singles chronology
| "Determined" (2005) | "Happy?" (2005) | "Forget to Remember" (2005) |

Music video
- "Happy?" on YouTube

"Happy?" is a song by American heavy metal band Mudvayne and the second single from their 2005 album Lost and Found. It was the theme song of WWE Vengeance 2005 and has been played as a commercial bumper track for The Jim Rome Show. "Happy?" was named both the No. 1 Headbangers Ball Video of 2005 and Billboard Monitor's Active Rock Song of the Year. The song held the No. 1 spot on the Billboard Hot Mainstream Rock Tracks chart for one week, and reached No. 8 on the Hot Modern Rock Tracks chart.

== Music video ==
The music video for "Happy?" begins with the band, dressed entirely in black, playing the song in a field full of flowers on a sunny day. But after the first chorus, the sky darkens and a tornado emerges, seemingly out of nowhere, trying to sweep up the band. The storm subsides suddenly at the end of the video, showing that Mudvayne is unharmed and well.

== Charts ==
=== Weekly charts ===
Weekly chart performance for "Happy?"
| Chart (2005) | Peak position |
|---|---|
| US Billboard Hot 100 | 89 |
| US Alternative Airplay (Billboard) | 8 |
| US Mainstream Rock (Billboard) | 1 |
| US Pop 100 (Billboard) | 91 |

=== Year-end charts ===
Year-end chart performance for "Happy?"
| Chart (2005) | Position |
|---|---|
| US Mainstream Rock Tracks (Billboard) | 3 |
| US Modern Rock Tracks (Billboard) | 24 |

== Certifications ==
Certifications for "Happy?"
| Region | Certification | Certified units/sales |
|---|---|---|
| New Zealand (RMNZ) | Gold | 15,000^{‡} |
| United States (RIAA) | 2× Platinum | 2,000,000^{‡} |
^{‡} Sales+streaming figures based on certification alone.
