= V Shape Mind =

American metal band

- Origin: Decatur, Illinois, U.S.
- Genres: Alternative metal, nu metal
- Years active: 1999–2004, 2018–present
- Labels: Republic/Universal
- Past members: Brad Hursh; Jeff McElyea; Vic Zientara; Scott Parjani (deceased)

V Shape Mind was an American nu metal band. They released one major label album in 2003 before disbanding the following year.

== History ==
V Shape Mind was formed in 1999 and toured the local Illinois metal scene, during which they self-released an EP titled Metric in 2000. The band was discovered by renowned producer David Bottrill, who got them signed to Universal Records.

The band released their debut album, Cul-De-Sac, on September 9, 2003. The single "Monsters" features vocals from Mudvayne's Chad Gray and received considerable radio play. Despite touring with such acts as Mudvayne and Powerman 5000, V Shape Mind struggled to gather any mainstream attention. Consequently, they have since broken up, pointing to difficulties with Universal Records as the key factor. They played their final show together on Thursday, May 6, 2004, at Lincoln Square Theater in their hometown of Decatur, Illinois.

== Members ==
- Brad Hursh – vocals, guitar
- Jeff McElyea – guitar, piano
- Vic Zientara – bass, backup vocals
- Scott Parjani – drums, percussion (died 2010)

== Discography ==
=== Albums ===
==== Studio albums ====
List of studio albums
Title	Album details
Cul-De-Sac	Released: September 9, 2003; Label: Republic; Formats: CD

=== Extended plays ===
List of extended plays
Title	EP details
Metric	Released: 2000; Label: Diet Black; Formats: CD

=== Singles ===
List of singles, with selected chart positions, showing year released and album name
Title	Year	Peak chart positions	Album
Title	Year	US Main. Rock	Album
"Monsters" (featuring Chad Gray)	2003	40	Cul-De-Sac
