= Math metal =

Math metal may refer to:

- Mathcore, a dissonant fusion of extreme metal and hardcore punk characterized by the use of odd time signatures and rhythmic patterns
- Math rock, a style of rock characterized by the use of odd time signatures and rhythmic patterns
- Djent, a style of progressive metal, named for an onomatopoeia for the distinctive high-gain, distorted, palm-muted, low-pitch guitar sound
