= Shanna Collins =

American actress (born 1980s)

- Born: 1982 or 1983 (age 42–43)
- Occupation: Actor
- Years active: 2004–2020

Shanna Collins (born 1982 or 1983) is an American former actress. She has primarily appeared in one-off guest roles on American television series. Her last appearance was in the 2020 film, Anastasia: Once Upon a Time.

== Early life ==
Collins was born in Texas in 1982 or 1983.

== Career ==
Collins's first appearance was as a guest in an episode of the series Medical Investigation. She continued to appear in guest roles in single episodes of various television series, though she did have a recurring role (five episodes) in one season of the ABC Family series, Wildfire (2005), and was part of the main cast of the short-lived CBS series, Swingtown (2008).

== Filmography ==
=== Film ===
Year	Title	Role	Notes
2005	Chandler Hall	Adrianna	
2007	Sublime	Chloe	Direct-to-video
2007	On the Doll	Chantel	
2008	Loaded	Jaime	
2008	The Haunting of Molly Hartley	Alexis White	
2010	In My Sleep	Jennifer	
2012	Americans	Bartender	Short film
2012	Sassy Pants	Brianna	
2012	Breaking the Girls	Brooke Potter	
2013	Cat Power	Silvie Richman	Short film
2018	The Little Mermaid	Thora	
2020	Anastasia: Once Upon a Time	Lily	

=== Television ===
Year	Title	Role	Notes
2004	Medical Investigation	Rebecca Stevens	Episode: "Team"
2004	Veronica Mars	Pam	Episode: "Like a Virgin"
2005	Wildfire	Amber	Recurring role (season 1)
2005	Criminal Minds	Brandi Dreifort	Episode: "The Popular Kids"
2006	Malcolm in the Middle	Shana	Episode: "Morp"
2006	Close to Home	Francesca Stratton	Episode: "A House Divided"
2006	Medium	Amanda	Episode: "Blood Relation"
2006	Death Row	Lisa	TV movie
2007	Without a Trace	Jen	Episode: "Primed"
2007	Standoff	Hahna Keegan	Episode: "Road Trip"
2008	Swingtown	Laurie Miller	Main cast
2008	CSI: Miami	Jessica Davis	Episode: "Power Trip"
2009	Hawthorne	Lucy Meyers	Episode: "All the Wrong Places"
2009	Castle	Rina	Episode: "Inventing the Girl"
2011	Cinema Verite	Susan Raymond	TV movie
2013	CSI: NY	Wendy	Episode: "Blood Actually"
2013	Masters of Sex	JoBeth Prescott	Episode: "All Together Now"
2013	Major Crimes	Robyn Harris	Episode: "Pick Your Poison"
2014	Bones	Tabitha Coleman	Episode: "The Mutilation of the Master Manipulator"
2017	Comedy Sketch TV Time, Okay?	Various	Episode: "Never Have I Ever"
2017	NCIS: Los Angeles	Rebecca Larmont	Episode: "From Havana with Love"
