= Thomas Mignone =

American director and screenwriter

- Mignone on the set of feature film On the Doll
- Occupations: Director; writer; producer
- Years active: 2000–present

Thomas Mignone is an American feature film, streaming media, commercial, and music video director, and screenwriter. He is known for directing and writing the dark dramas On the Doll and Queen Of Manhattan and for directing conceptual music videos and live concerts for various hard rock and heavy metal artists.

== Feature films ==
Throughout 2024 Mignone directed and wrote Queen Of Manhattan, a feature film based on the life of Vanessa Del Rio as the World's First Latina adult film star and featuring actors Esai Morales, Drea de Matteo, Taryn Manning, David Proval, Elizabeth Rodriguez. Shane West, Josh Malina, Jesse Metcalfe and Dita Von Teese. It was selected as the Opening Night Film at the Portland Film Festival and won the Best Director Award. The film had its theatrical release on Sept 19, 2025 and its online streaming release on Oct 15, 2025.

In 2007, Mignone directed and wrote the feature film On the Doll starring Brittany Snow, Angela Sarafyan, Josh Janowicz, Candice Accola, Clayne Crawford, Shanna Collins, James Russo and Theresa Russell. The title refers to the phrase "Show me on the doll where he touched you", which is often asked of children who have been victimized by molesters. On The Doll premiered at the Austin Film Festival and was selected to screen at the 25th Anniversary of the Avignon Film Festival in France, Cinequest in San Jose, Ft. Lauderdale International Film Festival, and the 15th Annual Oldenburg International Film Festival in Germany. The soundtrack features new music from the Crystal Method, and an original score from founding Tool band member and bassist Paul D'Amour.

In October 2012, Mignone was one of several international filmmakers selected by the Cinequest Film Festival to direct and produce a film in concurrence with their partnership with the Tech Museum of Innovation. Additional feature film projects include Otep: Live Confrontation Concert Documentary, Slipknot: Welcome To Our Neighborhood, Satanika, a live-action version of the comic-book female anti-hero created by multi-platinum rock musician Glenn Danzig, and Ursa Minor. Mignone also helped develop the TV series The Deuce, which revolves around organized crime-controlled Times Square during the '70s and '80s. Upcoming film and streaming series projects for Mignone include The Last Fabulist In Brooklyn and The Dissident's Dream based on the extraordinary life of scientist and physicist Hrachya Hovsepyan who founded Nairi the first computer company in Armenia.

== Music videos ==
Mignone's music video for Mudvayne's hit song "Dig" won the first MTV2 Award and was the first music video to feature heavy metal artists with vibrant, brightly lit and color-saturated images, in sharp contrast to the dark, shadowy videos typical of the genre.

Mignone directed several videos for Slipknot, including "Wait & Bleed", which received a Grammy nomination. He directed the band's Spit It Out and paid homage to Stanley Kubrick's film The Shining. The video consists of conceptual imagery with band members portraying characters enacting iconic scenes from the film, with Joey Jordison as Danny Torrance; Shawn Crahan and Chris Fehn as the Grady sisters; Corey Taylor as Jack Torrance; Mick Thomson as Lloyd the Bartender; Craig Jones as Dick Hallorann; James Root as Wendy Torrance; Paul Gray as Harry Derwent; and Sid Wilson as the corpse in the bathtub. The video was initially banned from MTV for overtly graphic and violent depictions, including Corey Taylor's smashing through a door with an axe and the scene wherein James Root viciously assaults Corey Taylor with a baseball bat. Mignone and the band eventually re-edited a less violent version, which was subsequently aired on MTV.

Mignone's video for Sepultura's "Roots Bloody Roots" received the Video Of The Year Award from Kerrang! Magazine. It was filmed in Sao Paulo, Brazil, and was the first music video to contrast the hard rock group's intense performance with images of capoeira dancers, timbalada musicians, and other traditional Brazilian scenes.

In 1993 Mignone directed the band New Order in a live performance of their song "Regret" for Top of the Pops in Venice Beach, California. It was broadcast via satellite to the United Kingdom as part of an episode of the TV series Baywatch, featuring David Hasselhoff and various background actors and bikini-clad actresses dancing and playing on the beach.

In addition to hard rock and heavy metal artists, Mignone has also directed hit videos for alternative music artists such as Toadies, Tonic, Concrete Blonde, Lit, and others. He has directed hip hop and urban music videos for artists such as Kool Keith, Digable Planets, and Rahsaan Patterson. Mignone's videos are characterized by strong narrative conceptual storylines, elaborate and distinct color-correction palettes, and many times include feature film actors in lead roles, including Vincent Gallo, Denise Richards, Michael Rooker from the cult film Henry: Portrait of a Serial Killer, Peter Stormare, and Navi Rawat. Mignone lives and works in Los Angeles, and continues directing feature films and music videos. Recent videos include Existo Vulgore for Morbid Angel, Bullet Proof Heart for Miss Derringer featuring vocalist and acclaimed Los Angeles artist Elizabeth McGrath, the MTV #1 Buzz Clip video Lay Me Down for the Dirty Heads featuring vocalist Rome from the band Sublime With Rome, and Wings Of Feathers And Wax for American heavy metal supergroup Killer Be Killed featuring Soulfly/ex-Sepultura vocalist and guitarist Max Cavalera, the Dillinger Escape Plan co-vocalist and guitarist Greg Puciato, Mastodon bassist and co-vocalist Troy Sanders and the former Mars Volta drummer Dave Elitch. Mignone has also directed artists during live concerts such as MTV's Rock Am Ring, Ozzfest, Vans Warped Tour, Tattoo the Earth, and Dynamo Open Air festivals.

== Filmography ==
- 2000: After Dark Type O Negative European Live Concert Tour
- 2003: Ozzfest US Live Concert Tour
- 2005: Slipknot Rock am Ring Europe Concert Tour
- 2009: Otep Live Confrontation
- 2010: On the Doll (feature film)
- 2011: Slipknot Welcome to Our Neighborhood feat. Wait & Bleed, Surfacing, and Spit It Out
- 2016: The Deuce (streaming series)
- 2017: American Whore (streaming series)
- 2019: Splash the Glass (streaming series)
- 2022: The Latin From Manhattan (streaming series)
- 2025: Queen Of Manhattan (feature film)
