= Dig (Mudvayne song) =

2000 single by Mudvayne

Single by Mudvayne

from the album L.D. 50
- Released: March 6, 2000
- Studio: The Warehouse Studio, Vancouver
- Genre: Nu metal
- Length: 2:43
- Label: Epic; No Name Recordings
- Songwriters: Chad Gray; Greg Tribbett; Ryan Martinie; Matthew McDonough

Mudvayne singles chronology
"Dig" (2000)	"Death Blooms" (2000)

Alternative cover

Music video
- "Dig" on YouTube

"Dig" is a song by American heavy metal band Mudvayne, released on March 6th, 2000 as the band's debut single. It appears on the band's debut studio album L.D. 50 (2000). A music video was released for the song on April 10, 2001, and it later won the first ever MTV2 Award. It is also one of the band's most well-known songs, being certified gold in the United States. A live version of the song taken from the Tattoo the Earth tour appears on the live album Tattoo the Earth: The First Crusade. The song also appeared on the compilation album WWF Tough Enough. The song has also spawned an Internet meme known as "Brbr Deng" (the onomatopoeia of the opening bass riff), which bassist Ryan Martinie has expressed some ambivalence about.

In 2019, Joe Smith-Engelhardt of Alternative Press included the song in his list of "Top 10 nü-metal staples that still hold up today". In 2021, Eli Enis of Revolver included the song in his list of the "15 Greatest Album-Opening Songs in Metal".

== Music ==
Annie Zaleski of Spin said: "With its jackhammering drums, lurching-stomach bass line, and exorcism vocals, 2000’s 'Dig' feels like a car falling apart while traveling at 60 mph."

== Music video ==
The music video for the song won the MTV2 Award in 2001 and was directed by Thomas Mignone. It was one of the first music videos to feature heavy metal artists in vibrant, brightly lit and color-saturated images, in sharp contrast to the dark, shadowy videos typical of the genre. The award was to honor the best overall achievement by an act whose video premiered on MTV2 and received significant on-air rotation. A special edition DVD single was released featuring nine different camera angles, allowing viewers to switch between the various bandmembers' performances filmed during the video's production. The DVD also included a behind the scenes featurette titled "Dig a Little Deeper".

In 2018, the staff of Metal Hammer included the video in the site's list of "the 13 best nu metal videos".

== Track listing ==
Promo single

No.	Title	Length
1.	"Dig" (clean version)	2:42
2.	"Dig" (LP version)	2:43

Maxi single

No.	Title	Length
1.	"Dig" (radio edit)	2:43
2.	"Nothing to Gein" (radio edit)	4:15

Cassette single

Side A
No.	Title	Length
1.	"Dig" (radio edit)	2:43
2.	"Nothing to Gein" (radio edit)	4:15

Side B
No.	Title	Length
1.	"Dig" (album version)	2:43
2.	"Nothing to Gein" (album version)	5:29

== Charts ==
=== Weekly ===
Weekly chart performance for "Dig" by Mudvayne
Chart (2001)	Peak position
Canada (Nielsen SoundScan)	23
US Hot Mainstream Rock Tracks (Billboard)	33

=== Year-end ===
2001 year-end chart performance for "Dig" by Mudvayne
Chart (2001)	Position
Canada (Nielsen SoundScan)	95

2002 year-end chart performance for "Dig" by Mudvayne
Chart (2002)	Position
Canada (Nielsen SoundScan)	168

== Certifications ==
Region	Certification	Certified units/sales
United States (RIAA) Digital	Platinum	1,000,000^{‡}
United States (RIAA) Video single	Gold	25,000^{^}
^{^} Shipments figures based on certification alone.^{‡} Sales+streaming figures based on certification alone.

== Internet memes ==
The music video of "Dig" resurfaced during 2012 on YouTube, most notably when creators would dub funny noises over the scream Chad Gray does at the beginning of the song. The most viewed one of these videos is 'Most Brutal Metal Scream 2012', with over 15 million views. Another Internet meme created from this video was 'brbr deng', which refers to the prominent slapping and popping of bassist Ryan Martinie.
