= Lost and Found (Mudvayne album) =

Studio album by Mudvayne
- Released: April 12, 2005
- Recorded: January–December 2004
- Studio: The Plant Studios in Sausalito, California
- Genres: Alternative metal; nu metal; hard rock
- Length: 53:29
- Label: Epic
- Producer: Dave Fortman

Mudvayne chronology
The End of All Things to Come (2002)	Lost and Found (2005)	The New Game (2008)

Singles from Lost and Found
- 1. "Determined" Released: January 2005; 2. "Happy?" Released: February 15, 2005; 3. "Forget to Remember" Released: July 26, 2005; 4. "Fall into Sleep" Released: 2006

Lost and Found is the third studio album by American heavy metal band Mudvayne. The album was released on April 12, 2005. The album had major success in the U.S., debuting at number 2 and being certified platinum by the RIAA on February 20, 2026. It has sold about 1,000,000 copies as of August 2014 and is the band's most successful album to date.

== Production ==
After opening for Metallica on the band's Summer Sanitarium tour in 2003, Mudvayne spent the holidays recuperating before starting work on the album. The album was produced by Dave Fortman. The band chose Fortman because they felt he could combine the band's extreme elements.

"We've been extremely fortunate to work with some amazing producers. Garth Richardson captured the band's raw energy on the first record and David Bottrill gave our music a three-dimensional quality on the second record. For this record, we asked Dave Fortman to produce because we wanted someone who can bring both of those elements together into a sound that's brutal and beautiful."

— Chad Gray

Before heading to The Plant Studios in Sausalito, California to record the album, the band spent time with Fortman in pre-production. Vocalist Chad Gray said "I've found that those first few days are the most important when it comes to setting the album's tone and challenging the band about their goals and fine-tuning the arrangements for maximum emotional impact." The band rented a ranch in Northern California where they wrote and rehearsed songs for the album. They converted its multi-stall garage into a makeshift studio. As with the band's previous album, Mudvayne chose to isolate themselves to provide inspiration for their songwriting. Matthew McDonough stated "Establishing clear goals for each song has been the key to Mudvayne's quick results. It's a strange contradiction, but it can be very liberating to set limitations on creativity as long as you don't let those limitations define you. It frees up a lot of creative energy when you stop pulling an idea in fifty different directions and start pushing it in one."

By May 27, 2004, the band had finished writing 12 songs for the album. Chad, Ryan, Greg and Matthew left the ranch in Santa Cruz and went back to their respective homes in California, Illinois and Wisconsin. On June 12, 2004, the band reconvened to commence recording the album.

The song "Small Silhouette" was recorded during the Lost and Found sessions, with it later appearing on the soundtrack album to the Showtime series Masters of Horror.

== Music and lyrics ==
Lost and Found was described as a hard rock album by Consequence of Sound. It includes elements of thrash metal. The song "Determined" (originally titled "Fucking Determined") utilizes elements of modern thrash and hardcore punk, while the song "IMN"'s lyrics revolve around suicide, a recurring theme in Mudvayne's songs. The track "Choices" was described by Gray as "the eight-minute opus". It is to date the longest Mudvayne song.

The band sees the album as a return to the raw sound heard on L.D. 50, with guitarist Greg Tribbett saying in an interview with Rolling Stone magazine "Instead of being all slick, we're definitely going for a raw sound on this record. The last one was pretty smooth and the first record, L.D. 50, was raw, so we're kind of mixing it up a little bit." Matthew McDonough said he believed the music on the album would reflect a refinement of Mudvayne's complexly structured hard rock balanced against more melody than any previous album. Bassist Ryan Martinie added, "Our goal for the third album is to make music that pleases us because if it makes us happy then the rest will take care of itself."

== Promotion ==
Music videos were made for all four singles: "Determined", "Happy?", "Forget to Remember" and "Fall into Sleep". The music video for "Determined" shows the band playing the song in front of a large group of moshing fans. It was recorded in New York City. "Determined" was featured on the soundtrack of the video game Need for Speed: Underground 2 while "Happy?" appeared in the video game MX vs. ATV Untamed and was also used as the theme song for WWE's Vengeance. The song "Forget to Remember" was featured in the film Saw II.

== Reception ==
Professional ratings
Aggregate scores
Source	Rating
Metacritic	46/100
Review scores
Source	Rating
AllMusic	2.5/5 stars
Entertainment Weekly	B+
IGN	6.5/10
Melodic	2.5/5
PopMatters	3/10
Rolling Stone	2/5 stars

The album sold 100,000 copies in its first week of release.

Upon release, the album received generally mixed reviews, with Metacritic giving it a score of 46%. Some critics noted a perceived change in sound on the album aimed towards a more mainstream audience. The Kansas Wichita Eagle observed, "Success wasn't something the members of Mudvayne set out to achieve, but they won't spurn it. Since the quartet's arrival on the heavy metal scene in 1996, it has progressed from the fringes to the rock mainstream."

A positive review appeared in Entertainment Weekly, which wrote, "Weaving crystallized melodies into their signature rage clusters, the metalheads dip a toe in clearer waters without losing any of the grime."

Johnny Loftus of AllMusic praised the opening track, "Determined", writing in his review, "They nail it on opener "Determined"—one of Mudvayne's all-time strongest tracks, it's a fist-swinging blast of modernized thrash." However, he gave the album a mixed review, writing, "Lost and Found soon falls into the familiar, busting no-one-understands-me lyrics and matching moments of refreshing rawness to stretches of stereotypical 'corporate metal,' a non-genre that's risen up to accept loud rock refugees and the harder side of post-grunge. The energy in 'Determined' and 'Just' is sapped by the meandering 'TV Radio' and 'Fall into Sleep,' and ultimately Mudvayne gets lost between thrash and diluted Slipknot devotion."

Mixed reviews also appeared in Q, which said, "[Mudvayne] remain[s] spirit-crushingly average", Rolling Stone, which called the album "Syncopated sludge that will connect only with aging burnouts and the angriest of young 'uns" and Billboard, which wrote, "The album is, while not terrible, not very memorable, either."

PopMatters gave the album a negative review, writing, "Lost and Found is ultimately a pointless album, one that might have sold well six years ago, but comes across as drab and hopelessly passé today."

The song "Determined" was nominated at the 2006 Grammy Awards for Best Metal Performance but lost to Slipknot's "Before I Forget".

== Other releases ==
Demo versions of "Fall into Sleep", "Happy?" and "All That You Are", and an acoustic version of "Forget to Remember" appeared on the 2007 compilation By the People, for the People, which was compiled from selections voted for by fans through the band's website. The album versions of "Determined", "Fall into Sleep" and "Happy?" appeared on the compilation Playlist: The Very Best of Mudvayne in 2011.

== Track listing ==
All tracks are written by Matthew McDonough, Greg Tribbett, Ryan Martinie and Chad Gray.

No.	Title	Length
1.	"Determined"	2:39
2.	"Pushing Through"	3:28
3.	"Happy?"	3:37
4.	"IMN"	5:51
5.	"Fall into Sleep"	3:51
6.	"Rain. Sun. Gone."	4:35
7.	"Choices"	8:05
8.	"Forget to Remember"	3:35
9.	"TV Radio"	3:26
10.	"Just"	3:00
11.	"All That You Are"	6:11
12.	"Pulling the String"	5:05
Total length:		53:29

Japanese edition bonus track
No.	Title	Length
13.	"Goodbye"	5:07

== Personnel ==
Mudvayne

- Chad Gray – lead vocals
- Greg Tribbett – guitars, backing vocals
- Ryan Martinie – bass
- Matthew McDonough – drums

Additional personnel

- Dave Fortman – recording, production, audio mixing
- Jeremy Parker – audio mixing
- Mike Boden – assistant engineer
- Mauricio Serna – assistant engineer
- Kelly Liebelt – assistant engineer
- Tony Terrebonne – assistant engineer
- Ted Jensen – mastering at Sterling Sound, New York City
- Devun Fortman – additional vocals on "Choices"
- Erinn Fortman – additional vocals on "Choices"
- Leah Germinaro – additional vocals on "Choices"

== Charts ==
=== Weekly charts ===
Weekly chart performance for Lost and Found
Chart (2005)	Peak position
Australian Albums (ARIA)	12
Austrian Albums (Ö3 Austria)	75
Canadian Albums (Billboard)	13
French Albums (SNEP)	132
German Albums (Offizielle Top 100)	51
New Zealand Albums (RMNZ)	20
Scottish Albums (Official Charts)	95
Swedish Albums (Sverigetopplistan)	11
UK Albums (Official Charts)	87
UK Rock & Metal Albums (Official Charts)	7
US Billboard 200	2

=== Year-end charts ===
Year-end chart performance for Lost and Found
Chart (2005)	Position
US Billboard 200	129

== Certifications ==
Certifications for Lost and Found
Region	Certification	Certified units/sales
United States (RIAA)	Platinum	1,000,000^{‡}
^{‡} Sales+streaming figures based on certification alone.
