= The End of All Things to Come =

Studio album by Mudvayne
- Released: November 19, 2002
- Recorded: 2002
- Studio: Pachyderm (Cannon Falls, Minnesota)
- Genres: Nu metal; alternative metal; progressive metal
- Length: 52:22
- Label: Epic
- Producer: David Bottrill

Mudvayne chronology
L.D. 50 (2000)	The End of All Things to Come (2002)	Lost and Found (2005)

Singles from The End of All Things to Come
- 1. "Not Falling" Released: October 23, 2002; 2. "World So Cold" Released: May 20, 2003

The End of All Things to Come is the second studio album by American heavy metal band Mudvayne. Released on November 19, 2002, the album expanded upon the sound of the band's first album, L.D. 50, with a more versatile range of sounds, dynamic, moods and vocalization.

The band wrote the album's songs in less than a month, drawing inspiration from their self-imposed isolation during the songwriting process, and crafted a more mature sound which drew from jazz and progressive rock influences, as well as elements of death metal and thrash metal. The album's strong sales led to it being certified Platinum by the RIAA in 2026.

== Production ==
"On the first record we all played in our own little boxes, like we were playing to impress ourselves. Touring for so long taught us to listen to each other more and play off each other instead of playing over each other. Making that adjustment gives the new music a more rock feel and allows more room for the vocals and melody to shine." (Matt McDonough)

The album was recorded at Pachyderm Studios in Minnesota during 2002 with the producer David Bottrill, who had previously produced albums for groups such as Tool and Silverchair. The band had very little time to make the album, in contrast to the recording of the previous album, L.D. 50. The drummer, Matthew McDonough, said, "We had all the time in the world to write our first album, but for the second one, we had about a month. I'm amazed how quickly we came up with the material."

Vocalist Chad Gray said, "The making of The End of All Things to Come was an exercise in deadline management for the band. Since we were on the road for such a long period and didn't want to wait any longer than two years between albums, we didn't have a lot of time to create this record. We wrote and rehearsed for four months and then spent another four months to record and master the entire album. The pressure made us focus instead of fold." With the creation of the album's artwork, Mudvayne hoped to create the band's "black album".

== Musical style ==
MTV said The End of All Things to Come derives influence from several styles, including death metal, progressive rock, jazz metal and harmony-filled classic rock. AllMusic described the album sound as "standard-issue heavy metal thrash" similar to that of Metallica. MTV compared the album's style to groups such as King's X, Pantera and Tool, referring to the music as "multi-textured metal loaded with prog-rock shifts"

During the album's songwriting process, the band intentionally isolated themselves for inspiration. The album expanded upon the sound of L.D. 50 with a wider range of riffs, tempos, moods and vocalization. Matt McDonough described the songs on the album as "even weirder" than those on L.D. 50, and also believes the album is more mature.

The song "Trapped in the Wake of a Dream" has choruses written in 17/8, verses in 11/8 and a bridge that mixes both time signatures. McDonough said "If I hadn't pointed out which song was written in 17/8 I don't think most people would have noticed. It's a strange time signature but it works because it's smooth", while Gray added that it was the hardest song on the album to record.

== Reception ==
Professional ratings
Aggregate scores
Source	Rating
Metacritic	48/100
Review scores
Source	Rating
AllMusic	3/5 stars
Blender	2/5 stars
Entertainment Weekly	B−
Rolling Stone	2/5 stars
Spin	3/10

The End of All Things to Come was certified Gold by the RIAA in 2003.

Positive reviews came from Entertainment Weekly, which deemed it to be more "user-friendly" than L.D. 50, Launch.com, which said that "While the group attacks things with great velocity and singer Chad shreds his larynx at regular intervals, the always difficult follow-up album features actual melodies and mature textures that make the band's eventual transformation into a progressive rock band nearly inevitable" and MTV, which described the album as "a scarring blend of Pantera, Voivod and Tool, with a smattering of King's X".

The Daily News Journal also gave the album a positive review, writing, "The End of All Things to Come captures Mudvayne at a time when the band has found its voice and is hitting its stride with confidence."

Mixed reviews came from AllMusic, which wrote, "The musicians still churn out standard-issue heavy metal thrash à la Metallica to support Chad's nihilistic pronouncements, usually sung in an enraged howl," from Blender, which wrote, "The End is rather ordinary--severe, belligerent riffs and vocals that sound as though singer Chad gargles molten lava," and Rolling Stone, which wrote, "Enjoy the band's extraterrestrial makeover; it's far more amusing than the music." A negative review appeared in Spin, simply stating, "No."

== Track listing ==
All tracks are written by Mudvayne.

No.	Title	Length
1.	"Silenced"	3:01
2.	"Trapped in the Wake of a Dream"	4:41
3.	"Not Falling"	4:04
4.	"(Per)version of a Truth"	4:41
5.	"Mercy, Severity"	4:55
6.	"World So Cold"	5:40
7.	"The Patient Mental"	4:38
8.	"Skrying"	5:39
9.	"Solve et Coagula"	2:49
10.	"Shadow of a Man"	3:55
11.	"12:97:24:99"	0:11
12.	"The End of All Things to Come"	3:01
13.	"A Key to Nothing"	5:07
Total length:		52:22

Limited edition bonus DVD
No.	Title	Length
1.	"In the Studio"	9:07
2.	"Photo Shoot"	5:03
3.	"Downtime"	1:52
4.	"The Interview"	10:59
5.	"Goodbye" (audio only)	6:11
6.	"On the Move" (audio only)	3:55
Total length:		37:07

Special limited edition bonus CD
No.	Title	Length
1.	"-1" (live)	3:59
2.	"Not Falling" (live)	4:06
3.	"World So Cold" (live)	5:33
4.	"Dig" (live)	3:35
Total length:		17:13

== Personnel ==
Mudvayne

- Chad Gray – lead vocals
- Greg Tribbett – guitars, backing vocals
- Ryan Martinie – bass
- Matthew McDonough – drums

Production

- David Bottrill – production, engineer, mixing, mastering
- Brent Sigmeth – assistant engineer
- Aimee Macauley – art direction
- Nitin Vadukul – photography

== Charts ==
=== Weekly charts ===
Weekly chart performance for The End of All Things to Come
Chart (2002–2003)	Peak position
Australian Albums (ARIA)	44
Australian Heavy Rock & Metal Albums (ARIA)	4
Canadian Albums (Nielsen SoundScan)	69
Canadian Metal Albums (Nielsen SoundScan)	6
Dutch Alternative Albums (Alternative Top 30)	20
French Albums (SNEP)	125
UK Albums (OCC)	107
UK Rock & Metal Albums (Official Charts)	9
US Billboard 200	17

=== Year-end charts ===
2002 year-end chart performance for The End of All Things to Come
Chart (2002)	Position
Canadian Alternative Albums (Nielsen SoundScan)	192
Canadian Metal Albums (Nielsen SoundScan)	99

2003 year-end chart performance for The End of All Things to Come
Chart (2003)	Position
US Billboard 200	143

== Certifications ==
Certifications for The End of All Things to Come
Region	Certification	Certified units/sales
United States (RIAA)	Platinum	1,000,000^{‡}
^{^} Shipments figures based on certification alone.
