= L.D. 50 (album) =

2000 studio album by Mudvayne

Studio album by Mudvayne
- Released: August 22, 2000
- Recorded: October 14, 1999 – March 12, 2000
- Studios: The Warehouse Studio, Vancouver, Canada
- Genres: Nu metal; alternative metal
- Length: 68:32
- Labels: No Name Recordings; Epic
- Producers: GGGarth; Mudvayne

Mudvayne chronology
Kill, I Oughtta (1997)	L.D. 50 (2000)	The End of All Things to Come (2002)

Singles from LD.50
- 1. "Dig" Released: March 6, 2000; 2. "Death Blooms" Released: 2000; 3. "Nothing to Gein" Released: 2001

L.D. 50 is the debut studio album by American heavy metal band Mudvayne. Released on August 22, 2000, it is the band's first release on Epic Records, following the independently-released extended play Kill, I Oughtta. The album was co-produced by Garth Richardson and Mudvayne, and executive produced by Steve Richards and Slipknot member Shawn "Clown" Crahan.

The band's elaborate visual appearance resulted in increased recognition of the band, and L.D. 50 peaked at No. 85 on the Billboard 200. While initially receiving mixed reviews from critics on release, the album would gain praise over time for its technical and heavy style of music.

In 2018, readers of Revolver voted it as the fourth-greatest nu metal album of all time. In 2021, the staff of Revolver included the album in their list of the "20 Essential Nu-Metal Albums". In 2022, Eli Enis of Revolver included the song "Internal Primates Forever" in his list of the "10 Heaviest Nu-Metal Songs of All Time".

== Background and production ==
Mudvayne formed in 1996 in Peoria, Illinois. The band became known for its strong visual appearance, which included horror film-styled makeup. After independently releasing their debut extended play, Kill, I Oughtta, the band signed to No-Name/Epic Records. L.D. 50 was produced by Garth "GGGarth" Richardson and executive produced by Steve Richards and Slipknot member Shawn "Clown" Crahan. Epic Records initially chose to promote the band without focusing on its appearance and early promotional materials featured a logo instead of photographs of the band. However, the band's appearance and music videos increased recognition of the album.

According to the band, the production of the album was very hectic. Drummer Matthew McDonough reflected, "We worked around the clock, and some of the engineers we had with us literally went for days with-out sleep. It was very, very time-intensive. We didn't party. We were recording in Vancouver but didn't get to see the town-we were just there and we worked and that was it. It was very intense, and Garth ran a tight ship." Singer Chad Gray recalled, "Making the record was crazy. It was all about work. There were songs I left alone and didn't mess with until we were in the studio, which was not a smart idea considering the time and budget constraints we were under. I wrote 'Pharmaecopia' and 'Nothing To Gein' on our last night in the studio, before the tapes were sent to New York to be mixed. The pres-sure [sic] was insane."

== Music and lyrics ==
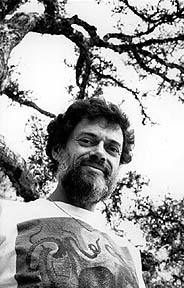
Several of the album's interludes feature excerpts from Terence McKenna.

L.D. 50 features a technical style of music which has been referred to by the band as "math metal", and by critics as nu metal, alternative metal, thrash metal, art metal and heavy metal in general. Spin magazine also described the album as having a "future-prog" sound. Mudvayne's musical style has influences of death metal, hardcore punk, jazz fusion, speed metal and hip hop.

Mudvayne has found additional inspiration from artists such as Obituary, Emperor, Mötley Crüe, Alice in Chains, Pearl Jam, King Crimson, Porcupine Tree and Metallica. However, the band has stated that they are not influenced by other metal bands. The album's first track, "Monolith", refers to Stanley Kubrick's film 2001: A Space Odyssey. The band were greatly influenced by this film during the making of L.D. 50.

During the songwriting process, the band members paired riffs with lyrics based on what Matthew McDonough referred to as "number symbolism". According to McDonough, while he and Chad Gray wrote the lyrics to "Nothing to Gein", Greg Tribbett performed a riff which alternated in bars of 4 and 5. Because the number 9 is a lunar number, McDonough felt that the riff would fit the song's lyrics, which referred to serial killer and grave robber Ed Gein, whose actions McDonough associated with nighttime activity. Gein's story grabbed the attention of McDonough and Gray as they were leafing through a book on murderers and true crime. Regarding Gein, McDonough commented, "It seemed so impossible [for Gein] to bridge the gap into mainstream society. I found that exciting that I could find humanity in him".

The album's title is drug-related and derives from the technical term 'Median lethal dose', abbreviated 'LD50', used by toxicologists to refer to the dosage of any given substance required to kill half (50 percent of) the members of a tested population. A sound collage entitled "L.D. 50", composed and recorded by drummer Matthew McDonough, appears on the album as a series of interludes. The complete piece appeared as a bonus track on The Beginning of All Things to End, Epic Records' reissue of the band's 1997 self-released EP Kill, I Oughtta. The album also features distorted audio clips voiced by American philosopher and psychonaut, Terence McKenna, who died around the time of the album's recording.

== Release and commercial performance ==
L.D. 50 was released on August 22, 2000. It peaked at number one on the Billboard Top Heatseekers chart and number 85 on the Billboard 200 and was certified platinum by the RIAA. The singles "Dig" and "Death Blooms" peaked at No. 33 and No. 32, respectively, on the Mainstream Rock Tracks chart.

L.D. 50 was rereleased just over eleven years after its initial release, on August 30, 2011, packaged with a reissue of their debut demo EP, Kill, I Oughtta, called The Beginning of All Things to End. Both L.D. 50 and The Beginning of All Things to End were later repackaged again, as parts of the Original Album Classics series in 2012, along with Mudvayne's second (The End Of All Things To Come), third (Lost and Found), and fifth (Mudvayne) albums.

== Critical reception ==
Professional ratings
Review scores
Source	Rating
AllMusic	3/5 stars
Blabbermouth.net	8/10
Drowned in Sound	8/10
Kerrang!	3/5 stars
Melody Maker	3.5/5 stars
Metal Hammer	8/10
Rock Sound	4/5 stars
Rolling Stone	3/5 stars
Martin Charles Strong	6/10 stars
Terrorizer	0/10

L.D. 50 received mixed to positive reviews from critics. Rolling Stone contributor Ben Ratliff gave the album three out of five stars. He noted the band's technical background, comparing the songwriting style to that of Nirvana and stating that the album's interludes are better than those of Slipknot. Blabbermouth.net writer Borivoj Krgin praised its technicality and heaviness.

AllMusic described the music as "hard to take seriously", noting that "the CD booklet, which contains an acknowledgments section as lengthy and gushy as what you'd find on a teen pop album. Can these guys giving thanks and love to family and friends be the same ones performing aggressive lockstep metal, spewing obscenities, and singing about suicide?" Exclaim! gave the album a negative review, stating that "Despite titles like 'Internal Primates Forever,' '-1,' 'Nothing To Gein,' 'Pharmaecopia' and '(K)Now F(orever)' nothing can improve this pathetic nu-metal drivel" and "The only redeeming quality to this record is the intrusive fretless bass sound that kind of sounds like Les Claypool's noodling." NME gave the album a negative review, describing the album as "An unholy stew, baby, a musical ebola" and that there were "far too many incidences of Rush-style mid-'70s ponce metal 'proper' singing. Think Yes. Think 'Stonehenge' by Spinal Tap. Think prog-rock bollocks, baby!" Nick Terry's review of the album for Terrorizer, which awarded no marks, read only: "No. Nonononono. NO. Come back, Coal Chamber, all is forgiven...".

Revolver put the album on their "10 Nu-Metal Albums You Need to Own" list, stating that "the album's prog-rock experimentalism and virtuosic playing hold up amazingly well–even if the rapping on tracks like [sic] "Under My Skin" binds 'L.D. 50′ more to nu-metal than to the math-metal tag". In 2020, it was named one of the 20 best metal albums of 2000 by Metal Hammer magazine.

== Track listing ==
All tracks are written by Chad Gray, Ryan Martinie, Greg Tribbett and Matthew McDonough. Interludes composed by Matthew McDonough.

No.	Title	Length
1.	"Monolith"	1:52
2.	"Dig"	2:43
3.	"Internal Primates Forever"	4:25
4.	"-1"	3:58
5.	"Death Blooms"	4:52
6.	"Golden Ratio"	0:54
7.	"Cradle"	5:14
8.	"Nothing to Gein"	5:29
9.	"Mutatis Mutandis"	1:43
10.	"Everything and Nothing"	3:14
11.	"Severed"	6:33
12.	"Recombinant Resurgence"	2:00
13.	"Prod"	6:03
14.	"Pharmaecopia"	5:34
15.	"Under My Skin"	3:47
16.	"(K)now F(orever)"	7:06
17.	"Lethal Dosage"	2:59
Total length:		68:32

Japanese edition bonus tracks
No.	Title	Length
18.	"Dig" (live)	2:43
19.	"Cradle" (live)	5:03

== Personnel ==
Mudvayne

- Chad Gray – lead vocals
- Greg Tribbett – guitars, backing vocals
- Ryan Martinie – bass
- Matthew McDonough – drums, keyboards

Additional personnel

- Garth Richardson – producer, audio production
- Dean Maher – engineer
- Steve Richards – executive producer
- M. Shawn Crahan – executive producer
- Steve Sisco – assistant engineer
- Scott Ternan – assistant engineer
- Andre Wahl – audio engineer
- Andy Wallace – mixing at Soundtrack Studios, New York City
- Howie Weinberg – mastering at Masterdisk, New York City

== Charts ==
=== Weekly charts ===
Chart (2000–01)	Peak position
Australian Albums (ARIA)	33
UK Rock & Metal Albums (OCC)	32
US Billboard 200	85
US Heatseekers Albums (Billboard)	1

=== Singles ===
Song	Chart (2001)	Position
"Dig"	Hot Mainstream Rock Tracks	33
"Death Blooms"	Hot Mainstream Rock Tracks	32

== Certifications ==
Region	Certification	Certified units/sales
United States (RIAA)	Platinum	1,000,000^{‡}
^{‡} Sales+streaming figures based on certification alone.
