= Mudvayne =

American metal band

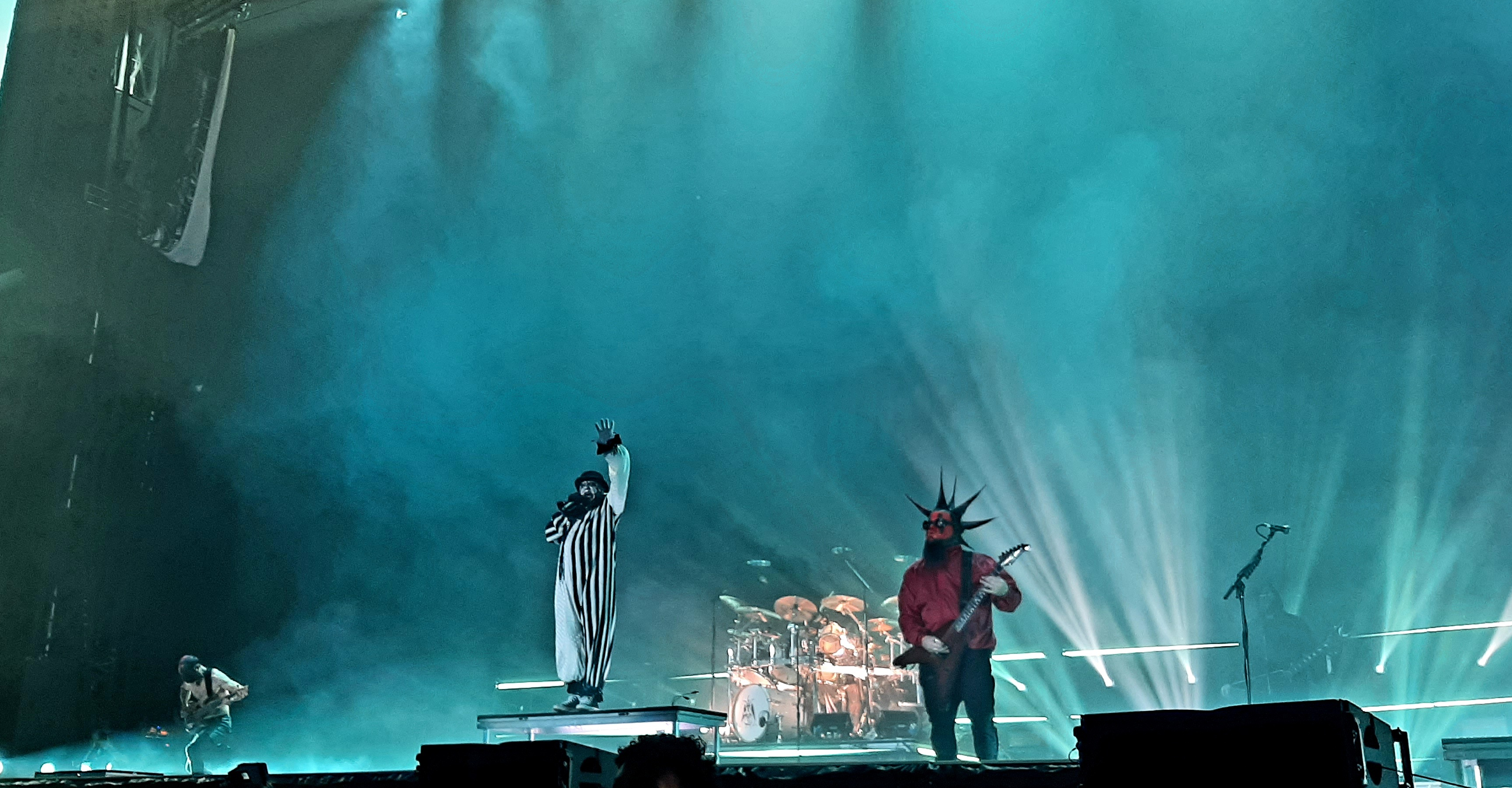
- Mudvayne performing at the Aftershock Festival in 2021. Left to right: Ryan Martinie, Chad Gray, Matthew McDonough, Greg Tribbett

Background information
- Origin: Peoria, Illinois, U.S.
- Genres: Alternative metal; nu metal; progressive metal; hard rock
- Works: Mudvayne discography
- Years active: 1996–2010; 2021–present
- Labels: Epic; Alchemy Recordings
- Spinoffs: Hellyeah; Audiotopsy
- Members: Greg Tribbett; Matthew McDonough; Chad Gray; Ryan Martinie
- Past members: Shawn Barclay
- Website: mudvayneofficial.com

Mudvayne is an American heavy metal band formed in Peoria, Illinois, in 1996. Known for their sonic experimentation and elaborate visual appearance, the band has sold over five million records worldwide. The group consists of Greg Tribbett (lead guitar); Matthew McDonough (drums); Chad Gray (lead vocals); Ryan Martinie (bass); and Marcus Rafferty (live rhythm guitar). The band became popular in the late-1990s Peoria underground music scene, and they found success with the single "Dig" from their debut album L.D. 50 (2000). After releasing four more albums and touring for nearly a decade, Mudvayne went on hiatus in 2010. They reunited in 2021, continuing to perform live, and on August 28, 2025, released their first new song in sixteen years, titled "Hurt People Hurt People".

== History ==
2005 logo

=== Early days, Kill, I Oughtta and L.D. 50 (1996–2001) ===
Mudvayne was formed in 1996 in Peoria, Illinois. The band originally consisted of guitarist Greg Tribbett, drummer Matthew McDonough and bassist Shawn Barclay. The band's lineup was finalized a matter of months later when Chad Gray, who was earning $40,000 a year in a factory, quit his day job to become its lead singer. In 1997, Mudvayne financed its debut EP, Kill, I Oughtta.

During the EP's recording, Barclay was replaced by Ryan Martinie, former bassist for the progressive rock band Broken Altar. After self-distributing Kill, I Oughtta, Mudvayne adopted stage names and face paint.

Chuck Toler managed the band as they recorded their 2000 debut album L.D. 50. For the album, Mudvayne experimented with a ragged, dissonant sound; a sound collage, prepared for the album, was used as a series of interludes. L.D. 50 was produced by the band and Garth Richardson, with executive production by Slipknot member Shawn Crahan and Slipknot manager Steve Richards.

L.D. 50 peaked at No. 1 on the Billboard Top Heatseekers chart and No. 85 on the Billboard 200. The singles "Dig" and "Death Blooms" peaked at No. 33 and No. 32 on the Mainstream Rock Tracks chart. Although the album was praised, some critics found the band hard to take seriously.

To promote L.D. 50, Mudvayne played on the Tattoo the Earth tour with Nothingface, Slayer, Slipknot and Sevendust. Nothingface guitarist Tom Maxwell became friends with Mudvayne vocalist Chad Gray, and they explored the possibility of a supergroup. The following year, Nothingface again toured with Mudvayne; although plans for a supergroup continued, they were put on hold due to scheduling conflicts. Gray and Maxwell had discussed five names for the group, and Mudvayne guitarist Greg Tribbett approached Maxwell "out of the blue" to join it. Although Nothingface drummer Tommy Sickles played on the group's demo, the search for another drummer began.

=== The End of All Things to Come and Lost and Found (2002–2005) ===
In 2002, Mudvayne released The End of All Things to Come, which the band considers its "black album" due to its largely-black artwork. Isolation inspired the album's songs. During its mixing, Gray and McDonough stopped at Bob's Big Boy and Gray remembered overhearing someone "say something like, ' ... and he's got to cut his own eye out'". When he asked McDonough if he heard the conversation McDonough said he hadn't, and Gray thought it was someone discussing a scene from a screenplay.

The album expanded on L.D. 50, with a wider range of riffs, tempos, moods and vocals. Because of this experimentation, Entertainment Weekly called this album more "user-friendly" than its predecessor and it was one of 2002's most acclaimed heavy-metal albums, it was eventually certified Gold by the RIAA in 2003. The music video for the single "Not Falling" demonstrated Mudvayne's change in appearance from L.D. 50, with the musicians transformed into veined creatures with white, egg-colored bug eyes. In 2003, Mudvayne participated in the Summer Sanitarium Tour, headlined by Metallica, and in September, Chad Gray appeared on V Shape Mind's debut studio album Cul-De-Sac.

In January 2004, the band began work on its third album, produced by Dave Fortman. As for the previous album, Mudvayne withdrew to write songs; they moved into a house, writing the album in four months before recording began after the Summer Sanitarium tour ended. In February, Gray and Martinie expressed an interest in appearing on Within The Mind – In Homage to the Musical Legacy of Chuck Schuldiner, a tribute to the founder of the metal band Death, but the album was never produced.

In 2005, Chad Gray established independent record label Bullygoat Records and Bloodsimple's debut album, A Cruel World (with a guest appearance by Gray), appeared in March. On April 12, Mudvayne released Lost and Found. The album's first single, "Happy?", featured complex guitar work and Gray described "Choices" as "the eight-minute opus".

In August, former Mudvayne bassist Shawn Barclay released his band Sprung's debut album, mastered by King's X guitarist Ty Tabor. That month, rumors spread that Bullygoat Records would release We Pay Our Debt Sometimes: A Tribute to Alice in Chains, with performances by Mudvayne, Cold, Audioslave, Breaking Benjamin, Static-X and the surviving members of Alice in Chains. A spokesperson for Alice in Chains told the press that the band was unaware of any tribute album, and Mudvayne's manager said that reports of the album were only rumors.

In September, the band met with director Darren Lynn Bousman, whose film Saw II was in production and would include "Forget to Remember" from Lost and Found. Bousman showed them a scene of a man cutting his eye out of his skull to retrieve a key. When Gray told Bousman about the conversation at Bob's Big Boy two years earlier, Bousman said he holds his production meetings at the restaurant and Saw II was based on a screenplay he wrote years earlier. Gray appeared briefly in the film, and the music video for "Forget to Remember" contained clips from Saw II.

=== The New Game and Mudvayne (2006–2009) ===
In 2006, Gray, Tribbett and Tom Maxwell were joined by former Pantera and Damageplan drummer Vinnie Paul for the supergroup Hellyeah. On March 8, when Mudvayne and Korn performed at the KBPI Birthday Bash in Denver, Thornton waitress Nicole LaScalia was injured during Mudvayne's set. Two years later, LaScalia filed a lawsuit against radio station owner Clear Channel Broadcasting, concert promoter Live Nation, the University of Denver and members of Mudvayne and Korn. During the summer, Gray, Tribbett, Maxwell and Paul recorded an album as Hellyeah. After a tour with Sevendust, Mudvayne released the 2007 retrospective By the People, for the People (compiled from selections chosen by fans on the band's website). The album debuted at number 51 on the U.S. Billboard 200 chart, selling about 22,000 copies in its first week.

After Gray and Tribbett returned from touring with Hellyeah, Mudvayne began recording The New Game with Dave Fortman. After the album's 2008 release, Fortman told MTV that it would be followed in six months by another full-length record.

For its self-titled fifth album, Mudvayne hoped to create a "white album", describing its cover art. The album, printed with blacklight paint, was only visible under a black light (a light whose wavelength is primarily ultraviolet). Mudvayne was recorded in the summer of 2008 and released in 2009.

=== Hiatus (2010–2021) ===
In 2010, Mudvayne again paused to allow Gray and Tribbett to tour with Hellyeah, and, because of the supergroup's album releases, the band would be on hiatus until at least 2014. With Hellyeah, Tribbett has recorded three albums: Hellyeah, Stampede and Band of Brothers. Gray has contributed to an additional fourth, fifth and sixth albums, Blood for Blood, Unden!able and Welcome Home. In 2012, Ryan Martinie toured with Korn as a temporary replacement for bassist Reginald Arvizu, who remained at home during his wife's pregnancy. The following year, Martinie played bass on Kurai's debut EP, Breaking the Broken, In 2014, Tribbett left Hellyeah.

=== Reunion (2021–present) ===
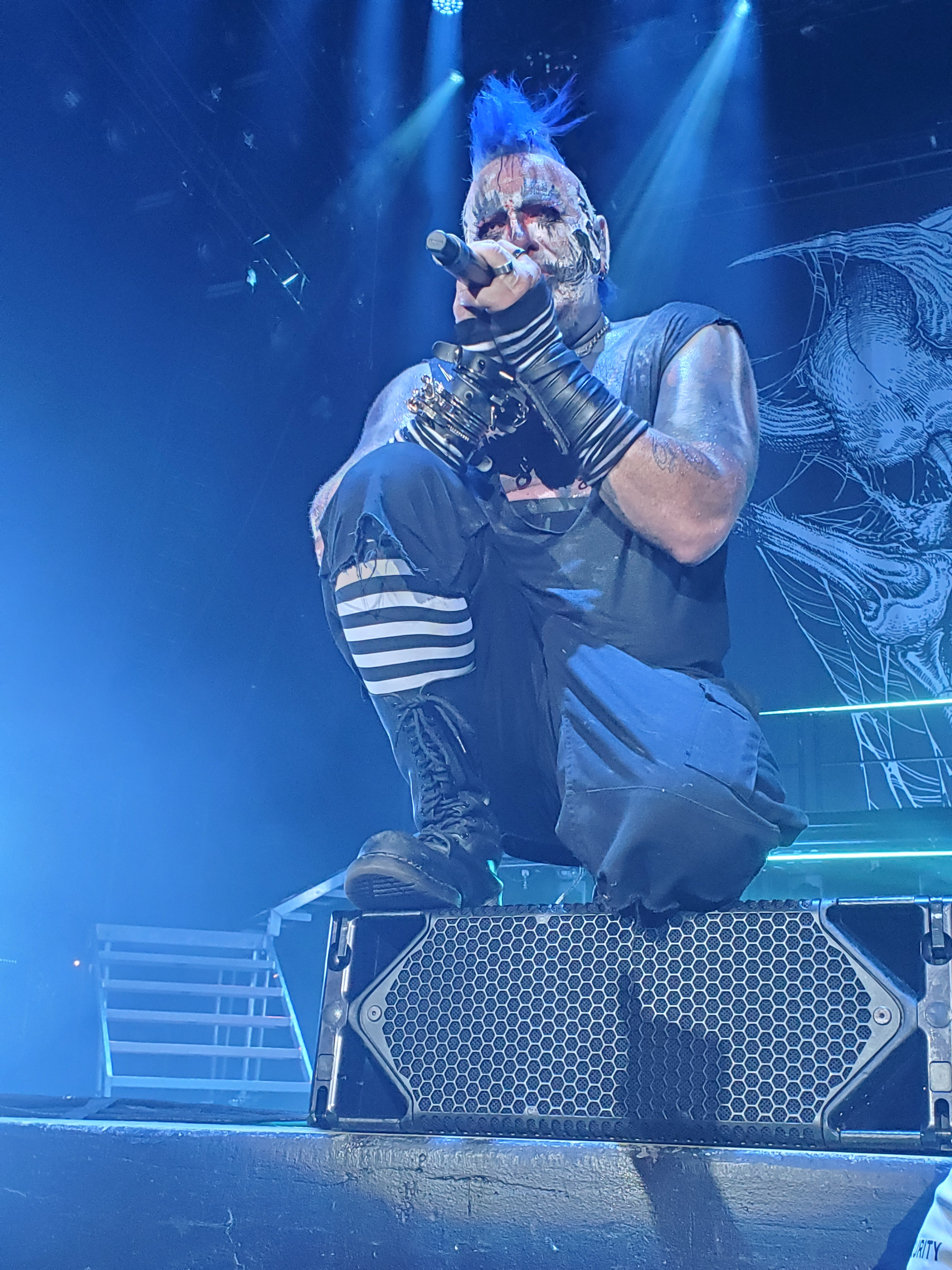
Vocalist Chad Gray in 2022

On April 19, 2021, Mudvayne announced that they had reunited and would play their first shows in 12 years in the fall, which included festival appearances at Inkcarceration Music & Tattoo in Mansfield, Aftershock in Sacramento and Welcome to Rockville in Florida; concert promoter and festival organizer Danny Wimmer stated that these would be the band's only live appearances for 2021. The band were previously scheduled to also appear at Louder Than Life in Louisville, before the performance was canceled on September 21 due to Gray and some staff members contracting COVID-19. The members of Mudvayne have reportedly discussed the possibility of new material. The band's reunion resumed in the summer of 2022 with appearances at Upheaval Festival in Grand Rapids and Rock Fest in Cadott, followed by their first US tour in 13 years, which saw Mudvayne co-headline the Freaks on Parade tour with Rob Zombie. The tour's stop in Tampa made headlines when during one show, Gray fell off the stage while performing the song "Not Falling". Gray himself noted the irony, and joked it was "amazing" and "unbelievable".

In May 2025, Mudvayne announced that they were signed to Alchemy Recordings for a sixth studio album. The band released "Hurt People Hurt People", their first song in 16 years, on August 27, 2025. A second song, "Sticks and Stones", was released two weeks later.

In January 2026, fans of the band expressed their distaste for the mixing on their two newest singles, "Hurt People Hurt People" and "Sticks and Stones". In response from the band, new versions of both singles were uploaded to streaming sites, with producer Dave Fortman adding: "...the band wasn’t happy with the results and the fans were unhappy as well... They called me to remix them so I took the same approach that I mixed Lost And Found with. Seems to have worked! Glad you guys are digging it."

The band took a hiatus in late January 2026, with multiple sources citing the band's heavy touring cycle in 2025 as their reason. Gray stated in an Instagram post, "Mudvayne is taking a break for 2026 but I just can’t do that. Music, creating, playing are the wells that I draw my happiness from so I need to keep going”, implying that other musical projects may occur during the hiatus.

== Artistry ==
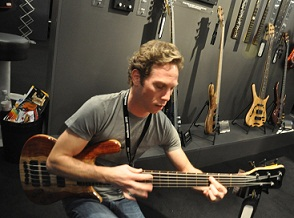
Mudvayne bassist Ryan Martinie is noted for his complex playing.

=== Musical style and influences ===
Mudvayne is noted for its musical complexity, complex meters and polyrhythms. The band's music contains what McDonough calls "number symbolism", where certain riffs correspond to lyrical themes. Metal Injection said the band combines its technical instrumentation with "theatrical flair". Mudvayne has incorporated elements of death metal, jazz, jazz fusion, progressive rock, speed metal, thrash metal and world music.

Mudvayne's influences include Tool, Pantera, King Crimson, Genesis, Emerson, Lake & Palmer, Carcass, Deicide, Emperor, Miles Davis, Black Sabbath, Rush, Obituary, Emperor, Mötley Crüe, Alice in Chains, Pearl Jam, Porcupine Tree, Metallica, Slayer, Korn, and Deftones. Mudvayne have repeatedly expressed admiration for Stanley Kubrick's 2001: A Space Odyssey, and were influenced by the film during the recording of L.D. 50.

Although Mudvayne has described its style as "math rock" and "math metal", drummer Matthew McDonough said in 2009: "I honestly don't know what 'math metal' is. I made a joke early on in Mudvayne's career that we used an abacus in writing. It seems I should be careful making jokes in interviews. I don't really see Mudvayne as an innovator in anything." Music critics and journalists have categorized the band as alternative metal, nu metal, experimental metal, extreme metal, hard rock, heavy metal, math metal, groove metal, neo-progressive metal, neo-progressive rock, progressive rock, and progressive metal. Eli Enis of Revolver magazine wrote that the band "wriggled between nu-metal, alt-metal, prog and hard rock in a way that remains completely unrivaled to this day. No one else has or ever will sound quite like them."

=== Image ===
Although Mudvayne was known for its appearance, Gray described its aesthetic as "music first, visuals second". When L.D. 50 was released, the band performed in horror film-style makeup. Epic Records initially promoted Mudvayne without focusing on its members; early promotional materials featured a logo instead of photos of the band, but its appearance and music videos publicized L.D. 50. The members of Mudvayne were originally known by the stage names Kud, sPaG, Ryknow and Gurrg. At the 2001 MTV Video Music Awards (where they won the MTV2 Award for "Dig"), the band appeared in white suits with bloody bullet-hole makeup on their foreheads. After 2002, Mudvayne changed makeup styles (from multicolored face paint to extraterrestrials) for promotional photos and changed their stage names to Chüd, Güüg, Rü-D, and Spüg, though they would continue to perform in the horror-style makeup live. According to the band, the extravagant makeup added a visual aspect to their music and set them apart from other metal bands. From 2003 up until their dissolution, Mudvayne largely abandoned the use of makeup to avoid image comparisons with the band Slipknot. With their 2021 reunion, they began wearing makeup again when performing live.

== Band members ==
Current members

- Greg Tribbett (a.k.a. Gurrg, Güüg) – lead guitar, backing vocals (1996–2010, 2021–present)
- Matthew McDonough (a.k.a. sPaG, Spüg) – drums, keyboards (1996–2010, 2021–present)
- Chad Gray (a.k.a. Kud, Chüd) – lead vocals (1996–2010, 2021–present)
- Ryan Martinie (a.k.a. Ryknow, Rü-D) – bass (1997–2010, 2021–present)

Touring musicians

- Marcus Rafferty – rhythm guitar, backing vocals (2021–present)

Former members

- Shawn Barclay – bass (1996–1997)

== Discography ==
Studio albums

- L.D. 50 (2000)
- The End of All Things to Come (2002)
- Lost and Found (2005)
- The New Game (2008)
- Mudvayne (2009)

== Awards and nominations ==
MTV Video Music Awards

Year	Nominee / work	Award	Result
2001	"Dig"	MTV2 Award	Won

Grammy Awards

Year	Nominee / work	Award	Result
2006	"Determined"	Best Metal Performance	Nominated

== Bibliography ==
- McIver, Joel (2006). Black Sabbath: Sabbath Bloody Sabbath. Music Sales Group. ISBN 0-85712-028-X.
