= Ryan Martinie =

American bassist

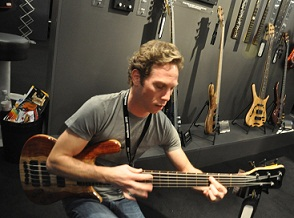
- Ryan Martinie on Frankfurt Musikmesse, 2010

Background information
- Also known as: RDM; Rü-d; Ry-Know; Br Br Deng
- Born: August 6, 1975 (age 50); Peoria, Illinois, U.S.
- Genres: Alternative metal; nu metal
- Occupation: Musician
- Instrument: Bass guitar
- Years active: 1998–present
- Member of: Mudvayne; Soften the Glare

Ryan Daniel Martinie (born August 6, 1975) is an American musician, best known as the bassist for heavy metal band Mudvayne.

== Career ==
=== Mudvayne ===
Martinie auditioned for Mudvayne two years after opening for them in 1995 with his previous band, Broken Altar. Martinie recalled the band initially being unnerved by his slapping and tapping, but accepting the change in sound. Martinie has remained with the band since, only pausing when the band went on hiatus in 2010 while Chad Gray focused on Hellyeah until 2021.

Martinie's bassline for "Dig" became an internet meme as the onomatopoeia "brbr-DENG", with Martinie being baffled but enthusiastic about it in 2019.

=== Other projects ===
Martinie was the guest bassist on Kurai, a project created by guitarist and vocalist Scott Von Heldt. The group released their debut EP, Breaking the Broken, on December 17, 2013.

In 2015, Martinie began playing with jazz fusion / progressive rock trio Soften the Glare. They recorded their first album, Making Faces, which was released on September 1, 2017. The second album, Glint, was released in 2020, and a number of EPs have also been released since then.

On August 2, 2012, Korn announced that Ryan Martinie was to join them on their European tour that began in Poland, as the band's bassist Fieldy and his wife were expecting a child.

== Musical style ==
Martinie is known for flicks and a flamenco style, notable on "Dull Boy" and the chorus of "Out To Pasture". He describes the chorus of "Out To Pasture" as a "fast flamenco guitar-picking pattern that's as fast as my hand can possibly play. It's just this [extremely] fast pattern, and it's a sleeper, because it sounds like I'm playing single-notes almost, or chords, like I'm strumming chords, but really what's going on there is something completely different." He has a unique heavy fingering technique from which he gets a percussive tone and a sharper, more extreme attack from his bass. He also uses slapping and popping techniques on most of the L.D. 50 album, most notably on the songs like "Dig". Martinie has developed his own tapping technique on the neck where he uses his index and middle fingers to tap an octave chord, usually high on the neck, while his left hand moves notes, doublestops or chords, similarly to the Who's John Entwistle. On the album Mudvayne, he also plays complex bass parts in the intros of "Beautiful And Strange" and "I Can't Wait".

== Personal life ==
Martinie often values a private lifestyle, sharing few details to the public. He resides in Danville, Virginia. Martinie is known as an avid reader. Some of his favorite musical artists include the Beatles, John Patitucci, Chick Corea, Genesis, King Crimson, Death, Meshuggah, and Mastodon.

== Equipment ==
=== Basses ===
- 1x Warwick Thumb NT Fretless Custom Shop Masterbuilt 5-string. He has used this bass with Soften the Glare, and it can be seen in their music video for "March of the Cephalopods".
- 1x Warwick Vampyre 4-string, which he was advertising back in 2003, but he always preferred his Thumb basses, so he was never actually seen with this bass.
- In 2021, Martinie teamed up with Fodera and released a signature model named "Blondie".

=== Amplification ===
Martinie primarily used Ampeg SVT Pro amplifiers until The New Game was released, at which time he switched to Warwick amplification. He currently uses the Warwick Xtreme 10.1 Amp Head and four Warwick WCA 411 Pro cabinets. He is also known for slaving Greg Tribbett's guitar cabinets during live shows.

== Discography ==
=== Mudvayne ===
Studio albums

- L.D. 50 (2000)
- The End of All Things to Come (2002)
- Lost and Found (2005)
- The New Game (2008)
- Mudvayne (2009)

=== Kurai ===
- Breaking the Broken (2013)

=== Soften the Glare ===
- Making Faces (2017)
- Glint (2020)
