= Greg Tribbett =

American guitarist (born 1968)

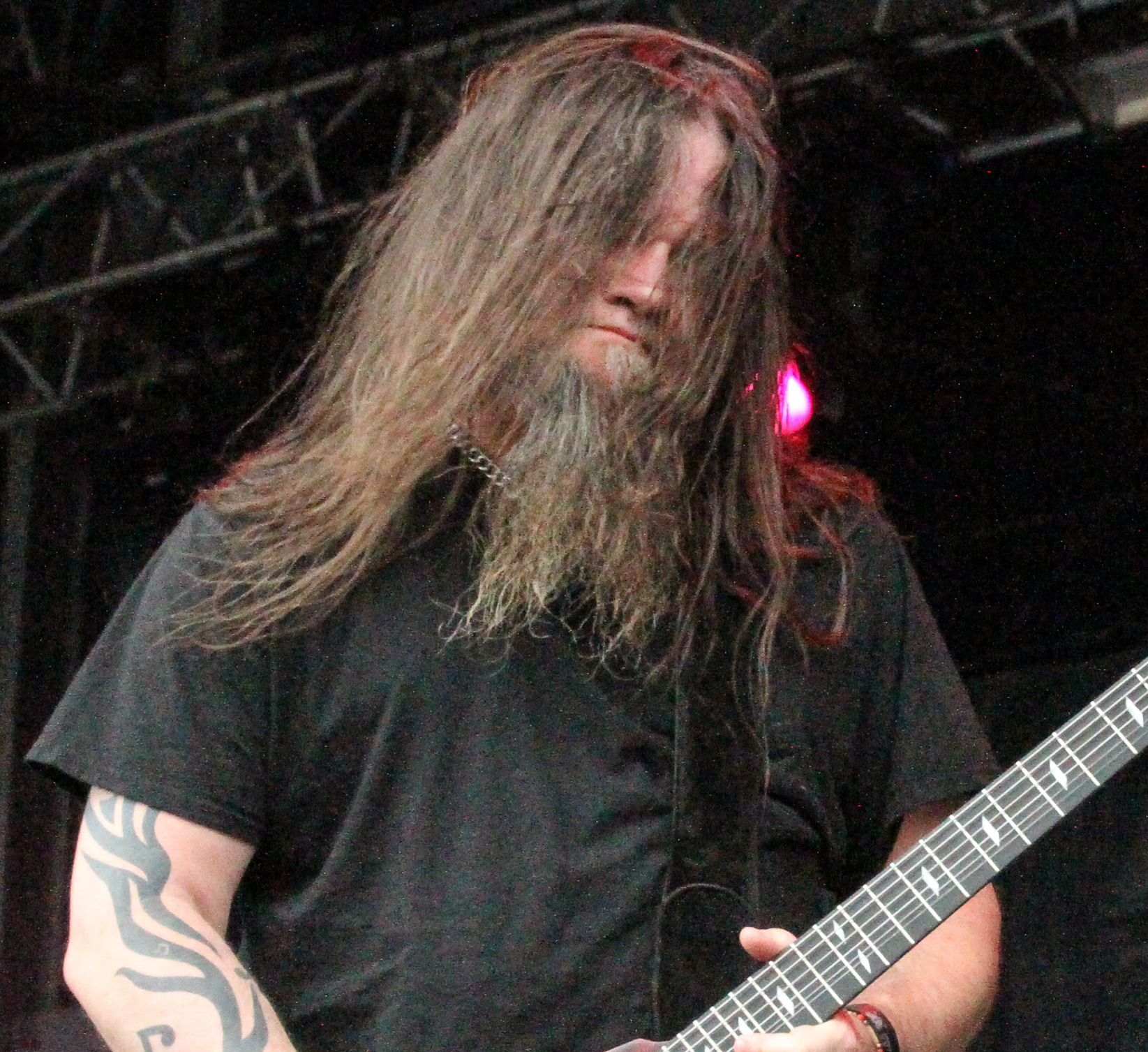
- Tribbett performing in 2013

Background information
- Also known as: Gurgg, Güüg
- Born: November 7, 1968 (age 58); Peoria, Illinois, U.S.
- Genres: Alternative metal; nu metal; groove metal
- Occupation: Musician
- Instrument: Guitar
- Years active: 1996–present
- Member of: Mudvayne; Dead Wyte
- Formerly of: Audiotopsy; Hellyeah

Gregory Arnold Tribbett Jr. (born November 7, 1968) is an American guitarist, backing vocalist, and one of the founding members of metal band Mudvayne. He is also the former lead guitarist and backing vocalist of metal bands Audiotopsy and Hellyeah. He has been with Mudvayne since their inception in 1996 until 2010, and again from 2021 to now. He has named Randy Rhoads as the guitarist who most influenced him. Greg has three brothers; Derrick "Tripp" Tribbett, who played bass for Dope and sang for Makeshift Romeo and Twisted Method, The Late Dustin "Diggz" Tribbett, once the bass player for Element and Dead End Asylum, now an independent musician and writer, and Matt Tribbett, who was a drum technician for American metal band Slipknot.

== Career ==
=== Mudvayne ===
Tribbett founded Mudvayne in 1996 in Peoria, Illinois. The lineup originally consisted of bassist Shawn Barclay, drummer Matthew McDonough, and Tribbett himself playing lead guitar. The band's original lineup finalized when Chad Gray, who was earning $40,000 a year in a factory, quit his day job to become its lead singer. Tribbett appeared on every one of the band's releases until they entered an indefinite hiatus in 2010, and he has been involved with Mudvayne's reunion since 2021.

In September 2025, Tribbett's wife died after a yearlong battle with cancer. This caused him to sit out the band's tour that fall, celebrating the 25th anniversary of L.D.50.

=== Hellyeah ===
In 2006, Tribbett joined Mudvayne's lead vocalist Chad Gray, rhythm guitarist Tom Maxwell and bassist Jerry Montano of Nothingface in forming the heavy metal/groove metal supergroup Hellyeah. He departed the band in 2014 to pursue other musical endeavors.

=== Audiotopsy ===
In 2015, Tribbett formed the band Audiotopsy with former Skrape lead vocalist Billy Keeton, bassist Perry Stern, and former Mudvayne drummer Matthew McDonough. They released their debut studio album Natural Causes on October 2, 2015. Their second album, The Real Now was released on November 2, 2018. In 2021, Greg and Matthew left Audiotopsy due to the reformation of Mudvayne.

Dead Wyte

On June 3rd 2026, Tribbett announced a new project called Dead Wyte, in which he performs guitar duties alongside brother and vocalist Derrick “Tripp” Tribbett. The band released their first song Mother Trucker on October 23rd.

== Equipment ==
Tribbett has been known to play a wide range of guitars, including a flying-V style by Legator. Legator produced a series of Tribbett signature models in that style.. In 2022, Tribbett endorsed Dean Guitars. In 2024, Dean produced a signature model, the Vengeance line, available in black or red satin finishes. Both feature the pentagram-inspired Mudvayne emblem on the lower horn and are equipped with EMG 81 and 85 pickups.

== Discography ==
=== Mudvayne ===
Studio albums

- L.D. 50 (2000)
- The End of All Things to Come (2002)
- Lost and Found (2005)
- The New Game (2008)
- Mudvayne (2009)

Compilation Albums

- By the People, for the People (2007)
- Playlist: The Very Best of Mudvayne (2011)

EPs

- Kill, I Oughtta (1997)
- The Beginning of All Things to End (2001)
- Live Bootleg (2003)

=== Hellyeah ===
Studio albums

- Hellyeah (2007)
- Stampede (2010)
- Band of Brothers (2012)

=== Audiotopsy ===
Studio albums

- Natural Causes (2015)
- The Real Now (2018)
