= Matthew McDonough =

American drummer (born 1969)

- Also known as: Spüg; sPaG; MjDawn
- Born: March 14, 1969 (age 57); Rockford, Illinois, U.S.
- Origin: Peoria, Illinois, U.S.
- Genres: Alternative metal; nu metal
- Occupation: Musician
- Instrument: Drums
- Years active: 1996–present
- Member of: Mudvayne; On the Shoulders of Giants
- Formerly of: Audiotopsy

Matthew McDonough (born March 14, 1969) is an American drummer best known as a member of the heavy metal band Mudvayne. He is the band's original drummer and has appeared and performed on every Mudvayne release to date. He was also the original drummer of Audiotopsy since 2015 until his departure in 2021. He holds a respected place in the world of drumming for his signature drumming style.

== Early life ==
McDonough was born in Rockford, Illinois, he attended Rockford East High School and was a member of the Phantom Regiment Drum and Bugle Corps. He was previously in a band called On the Shoulders of Giants; as well as a band called Daed Kcis.

He also lived in Washington, IL and went to Washington Community High School.

== Career ==
=== Mudvayne ===
Within Mudvayne, McDonough was said to be the most influential person in setting the direction for the concept themes on the band's first two albums. He is also known for composing, recording, mixing, and mastering the electronic interludes on both L.D. 50 (2000) and The End of All Things to Come (2002). Mudvayne, who were enjoying immense popularity, released three more albums—Lost and Found (2005), The New Game (2008) and Mudvayne (2009)—before going on an indefinite hiatus in 2010. They announced their reunion in April 2021.

=== Audiotopsy ===
In 2015, McDonough formed the band Audiotopsy with former Skrape lead vocalist Billy Keeton, former Mudvayne lead guitarist Greg Tribbett, and bassist Perry Stern. They released their debut studio album Natural Causes on October 2, 2015. In 2021, he and guitarist Greg Tribbett left Audiotopsy due to the reformation of Mudvayne.

=== Other projects ===
For his solo work, in 2008 McDonough released his first album under the alias "MjDawn" with his cousin David W. McDonough, called Frequency Response. On the album, he experiments with acoustic drumming and electronica. McDonough, as MjDawn, also has several side projects both with ambient/electronica artist Vir Unis under the band name MiKroNaught and with guitarist RFSans under the band name ultrAtheist.

On the production side of the music industry, he is co-owner of the label AtmoWorks together with Vir Unis.

== Equipment ==
McDonough uses Pearl drums, Alchemy cymbals, Easton Ahead Signature drum sticks, Easton Ahead drum gloves and Evans drum heads. His Pearl Masterworks kit with custom tobacco fade finish and custom satin chrome hardware includes:

- 20x16 bass drum
- 13x8 custom snare drum
- 8x7 tom (suspended directly on top of his 10x8 tom)
- 10x8 tom
- 12x9 tom
- 14x10 tom
- 16x16 suspended floor tom
- 18x16 suspended floor tom (to his left)

== Discography ==
=== Mudvayne ===
Studio albums

- L.D. 50 (2000)
- The End of All Things to Come (2002)
- Lost and Found (2005)
- The New Game (2008)
- Mudvayne (2009)

Compilation albums

- By the People, for the People (2007)
- Playlist: The Very Best of Mudvayne (2011)

EPs

- Kill, I Oughtta (1997)
- The Beginning of All Things to End (2001)
- Live Bootleg (2003)

=== Audiotopsy ===
Studio albums

- Natural Causes (2015)
- The Real Now (2018)
