= Chad Gray =

American singer (born 1971)

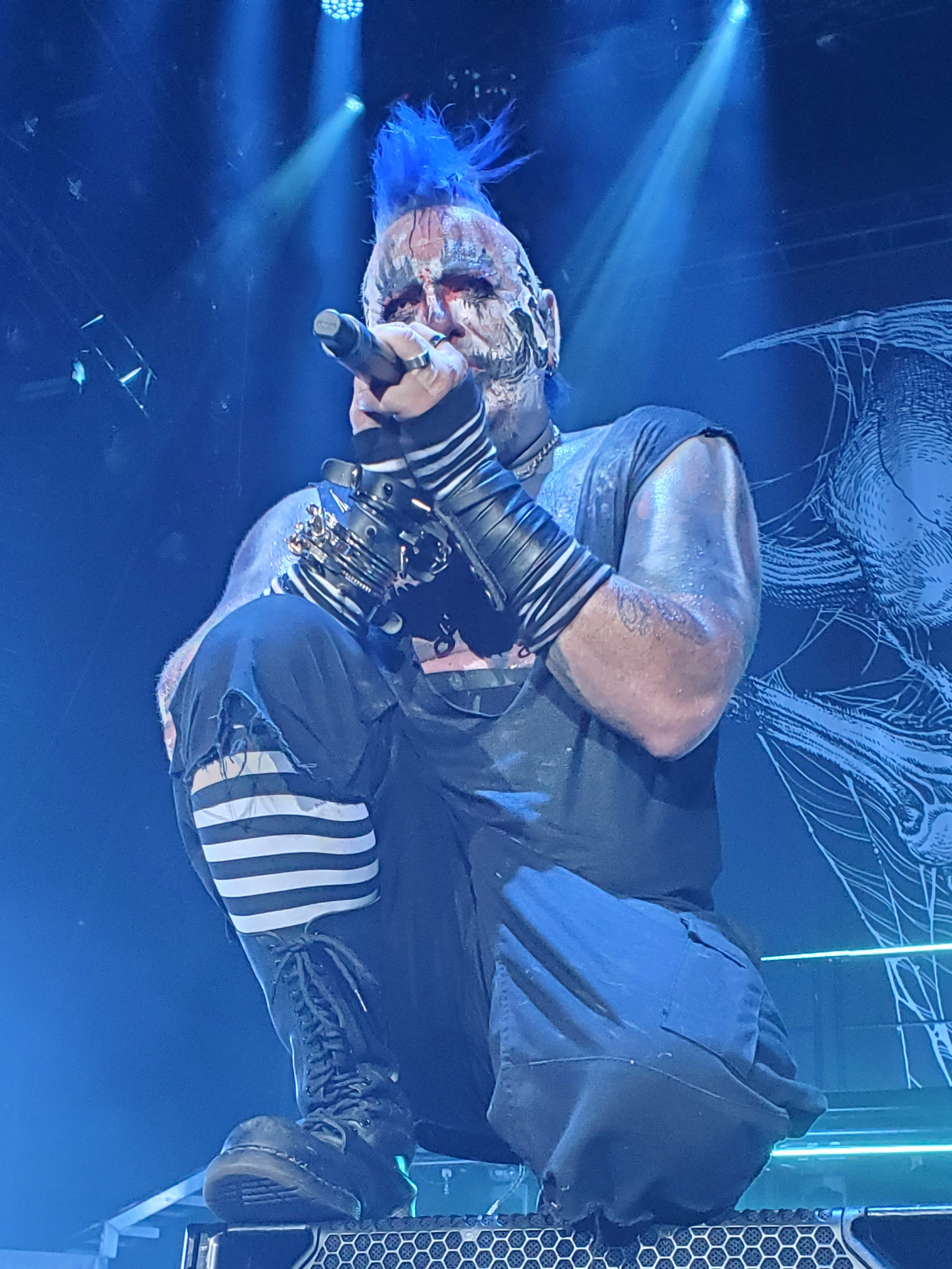
- Gray performing with Mudvayne in 2022

Background information
- Also known as: Kud; Chüd; Helvis
- Born: October 16, 1971 (age 55); Latham, Illinois, U.S.
- Genres: Alternative metal; nu metal; groove metal
- Occupations: Singer; songwriter
- Years active: 1996–present
- Member of: Mudvayne; Hellyeah

Chad Gray (born October 16, 1971) is an American singer, best known as the lead vocalist of heavy metal bands Mudvayne and Hellyeah.

== Career ==
=== Mudvayne ===
Gray quit his factory job that paid $40,000 a year to move to Peoria, Illinois and formed Mudvayne. The band's first album, L.D. 50, was released in 2000 to unexpected success, selling over half a million copies within a year of its release. Mudvayne went on to become one of the most successful heavy metal acts of the 2000s, and released four more studio albums—The End of All Things to Come (2002), Lost and Found (2005), The New Game (2008) and Mudvayne (2009)—before going on hiatus in 2010.

On April 19, 2021, it was announced that Mudvayne were reuniting for their first shows in over a decade, with the possibility of new material to follow.

He wrote Mudvayne's "Death Blooms" about his grandmother's disease.

=== Hellyeah ===
Gray became friends with Nothingface guitarist Tom Maxwell, and they talked about the possibility of forming a supergroup. The following year, Nothingface toured with Mudvayne and talks to form the supergroup continued, although they were constantly put on hold due to scheduling conflicts. At this time, Gray and Maxwell had brainstormed five band names.

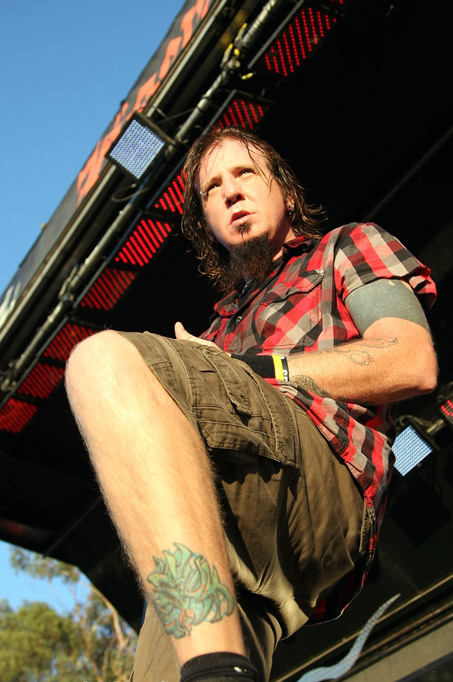
Gray performing with Hellyeah in 2010

Mudvayne guitarist Greg Tribbett approached Maxwell "out of the blue" and wanted to join the band. Nothingface drummer Tommy Sickles originally helmed the drum kit for the band's demo, however, things did not work out and the search for a new drummer began. The band knew former Pantera and Damageplan drummer Vinnie Paul, and tried to persuade him to join the band as their drummer. Originally, Paul was not sure if he would return to music after the death of his brother, Dimebag Darrell and an 18-month hiatus: "It was one of those things that I didn't think I'd be a part of this ever again without him, and after about a year and a half had gone by, these guys called me up, Chad [Gray] and Tom [Maxwell], they were like, 'We're thinking about putting this band together, would you be into it?' First couple of times, I told them, 'No, I don't think I'm ready to do this yet.' And they just were real persistent, they kept calling me. And one night, I had been drinking some red wine and listening to some KISS on 12" vinyl record and I said, 'You know what, lets take a shot at this, lets see what happens.'"

The band's persistence paid off and Paul joined the project. Paul commented about joining the project: "Everybody had their head in the right place and that let's-tear-the-world-a-new-ass attitude".

Hellyeah released six studio albums before the band went on hiatus in 2021.

=== Other works ===
Gray has made several guest appearances with other bands, including on the songs "Monsters" by V Shape Mind, "Falling Backwards" by Bloodsimple and "Miracle" by Nonpoint.

Gray made an appearance during Mitch Lucker's Memorial Show and sang "Fuck Everything" by Suicide Silence.

== Personal life ==
Gray was previously married to Kelli Olson in 2005. He later married Shannon Gunz, a radio host for several SiriusXM channels including Turbo, Octane and Ozzy's Boneyard.

== Discography ==
=== Mudvayne ===
- L.D. 50 (2000)
- The End of All Things to Come (2002)
- Lost and Found (2005)
- The New Game (2008)
- Mudvayne (2009)

=== Hellyeah ===
- Hellyeah (2007)
- Stampede (2010)
- Band of Brothers (2012)
- Blood for Blood (2014)
- Unden!able (2016)
- Welcome Home (2019)
