= Hellyeah discography =

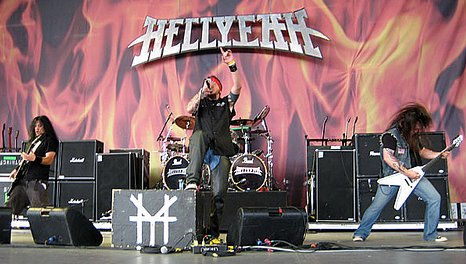
- Hellyeah performing in 2007
- Studio albums: 6
- Live albums: 2
- Compilation albums: 3
- Singles: 15
- Video albums: 1
- Music videos: 19
- Promotional singles: 8

The discography of American heavy metal supergroup Hellyeah consists of six studio albums, one video album, fifteen singles, eight promotional singles and nineteen music videos.

== Albums ==
=== Studio albums ===
List of studio albums, with selected chart positions
Title	Album details	Peak chart positions										Certifications
Title	Album details	US	US Hard Rock	US Rock	AUS	BEL (WA)	CAN	GRC	JPN	SWI	UK Rock	Certifications
Hellyeah	Released: April 10, 2007 (US); Label: Epic; Formats: CD, digital download	9	15	3	49	—	41	—	78	—	—	RIAA: Gold
Stampede	Released: July 13, 2010 (US); Label: Epic; Formats: CD, digital download	8	2	3	42	—	24	8	286	—	—	
Band of Brothers	Released: July 17, 2012 (US); Label: Eleven Seven; Formats: CD, digital download	20	3	3	32	135	—	—	215	86	17	
Blood for Blood	Released: June 10, 2014 (US); Label: Eleven Seven; Formats: CD, LP, digital download	18	1	7	41	—	—	—	—	—	33	
Unden!able	Released: June 3, 2016 (US); Label: Eleven Seven; Formats: CD, digital download	18	2	4	20	—	32	—	—	—	—	
Welcome Home	Released: September 27, 2019 (US); Label: Eleven Seven; Formats: CD, digital download	57	2	8	25	—	—	—	—	83	—	
"—" denotes a recording that did not chart or was not released in that territory.

=== Live albums ===
List of live albums
Title	Album details
Below the Belt (Audio)	Released: November 15, 2007 (US); Label: Epic; Formats: CD
The Singles Live	Released: June 16, 2017; Label: Epik; Formats: Unknown

=== Compilation albums ===
List of compilation albums
Title	Album detailsa
Blood for Brothers	Released: June 7, 2016; Label: Eleven Seven Music; Formats: 2CD
Metal Hammer	Released: September 30, 2016; Label: Epic; Format: CD
Hell's Golden Songs	Released: July 4, 2021; Label: The Hellyeah Studios; Formats: CD, 2LP, Cassette

=== Video albums ===
List of video albums
Title	Album details
Below the Belt	Released: November 13, 2007 (US); Label: Epic; Formats: DVD

== Singles ==
List of singles, with selected chart positions, showing year released and album name
Title	Year	Peak chart positions					Album
Title	Year	US Sales	US Air.	US Alt.	US Main. Rock	US Rock	Album
"You Wouldn't Know"	2007	—	—	35	5	—	Hellyeah
"Alcohaulin' Ass"	2007	—	—	—	7	—	Hellyeah
"Thank You"	2008	—	—	—	37	—	Hellyeah
"Hell of a Time"	2010	—	20	37	5	20	Stampede
"Better Man"	2010	—	—	—	26	—	Stampede
"Band of Brothers"	2012	—	—	—	22	—	Band of Brothers
"Drink Drank Drunk"	2012	—	—	—	26	—	Band of Brothers
"Sangre por Sangre (Blood for Blood)"	2014	5 (Note: "Sangre por Sangre (Blood for Blood)" and "Cross to Bier (Cradle of Bones)" charted as a double A-side single on the Hot Singles Sales chart in the United States.)	—	—	17	—	Blood for Blood
"Cross to Bier (Cradle of Bones)"	2014	5	—	—	—	—	Blood for Blood
"Moth"	2014	—	31	—	8	—	Blood for Blood
"Hush"	2015	—	40	—	10	—	Blood for Blood
"Human"	2016	—	33	—	11	—	Unden!able
"I Don't Care Anymore"	2016	—	32	—	10	—	Unden!able
"Love Falls"	2017	—	22	—	5	43	Unden!able
"Welcome Home"	2019	—	25	—	4	43	Welcome Home
"—" denotes a recording that did not chart or was not released in that territory.

=== Promotional singles ===
List of promotional singles, showing year released and album name
Title	Year	Album
"Hellyeah"	2007	Hellyeah
"Cowboy Way"	2010	Stampede
"Pole Rider"	2011	Stampede
"War in Me"	2012	Band of Brothers
"333"	2019	Welcome Home
"Oh My God"	2019	Welcome Home
"Black Flag Army"	2019	Welcome Home
"Skyy and Water"	2019	Welcome Home

== Music videos ==
List of music videos, showing year released and directors
Title	Year	Director(s)
"You Wouldn't Know"	2007	Nathan Cox
"Alcohaulin' Ass"	2007	Videobob Moseley
"Thank You"	2008	—N/a
"Cowboy Way"	2010	Frankie Nasso
"Hell of a Time"	2010	Frankie Nasso
"Better Man"	2010	Frankie Nasso
"Band of Brothers"	2012	David Brodsky
"Drink Drank Drunk"	2012	—N/a
"Sangre por Sangre (Blood for Blood)"	2014	Robert Sexton
"Moth"	2014	Robert Sexton
"Hush"	2015	Robert Sexton
"Human"	2016	Robert Sexton
"I Don't Care Anymore"	2016	William "Wombat" Felch
"Love Falls"	2017	William "Wombat" Felch
"333"	2019	William "Wombat" Felch
"Welcome Home"	2019	William "Wombat" Felch
"Oh My God"	2019	William "Wombat" Felch & Sebastien Paquet
"Black Flag Army"	2019	William "Wombat" Felch & Megan Felch
"Skyy and Water"	2019	Wombat Fire
