= Medication (band) =

American rock band

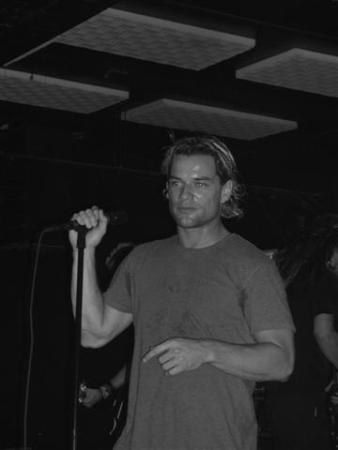
- Whitfield Crane performing in 2002

Background information
- Origin: Los Angeles, California, U.S.
- Genres: Alternative metal, alternative rock, post-grunge, nu metal
- Years active: 1999–2003
- Label: Locomotive
- Past members: Whitfield Crane; Logan Mader; B. Blunt; Kyle Sanders; Chris Hamilton; Roy Mayorga

Medication was an American rock band that included Logan Mader, Whitfield Crane, B. Blunt, Kyle Sanders and Roy Mayorga. They released a self-titled EP and an album titled Prince Valium through Locomotive Music, and filmed a video for the song "Inside". Before the recording of Prince Valium, Mayorga parted ways from the group to rejoin Soulfly for the recording of 3. He was replaced by Josh Freese during the recording of Prince Valium, before being replaced by Chris Hamilton for the ensuing live shows. They played one show in Los Angeles with nu metal band Strain 999 at The Whisky on Sunset with Robert Trujillo, now of Metallica, on bass. They disbanded in 2003 due to the cancelation of their European tour and the US branch of their record label closing.

== Members ==
- Whitfield Crane (Ugly Kid Joe, Another Animal) – vocals (1999–2003)
- Logan Mader (Machine Head, Soulfly) – guitar, vocals, producer (1999–2003)
- B. Blunt – guitar (A Day in the Life) (1999–2003)
- Kyle Sanders (Piece Dogs, MonstrO, Hellyeah) – bass (1999–2003)
- Roy Mayorga (Stone Sour, Soulfly, Hellyeah) – drums (1999–2002)
- Josh Freese (The Vandals, Devo, A Perfect Circle) – drums (2002)
- Chris Hamilton (Bloodsimple, Downset.) – drums (2002–2003)

== Discography ==
=== EPs ===
- Medication (2002)

=== Studio albums ===
- Prince Valium (2002)
