= Nothingface =

Nothingface can refer to:

- Nothingface (Voivod album), from 1989
- Nothingface (band), a nu metal band
  - Nothingface (Nothingface album), from 1995
