= Stampede (Hellyeah album) =

Studio album by Hellyeah
- Released: July 13, 2010
- Recorded: 2009
- Genre: Groove metal alternative metal
- Length: 41:14
- Label: Epic
- Producer: Chad Gray; Sterling Winfield; Vinnie Paul

Hellyeah chronology
Hellyeah (2007)	Stampede (2010)	Band of Brothers (2012)

Singles from Stampede
- 1. "Hell of a Time" Released: June 1, 2010; 2. "Better Man" Released: November 9, 2010

Stampede is the second studio album by American heavy metal supergroup Hellyeah, released on July 13, 2010. It debuted at No. 8 on the Billboard 200, making it the band's highest-charted album to date. Stampede is the first Hellyeah album to feature bassist Bob Zilla.

The music video for "Cowboy Way" premiered on May 20, 2010. The first single, "Hell of a Time", was released on June 1, 2010. The music video for "Hell of a Time" premiered on June 16, 2010. The song "The Debt That All Men Pay" premiered on ultimate-guitar.com on June 22, 2010.

Professional ratings
Review scores
Source	Rating
AllMusic	3.5/5 stars

== Track listing ==
All tracks are written by Hellyeah.

No.	Title	Length
1.	"Cowboy Way"	3:44
2.	"Debt That All Men Pay"	3:10
3.	"Hell of a Time"	3:39
4.	"Stampede"	3:07
5.	"Better Man"	4:31
6.	"It's On!"	3:44
7.	"Pole Rider"	3:21
8.	"Cold as a Stone"	3:28
9.	"Stand or Walk Away"	4:49
10.	"Alive and Well"	3:17
11.	"Order the Sun"	4:23
Total length:		41:14

Deluxe edition Live in Dallas bonus DVD
No.	Title	Length
1.	"Matter of Time"
2.	"Goddamn"
3.	"Nausea"
4.	"Rotten to the Core"
5.	"Stone Cold Wasted" (Queen's "Stone Cold Crazy" cover)
6.	"Introductions" (spoken word)
7.	"Alcohaulin' Ass"
8.	"You Wouldn't Know"
9.	"Hellyeah"

== Charts ==
Chart (2010)	Peak position
U.S. Billboard 200	8
Australian ARIA Albums Chart	42

== Personnel ==
- Chad Gray – vocals
- Greg Tribbett – lead guitar
- Tom Maxwell – rhythm guitar
- Bob Zilla – bass
- Vinnie Paul – drums
