= Nothingface (Nothingface album) =

Studio album by Nothingface
- Released: December 31, 1995
- Genre: Nu metal, alternative metal
- Length: 44:05 (original); 42:36 (remaster)
- Label: Emporium (1995); Sick6/Play the Assassin (2009)
- Producer: Nothingface

Nothingface chronology
| Thicker (1994) | Nothingface (1995) | Pacifier (1997) |

Digital reissue cover

Professional ratings
Review scores
| Source | Rating |
|---|---|
| AllMusic | 2.5/5 stars |

Nothingface is a self-titled demo album by American metal band Nothingface. It is the first album with lead singer Matt Holt.

The album was initially released in 1995 but was reissued as a download on April 30, 2009, with remastering done by Drew Mazurek (producer for Hellyeah, Linkin Park, Gwar and others)

== Track listing ==
1995 original

1. "Defaced" – 3:15
2. "Perfect Person" – 4:23
3. "Severed" – 4:56
4. "Useless" – 3:51
5. "Self Punishment" – 4:54
6. "Hitch" – 5:50
7. "Carousel" – 4:05
8. "Deprive" – 3:12
9. "Godkill" – 4:06
10. "Communion" – 5:37

== Personnel ==
- Matt Holt – vocals
- Tom Maxwell – guitar
- Bill Gaal – bass
- Chris Houck – drums
