= An Audio Guide to Everyday Atrocity =

Studio album by Nothingface
- Released: September 22, 1998
- Recorded: 1998
- Studios: Private Playboy Club (Baltimore, Maryland, U.S.)
- Genres: Nu metal; alternative metal
- Length: 37:56
- Label: DCide/Mayhem
- Producers: Nothingface and Drew Mazurek

Nothingface chronology
| Pacifier (1997) | An Audio Guide to Everyday Atrocity (1998) | Violence (2000) |

Professional ratings
Review scores
| Source | Rating |
|---|---|
| AllMusic | 4.5/5 stars |
| Chronicles of Chaos | 9/10 |
| Collector's Guide to Heavy Metal | 8/10 |
| The Daily Vault | B |

An Audio Guide to Everyday Atrocity is the second album by the Washington, D.C.–based alternative metal band Nothingface. The album was released on September 22, 1998, via DCide/Mayhem Records.

== Musical style ==
The main guitar riff from "I, Diablo" originally appeared in "Prayer", an early Nothingface song from their 1994 demo Braid. The song "Breathe Out" had also been performed earlier in 1997, while the band were touring in support of their debut Pacifier. The album's sound has been compared in the media to bands such as Clutch, Helmet and Pantera, unlike their debut Pacifier, which mainly drew comparisons to the band Korn.

== Track listing ==
All lyrics are written by Matt Holt; all music is composed by Nothingface.

| No. | Title | Length |
|---|---|---|
| 1. | "Goldtooth" | 4:21 |
| 2. | "Grinning" | 3:20 |
| 3. | "So Few" | 4:11 |
| 4. | "Villains" | 3:28 |
| 5. | "Sleeper" | 4:44 |
| 6. | "Breathe Out" | 3:39 |
| 7. | "Error in Excellence" | 4:19 |
| 8. | "I, Diablo" | 4:09 |
| 9. | "The Sick" | 5:45 |

== Personnel ==
- Matt Holt – vocals
- Tom Maxwell – guitar
- Bill Gaal – bass, programming
- Chris Houck – drums

== Singles ==
| Year | Song |
|---|---|
| 1998 | "Breathe Out" |
| 1998 | "The Sick" |
