= Idle hands =

Idle hands may refer to:

- Idle Hands, a 1999 American teen horror comedy film
- "Idle Hands", a song from the Kerry King album From Hell I Rise
- Unto Others (band), a band originally formed as Idle Hands
- "The devil finds work for idle hands", an exhortation by Isaac Watts
- The Devil's Hands Are Idle Playthings, a Futurama episode

== See also ==
- Sloth (sin)
