= Pacifier (Nothingface album) =

Studio album by Nothingface
- Released: October 10, 1996
- Recorded: 1996
- Studio: OZ Recording Studio/Emporium Recording Studio; Mixed July 9–17, 1996
- Genre: Nu metal, alternative metal
- Length: 42:21
- Label: DCide
- Producer: Nothingface & Frank Marchand

Nothingface chronology
Nothingface (1995)	Pacifier (1996)	An Audio Guide to Everyday Atrocity (1998)

Singles from Pacifier
- 1. "Pacifier" Released: 1997; 2. "One Thing" Released: 1997; 3. "Defaced" Released: 1997

Pacifier is the debut album by American alternative metal band Nothingface. It was originally released by DCide in October 1996 and then re-released on February 6, 1997, and was reissued on August 11, 1998 on Mayhem Records.

== Background ==
Many of the tracks on Pacifier were re-recorded from the band's 1995 independent release Nothingface. The tracks "Defaced", "Self Punishment", "Hitch", "Useless", "Perfect Person", and "Communion" were all re-recorded from Nothingface with slight lyrical changes.

To help promote the album, music videos were made for the tracks "Pacifier" and "Defaced". In "Pacifier", singer Matt Holt is seen wearing a bright golden jacket, which he claimed the videographers forced him to wear, in order to give the video a "happier" feel.

== Critical reception ==
Professional ratings
Review scores
Source	Rating
AllMusic	3/5 stars
Collector's Guide to Heavy Metal	7/10

AllMusic gave the album three stars out of five and said that although "Pacifier has garnered unfair comparisons to Korn", the band shows "a bright flair that could very well lead them to stardom." Mark Jenkins from The Washington Post criticized Holt's harsh vocals and a lack of variety on the album, although he acknowledged the technical skill and musicianship of the band.

== Musical style and lyrics ==
Elements of alternative metal, post-punk, and death metal are incorporated throughout the album. Matt Holt's harsh and growling vocals are different from Nothingface releases that come after Pacifier. The album's songs feature a musical formula that has been described as being similar to the band Korn.

Lyrical themes explored include self-loathing, inner turmoil, self-esteem issues, animosity, and feeling suicidal. The track "Defaced" is about child molestation and abuse.

== Track listing ==
All lyrics are written by Matt Holt; all music is composed by Nothingface.

No.	Title	Length
1.	"One Thing"	4:29
2.	"Pacifier"	3:59
3.	"Lipsdick"	3:18
4.	"Undercut"	4:17
5.	"Defaced"	2:50
6.	"Self Punishment"	4:12
7.	"Hitch"	5:38
8.	"Useless"	3:47
9.	"Perfect Person"	4:29
10.	"Communion"	5:22

== Personnel ==
- Matt Holt – vocals
- Tom Maxwell – guitar
- Bill Gaal – bass, keyboards, programming
- Chris Houck – drums

== Singles ==
Year	Song
1997	"Pacifier"
1997	"One Thing"
1997	"Defaced"
