= 2027 in rock music =

This article summarizes the events related to rock music for the year 2027.

== Future releases ==
- January 29
  - The Offspring will release their first live album, Just the Punk Stuff – Live at The Stone Pony.
- February 12
  - Slayer guitarist Kerry King will release his second solo album, The End of All Gods.
- February 26
  - Blondie will release their first studio album in ten years, High Noon. It will be their first since the 2025 death of longtime drummer Clem Burke, who contributed to the album prior to his death.
  - Slash featuring Myles Kennedy & the Conspirators will release their first studio album in five years, Flying Blind.
- March 5
  - Staind will release their first studio album in four years, The Space Between the Darkness and the Light.
- April 9
  - Fear Factory will release their first studio album in six years, Roboticist. It will be the band's first album to feature vocalist Milo Silvestro and drummer Pete Webber (replacing Burton C. Bell and Mike Heller respectively), in addition to bassist Tony Campos, who had joined in 2015 but appears on a Fear Factory album for the first time.

=== Unknown dates ===
- The Ataris are scheduled to release their sixth studio album, Revolution Summer, this year; it will be their first full-length album since Welcome the Night (2007). It was intended for release in March or April 2026, but was delayed due to manufacturing issues.
- The Cult are expected to release new music this year. It will be their first since the departure of drummer John Tempesta in November 2026.
- Living Colour is expected to release their first studio album in ten years.
- Primus is expected to release their first studio album in ten years. It will be their first to feature new drummer John Hoffman, who replaced Tim "Herb" Alexander in 2025.
- Queensrÿche is expected to release their first studio album in five years.
