= Thank You (Hellyeah song) =

Single by Hellyeah

from the album Hellyeah
- Released: 2008
- Recorded: 2007
- Genre: Alternative metal
- Length: 4:31
- Label: Epic
- Songwriter(s): Vincent Abbott; Chad Gray; Tom Maxwell; Jerry Montano; Greg Tribbett
- Producer(s): Vinnie Paul; Sterling Winfield

Hellyeah singles chronology
"Alcohaulin' Ass" (2007)	"Thank You" (2008)	"I Don't Care Anymore" (2016)

"Thank You" is the third single by heavy metal band Hellyeah from their debut album Hellyeah. The song is a tribute to all of the band's then-recently departed family members: Vinnie Paul's brother Dimebag Darrell, Tom Maxwell's mother, and Chad Gray's grandmother. The song reached number 37 on the Billboard Hot Mainstream Rock Tracks chart.

== Personnel ==
Hellyeah

- Chad Gray – vocals
- Greg Tribbett – guitar
- Tom Maxwell – guitar
- Jerry Montano – bass
- Vinnie Paul – drums

Production

- Produced, engineered, mixed, and mastered by Vinnie Paul and Sterling Winfield
- Co-produced by Hellyeah
- Additional guitar tracks recorded by Drew Mazurek
