= Violence (Nothingface album) =

Studio album by Nothingface
- Released: June 5, 2000
- Recorded: September 1999, March–April 2000
- Studio: Armoury Studios (Vancouver, BC)
- Genre: Nu metal; alternative metal
- Length: 49:28
- Label: TVT Records
- Producer: Drew Mazurek

Nothingface chronology
| An Audio Guide to Everyday Atrocity (1998) | Violence (2000) | Skeletons (2003) |

Violence is the third album by the Washington, D.C.-based alternative metal band Nothingface. The album was released on June 5, 2000, via TVT Records. The album received positive reviews, but didn't experience mainstream popularity, selling only 87,000 copies in the United States.

== Production ==
Early demos for the album were recorded in September 1999, including several songs which would end up being cut from the final track list. On March 10, 2000, the band flew to Canada, arriving at a studio located in Vancouver, British Columbia to begin recording Violence, spending six weeks in the city.

The track "For All the Sin" features an audio clip from the 1963 thriller film The Birds by Alfred Hitchcock.

In a 2017 interview, drummer Chris Houck stated he learned that he had dangerously high blood pressure levels prior to recording the album, which would eventually lead to him leaving the band.

The timing was so terrible. We were about a week or less from going into the studio at this point I think. Stuff was booked and paid for to record Violence and we had tours starting to line up for after the studio as well. I really had to do some soul searching. What I ended up doing is taking a couple of different meds with me up to Vancouver when we recorded the record and trying different ones to see if any of them worked. Of course, none of them really did unfortunately. I remember recording drums during the day and then checking my blood pressure when I could at the studio and at the apartments where we were staying and being like what the hell. So nothing was really changing and at that point I didn’t want it to hold the band back so I talked to the guys about different options. There just weren’t a whole lot of good options for a band about to go out on a big tour and me dealing with all of the stuff I was at the same time. So at that point I felt like I didn’t have a lot of choices but to stop and handle my health issues or it could be really bad. So what we decided to do was as I was recording Violence, we got Tommy (Sickles) to start learning the songs so that any shows after the record he could play in my place for the time being.

— Chris Houck

At the time, the members of Nothingface referred to Violence as "the soundtrack for the end of the world."

== Critical reception ==
Professional ratings
Review scores
| Source | Rating |
|---|---|
| AllMusic | 4/5 stars |
| Blabbermouth.net | 7/10 |
| Collector's Guide to Heavy Metal | 7/10 |
| Kerrang! | 4/5 stars |
| Metal Hammer | 7/10 |
| ThePRP | 4.5/5 stars |

Violence received positive reviews. CMJ included it in their "Best Loud Rock Albums" of 2000 and called it, "A complex collection of stellar songs... with a flesh-slicing, hate-infused edge... the year's finest heavy-with-melody album." AllMusic gave the album 4 stars out of 5 and said, "The combo strives for freshness and originality, providing a compelling blend of melody and brute force." The band described the album as "the soundtrack for the end of the world." The Morning Call described the album as "whatever metal". In 2015, VH1 ranked the album fourth on their list of "The 12 Most Underrated Nu Metal Albums".

== Track listing ==
All lyrics are written by Matt Holt; all music is composed by Nothingface.

| No. | Title | Length |
|---|---|---|
| 1. | "Make Your Own Bones" | 3:29 |
| 2. | "Bleeder" | 3:29 |
| 3. | "Same Solution" | 4:22 |
| 4. | "For All the Sin" | 4:23 |
| 5. | "Can't Wait for Violence" | 4:29 |
| 6. | "Dead Like Me" | 4:12 |
| 7. | "Blue Skin" | 4:18 |
| 8. | "Filthy" | 4:49 |
| 9. | "Hidden Hands" | 4:08 |
| 10. | "American Love" | 3:17 |
| 11. | "Everlasting Godstopper" | 5:04 |
| 12. | "Piss & Vinegar" | 3:27 |

1999 demo B-sides
| No. | Title | Length |
|---|---|---|
| 1. | "How Long" |
| 2. | "Chris Houck Acoustic" |
| 3. | "Tom Maxwell Acoustic" |
| 4. | "Untitled" |

== Personnel ==
Nothingface

- Matt Holt – vocals
- Tom Maxwell – guitar
- Bill Gaal – bass, keyboards, samples
- Chris Houck – drums

Additional personnel

- Drew Mazurek – producer, engineering
- Paul Silveira – assistant engineering, Pro Tools digital editing
- Davor Vulama – assistant engineering
- David Bottrill – mixing, digital editing
- Josh Wilbur – assistant mixing engineer, digital editing
- Ted Jensen – mastering
- Benjamin Wheelock – art design

== Chart positions ==
| Chart (2000) | Peak position |
|---|---|
| US Top Independent Albums (Billboard) | 27 |
| US Heatseekers Albums (Billboard) | 24 |
