= Hellyeah (album) =

Studio album by Hellyeah
- Released: April 10, 2007
- Recorded: 2006 – January 2007
- Studio: Chasin Jason Studios (Dalworthington Gardens, Texas)
- Genre: Groove metal
- Length: 43:47
- Label: Epic
- Producers: Vinnie Paul; Sterling Winfield; Hellyeah

Hellyeah chronology
Hellyeah (2007)	Stampede (2010)

Singles from Hellyeah
- 1. "You Wouldn't Know" Released: February 27, 2007; 2. "Alcohaulin' Ass" Released: October 2, 2007; 3. "Thank You" Released: 2008

Hellyeah is the debut album by American heavy metal band Hellyeah, featuring various members of Pantera, Mudvayne, Damageplan, and Nothingface. It was released on April 10, 2007. According to MusicMight, the band finished album recordings in January 2007, and the single "You Wouldn't Know" went to U.S. radio in late February. This is the only album to feature original bassist Jerry Montano.

"You Wouldn't Know" is about the difficulty of maintaining one's integrity in the profit-obsessed music industry. "Thank You" is a tribute to all of the band's recently departed family members: Vinnie Paul's brother Dimebag Darrell, Tom Maxwell's mother, and Chad Gray's grandmother.

Professional ratings
Review scores
Source	Rating
About.com	2.5/5 stars
AllMusic	3.5/5 stars
Blabbermouth.net	3.5/5 stars
Metal Hammer	7/10 stars
Terrorizer Magazine	5/10 stars

The album debuted at number 9 on the Billboard 200, selling 45,000 copies in its first week. As of September 26, 2007, it has sold 188,670 copies in the U.S. The album has been certified gold in the United States.

== Track listing ==
All tracks are written by Hellyeah.

No.	Title	Length
1.	"HELLYEAH"	3:30
2.	"You Wouldn't Know"	4:18
3.	"Matter of Time"	3:46
4.	"Waging War"	3:05
5.	"Alcohaulin' Ass"	3:54
6.	"GodDamn"	3:20
7.	"In the Mood"	0:58
8.	"Star"	3:42
9.	"Rotten to the Core"	3:52
10.	"Thank You"	4:31
11.	"Nausea"	4:59
12.	"One Thing"	3:50
Total length:		43:47

Best Buy bonus track
No.	Title	Length
13.	"Alcohaulin' Ass" (acoustic version)	3:27

== Certifications ==
Region	Certification	Certified units/sales
United States (RIAA)	Gold	500,000^{‡}
^{‡} Sales+streaming figures based on certification alone.

== Personnel ==
Hellyeah

- Chad Gray – vocals
- Greg Tribbett – guitar
- Tom Maxwell – guitar
- Jerry Montano – bass
- Vinnie Paul – drums

Production

- Produced, engineered, mixed, and mastered by Vinnie Paul and Sterling Winfield
- Co-produced by Hellyeah
- Additional guitar tracks recorded by Drew Mazurek
