= You Wouldn't Know (Hellyeah song) =

Single by Hellyeah

from the album Hellyeah
- Released: February 27, 2007
- Recorded: 2006
- Genre: Alternative metal; heavy metal
- Length: 4:18
- Label: Epic
- Songwriter(s): Vincent Abbott; Chad Gray; Tom Maxwell; Jerry Montano; Greg Tribbett
- Producer(s): Vinnie Paul; Sterling Winfield

Hellyeah singles chronology
"You Wouldn't Know" (2007)	"Alcohaulin' Ass" (2007)

"You Wouldn't Know" is the first single from heavy metal supergroup Hellyeah from their debut album Hellyeah. This song is featured in the video games Madden NFL 08 and WWE SmackDown vs. Raw 2008.

Lyrically, the song is about the struggles that Vinnie Paul dealt with after the murder of his brother Dimebag Darrell. It can be interpreted as a narrative, where Vinnie Paul is the elder, telling a younger person that "You couldn't be me even if you wanted to" because of the heartbreak that he had to overcome.

== Chart performance ==
The song reached number 5 on the Billboard Hot Mainstream Rock Tracks chart and reached number 35 on the Modern Rock Tracks chart.

== Music video ==
The video for the song was released in March 2007. It features the musical group performing live in front of a large crowd observing them.

== Personnel ==
Hellyeah

- Chad Gray – vocals
- Greg Tribbett – lead guitar
- Tom Maxwell – rhythm guitar
- Jerry Montano – bass
- Vinnie Paul – drums

Production

- Produced, engineered, mixed, and mastered by Vinnie Paul and Sterling Winfield
- Co-produced by Hellyeah
- Additional guitar tracks recorded by Drew Mazurek
