= From Hell I Rise =

Studio album by Kerry King
- Released: May 17, 2024
- Recorded: 2023
- Studio: Henson (Los Angeles)
- Genre: Thrash metal
- Length: 46:37
- Label: Reigning Phoenix
- Producer: Josh Wilbur

Kerry King chronology
From Hell I Rise (2024)	The End of All Gods (2027)

Singles from From Hell I Rise
- 1. "Idle Hands" Released: February 5, 2024; 2. "Residue" Released: April 12, 2024; 3. "Trophies Of The Tyrant" Released: April 28, 2026

Professional ratings
Review scores
Source	Rating
Blabbermouth.net	7/10
Classic Rock	3.5/5 stars
Kerrang!	4/5
Metal.de	8/10
Metal Forces	7/10
Metal Hammer	4/5 stars
MetalSucks	3/5 stars
Rock Hard	8.5/10
Rolling Stone	4/5 stars

From Hell I Rise is the debut solo studio album by Slayer guitarist Kerry King, released on May 17, 2024, through Reigning Phoenix Music. It is King's first album since disbanding Slayer in 2019, and its contributors include Mark Osegueda of Death Angel on vocals, former Vio-lence and Machine Head guitarist Phil Demmel, Hellyeah bassist Kyle Sanders, and Slayer and former Testament, Forbidden and Exodus drummer Paul Bostaph. The album's sound has been described as similar to Slayer.

The album topped Rolling Stone's ranking of the best metal albums of 2024.

On April 28th 2026, a third single, Trophies Of The Tyrant, was released to promote the Deluxe edition for the album, which was released on June 19th. The Deluxe edition features five tracks on which King takes the role of lead vocals, before Osegueda was brought in for the vocals on the base edition.

== Background and recording ==
Work on From Hell I Rise began as early as 2020, with King saying in an interview on the Dean Guitars YouTube channel that August that he had "more than two records' worth of music". King's Slayer bandmate and drummer Paul Bostaph stated that same month he and King were working on a new project that would "sound like Slayer without it being Slayer — but not intentionally so."

Progress on the album remained slow within the next three years. King said in a January 2024 interview with Metal Hammer magazine that it had been "done since June" 2023, with production handled by Josh Wilbur. About five months after its completion, King hinted that he was going to release the debut album by his new project in 2024; this project was later revealed to be his solo debut album. Details of the album, including its title, release date and lineup, were announced on February 5, 2024, and its first single "Idle Hands" was premiered on the same day.

== Track listing ==
All tracks are written by Kerry King.

No.	Title	Length
1.	"Diablo"	1:54
2.	"Where I Reign"	3:51
3.	"Residue"	4:40
4.	"Idle Hands"	3:45
5.	"Trophies of the Tyrant"	3:33
6.	"Crucifixation"	5:15
7.	"Tension"	2:48
8.	"Everything I Hate About You"	1:21
9.	"Toxic"	3:54
10.	"Two Fists"	3:37
11.	"Rage"	3:25
12.	"Shrapnel"	5:01
13.	"From Hell I Rise"	3:33
Total length:		46:37

Extended Deluxe Edition
No.	Title	Length
14.	"Crucifixation (Demo: Kerry King Vocals)"	5:16
15.	"From Hell I Rise (Demo: Kerry King Vocals)"	3:35
16.	"Two Fists (Demo: Kerry King Vocals)"	3:38
17.	"Rage (Demo: Kerry King Vocals)"	3:25
18.	"Trophies Of The Tyrant (Demo: Kerry King Vocals)"	3:36

== Personnel ==
Personnel taken from From Hell I Rise liner notes.

Musicians

- Kerry King – lead and rhythm guitar
- Paul Bostaph – drums
- Kyle Sanders – bass
- Phil Demmel – rhythm & lead guitar (2–6, 9, 13)
- Mark Osegueda – vocals

Lead Guitar credits

- Diablo – all: King
- Where I Reign – first: King, second: Demmel, third: King
- Residue – first: Demmel, second: King
- Idle Hands – first: Demmel, second: King
- Trophies of the Tyrant – first: Demmel, second: King, third: Demmel, fourth: King
- Crucifixation – first: King, second: Demmel, third: King
- Tension – King
- Toxic – first: Demmel, second: King, third: King
- Rage – both: King
- Shrapnel – King
- From Hell I Rise – first: Demmel, second: King, third: Demmel/King & Demmel

Technical

- Kerry King – executive production
- Josh Wilbur – production, mixing, mastering, engineering
- Kyle McAulay – engineering
- Mark Aguilar – engineering assistance
- Warren Lee – studio technician
- Ron Sandoval – pre-production recording

Visuals

- Marcelo Vasco – art, logo
- James Bousema – gatefold artwork
- Miloš Spasojević – layout

== Charts ==
Chart performance for From Hell I Rise
Chart (2024)	Peak position
Australian Digital Albums (ARIA)	8
Australian Physical Albums (ARIA)	25
Austrian Albums (Ö3 Austria)	4
Belgian Albums (Ultratop Flanders)	56
Belgian Albums (Ultratop Wallonia)	45
Dutch Albums (Album Top 100)	73
Finnish Albums (Suomen virallinen lista)	16
French Albums (SNEP)	62
German Albums (Offizielle Top 100)	3
Japanese Albums (Oricon)	24
Japanese Digital Albums (Oricon)	27
Japanese Hot Albums (Billboard Japan)	26
Polish Albums (ZPAV)	5
Scottish Albums (Official Charts)	7
Swedish Hard Rock Albums (Sverigetopplistan)	7
Swedish Physical Albums (Sverigetopplistan)	9
Swiss Albums (Schweizer Hitparade)	5
UK Albums (Official Charts)	75
UK Independent Albums (Official Charts)	5
UK Rock & Metal Albums (Official Charts)	1
US Top Album Sales (Billboard)	9
US Top Current Album Sales (Billboard)	9
US Heatseekers Albums (Billboard)	2
US Indie Store Album Sales (Billboard)	7
US Top Hard Rock Albums (Billboard)	11
