= Skeletons (Nothingface album) =

Studio album by Nothingface
- Released: April 22, 2003
- Recorded: October 2002 — Early 2003
- Studios: Armoury Studios (Vancouver, Canada)
- Genres: Nu metal; alternative metal
- Length: 47:58
- Label: TVT
- Producer: Bill Kennedy

Nothingface chronology
Violence (2000)	Skeletons (2003)

Skeletons is the fourth and final studio album by the American alternative metal band Nothingface. It is their only album featuring Tommy Sickles on drums. The album was released on April 22, 2003, via TVT Records, their second as well as last album released on the label. The album is considered Nothingface's most diverse release, featuring elements of genres such as thrash metal and hardcore.

== Background, music and lyrical themes ==
Nothingface began writing material for Skeletons in January 2002. The album's writing process lasted nine-and-a-half months, compared to three months for their previous album Violence (2000). During the 2001–2002 interval between their previous album Violence and Skeletons, Nothingface experienced significant turmoil with lead singer Matt Holt (who was going through substance abuse issues) seeing his house burn down, Tom Maxwell's mother dying and bassist Bill Gaal divorcing his wife, leading to the band nearly breaking up. The band began recording Skeletons in October 2002, and spent a month and a half recording the album at Armoury Studios in Vancouver, Canada. It was completed by early 2003.

In an interview with Tom Maxwell, he said "I don't think Skeletons has a musical direction. I've said it before but it sounds to me like a band imploding and losing focus. The next record will redeem the sound I believe was lost during the Violence/Skeletons cycle. Too many cooks in the kitchen can sometimes create a mediocre meal. Especially when the cooks come from different schools." The album is considered the band's most diverse release to date, with its music drawing elements from genres such as hardcore and thrash metal. The album's lyrics are also more political than previous Nothingface releases. Lyrical themes on the album include the invasion of Afghanistan, organized religion, murder and the American government. The song "Ether" is about George W. Bush and his Middle East policies. The song "Here Comes the Butchers" is about Catholicism and Catholic Church sexual abuse cases.

== Critical reception ==
Professional ratings
Review scores
Source	Rating
AllMusic	4/5 stars
Collector's Guide to Heavy Metal	6/10
laut.de	3/5 stars
Metal Hammer	5/10
Rock Hard	8.5/10

The album received positive reviews. Justin Donnelly of Blistering gave the album a positive review and wrote "Skeletons may be both more and extreme in either directions, but with Holt's upfront lyrical stance, Bill Kennedy's (Monster Magnet, Nine Inch Nails, Filter) amazing production and a growth in mature evident within the songs, Nothingface will surely mark their mark from year onwards." Ambier Authier of Exclaim.ca gave the album a positive review writing

"Highly underrated as a group, Nothingface seems to use Skeletons to take a stab at organised religion and its well-publicised problems, the American government and their actions in the Middle East, and more. Produced by Bill Kennedy (Monster Magnet and Nine Inch Nails), Skeletons will take Nothingface on a long tour schedule including their current run with Ministry and the entire summer on the Ozzfest line-up. The band continues to evolve sonically on their recordings and Skeletons is the current transformation. A good pick."

Alex Henderson of AllMusic gave the album a positive review and a 4 out of 5 stars rating, writing "Those who admired Violence can take comfort in knowing that despite the challenges Nothingface's members faced in 2001 and 2002, they have no problem excelling on the equally impressive Skeletons."

Alternative Press compared its heavy yet melodic sound to Alice in Chains.

== Track listing ==
All lyrics are written by Matt Holt.

No.	Title	Music	Length
1.	"Machination"	Bill Gaal, Tom Maxwell	4:00
2.	"Beneath"	Tommy Sickles, Maxwell	3:33
3.	"Murder Is Masturbation"	Maxwell	3:55
4.	"Ether"	Gaal	3:43
5.	"I Wish I Was a Communist"	Gaal, Maxwell	4:03
6.	"In Avernus"	Maxwell	3:28
7.	"Patricide"	Gaal	3:56
8.	"Here Come the Butchers"	Gaal, Maxwell	2:59
9.	"I Am Him"	Maxwell	4:05
10.	"Scission"	Gaal, Maxwell	3:06
11.	"Big Fun at the Gallows"	Gaal	3:56
12.	"Incarnadine"	Maxwell	3:45
13.	"All Cut Up"	Maxwell, Sickles	3:38

Bonus tracks (Japan and UK special edition)
No.	Title	Length
14.	"Down in Flames"	2:27
15.	"Bleeder"	3:39

Sampler
No.	Title	Length
1.	"Ether"	3:42
2.	"Beneath"	3:32
3.	"Here Come the Butchers"	2:58

2002 demos
No.	Title	Length
1.	"Down in Flames (demo)"	2:28
2.	"Ether (demo)"	3:44
3.	"Patricide (demo)"	4:17
4.	"Beneath (demo)"	3:46
5.	"In the Wake Of"	4:18
6.	"Here Come the Butchers (demo)"	3:04
7.	"Principals of Gangsterism"	3:14
8.	"I Wish I Was a Communist (demo)"	4:03
9.	"All Cut Up (demo)"	3:36
10.	"Machination (demo)"	3:58

== Credits ==
- Matt Holt – vocals
- Tom Maxwell – guitar
- Bill Gaal – bass, keyboards, programming
- Tommy Sickles – drums

== Charts ==
Chart (2003)	Peak position
US Billboard 200	125
US Heatseekers Albums (Billboard)	3
US Top Independent Albums (Billboard)	7
