= The End of All Gods =

Studio album by Kerry King
- Released: February 12, 2027
- Studios: NRG Studios (North Hollywood); Total Access (Redondo Beach)
- Genre: Thrash metal
- Label: Reigning Phoenix
- Producer: Josh Wilbur

Kerry King chronology
From Hell I Rise (2024)	The End of All Gods (2027)

Singles from The End of All Gods
- 1. "My War" Released: November 17, 2026

The End of All Gods is the upcoming second solo studio album by Slayer guitarist Kerry King. The album will be released on February 12, 2027, through Reigning Phoenix Music.

== Background and recording ==
As early as February 2025, King revealed his intention to work on a second solo album, confirming that he and Paul Bostaph "have got 10, 12 songs demoed already" and that the "realistic goal" is to release it in early 2026. In an April 2025 interview with Rolling Stone Brasil, Kerry said, "What the plan is, is whenever [the] cycle [for From Hell I Rise] is done, and right now that looks to me like October, Paul and I have always talked about going straight from playing live, taking maybe a week off and go right in the studio to keep your tour chops, so you're firing on all cylinders — you don't gotta practice to get good; you're already good — and get in there and record it.

Produced by Josh Wilbur, The End of All Gods was recorded at NRG Studios and Total Access in North Hollywood and Redondo beach respectively.

== Release and promotion ==
On November 9, 2026, King announced his second solo studio album, The End of All Gods, set for release on February, 12, 2027. Concurrently, he announced its lead single "My War", which was released on November 17, 2026.

== Track listing ==
All tracks are written by Kerry King.

No.	Title	Length
1.	"Gospel"
2.	"Flatline"
3.	"Executioners"
4.	"Diversions"
5.	"My War"	3:09
6.	"Adversary/No Tolerance"
7.	"Insurgent"
8.	"Retaliate"
9.	"Retribution"
10.	"Driving the Nails"
11.	"The End of All Gods"

== Personnel ==
Musicians

- Kerry King – lead and rhythm guitar
- Paul Bostaph – drums
- Kyle Sanders – bass
- Phil Demmel – rhythm & lead guitar
- Mark Osegueda – vocals
