= Alcohaulin' Ass =

Single by Hellyeah

from the album Hellyeah
- Released: October 2, 2007
- Recorded: 2006
- Genre: Southern rock; hard rock
- Length: 3:54
- Label: Epic
- Songwriter(s): Vinnie Paul; Chad Gray; Tom Maxwell; Jerry Montano; Greg Tribbett
- Producer(s): Vinnie Paul; Sterling Winfield

Hellyeah singles chronology
"You Wouldn't Know" (2007)	"Alcohaulin' Ass" (2007)	"Thank You" (2008)

"Alcohaulin' Ass" is a song by American heavy metal band Hellyeah and the second single from their album of the same name. The name is a combination of the word alcohol and the phrase "haulin' ass". As the song opens, Chad Gray sings in a country-type croon, and acoustic guitars are heard in the background with typical Western-sounding effects. The song picks up into a grooving hard rock format, where it continues for the rest of the track. The bonus edition of the album Hellyeah includes a solely acoustic version of "Alcohaulin' Ass".

== Chart performance ==
The song reached number 7 on the Mainstream Rock Tracks chart.
