= Kyle Sanders =

American bassist

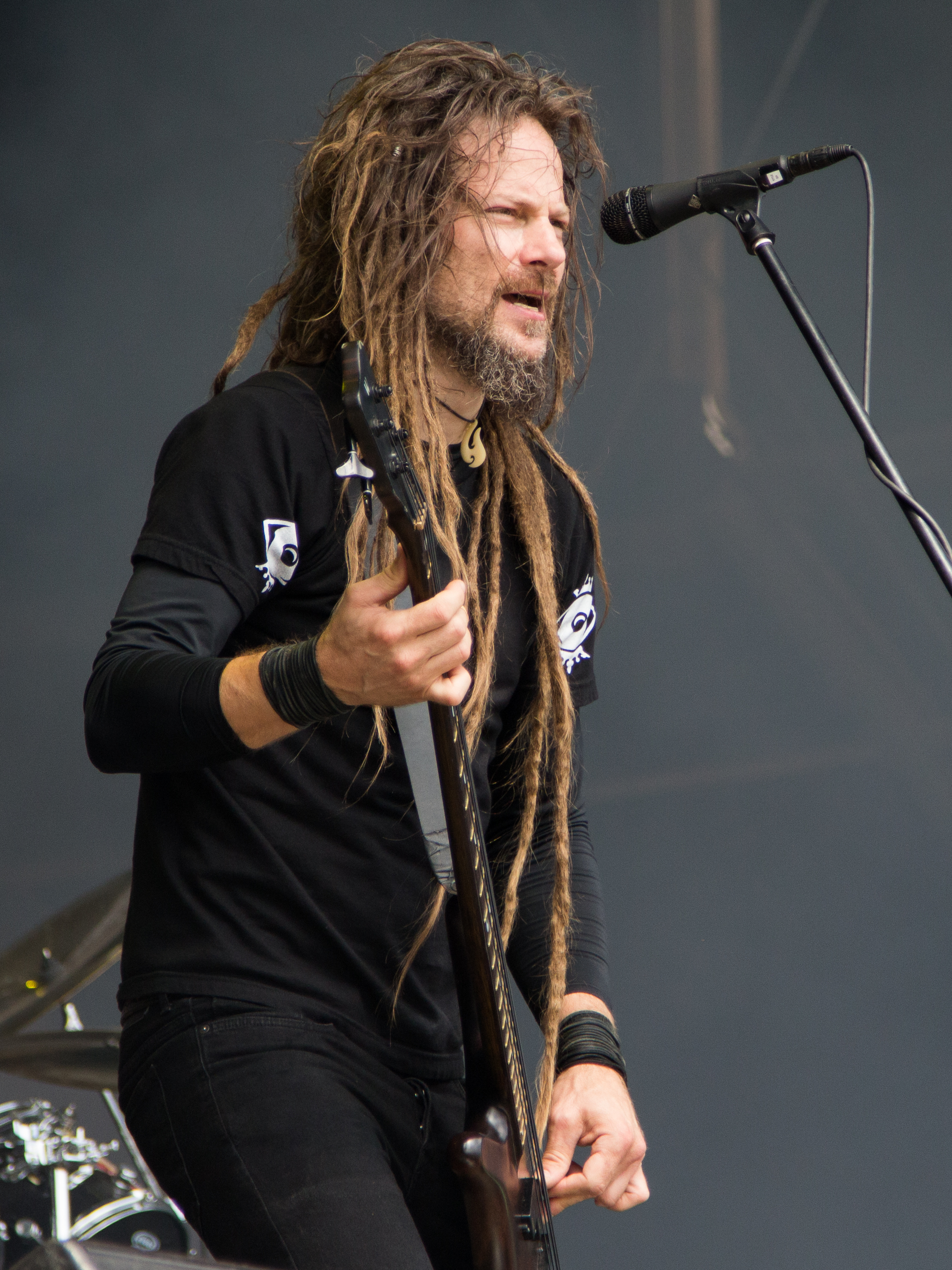
- Sanders in 2014

Background information
- Origin: Atlanta, Georgia
- Genres: Heavy metal; thrash metal; groove metal; metalcore; alternative metal; hard rock
- Occupation: Bassist
- Years active: 1996–present
- Member of: Kerry King
- Formerly of: Hellyeah; Skrew; Medication; Bloodsimple; MonstrO

Kyle Sanders is an American bass guitarist who was a member of heavy metal supergroup Hellyeah and is currently a member of Kerry King's solo band. He previously played for Skrew, Medication, Bloodsimple, and MonstrO. He is the brother of Mastodon bassist Troy Sanders, who he has occasionally collaborated with.

== Biography ==
Sanders started playing bass in middle school, he taught himself by playing along to his favorite metal bands. His younger brother, Troy, also plays bass because of Kyle. His first notable band was the industrial metal band Skrew.

He was an original member of Medication, alongside Logan Mader (guitar, vocals), Whitfield Crane (vocals), B. Blunt (guitar), and Roy Mayorga (drums). The band recorded one album, Prince Valium (2002), and one self-titled EP.

Sanders was a founding member of Bloodsimple, originally founded under the name Fix 8, alongside members of Vision of Disorder. With the band, he toured alongside Superjoint Ritual, Static-X, Soulfly, and Avenged Sevenfold. Bloodsimple dispanded in 2008 after Vision of Disorder reunited.

After Bloodsimple broke up, Sanders co-founded MonstrO along ex-Bloodsimple drummer Bevan Davies and ex-Torche guitarist Juan Montoya. This band went on hiatus in 2014 after Sanders joined Hellyeah.

Sanders joined Hellyeah in 2014 as a replacement for Bob Zilla. He joined alongside Christian Brady, who replaced founding member Greg Tribbett. Sanders was also joined in Hellyeah by Roy Mayorga, who he had played with in Medication, following the death of founding drummer Vinnie Paul. The band went on hiatus in 2021.

In February 2024, Sanders was announced as bassist for Slayer guitarist Kerry King's solo band, playing on his debut album From Hell I Rise and the single "Idle Hands".

== Personal life ==
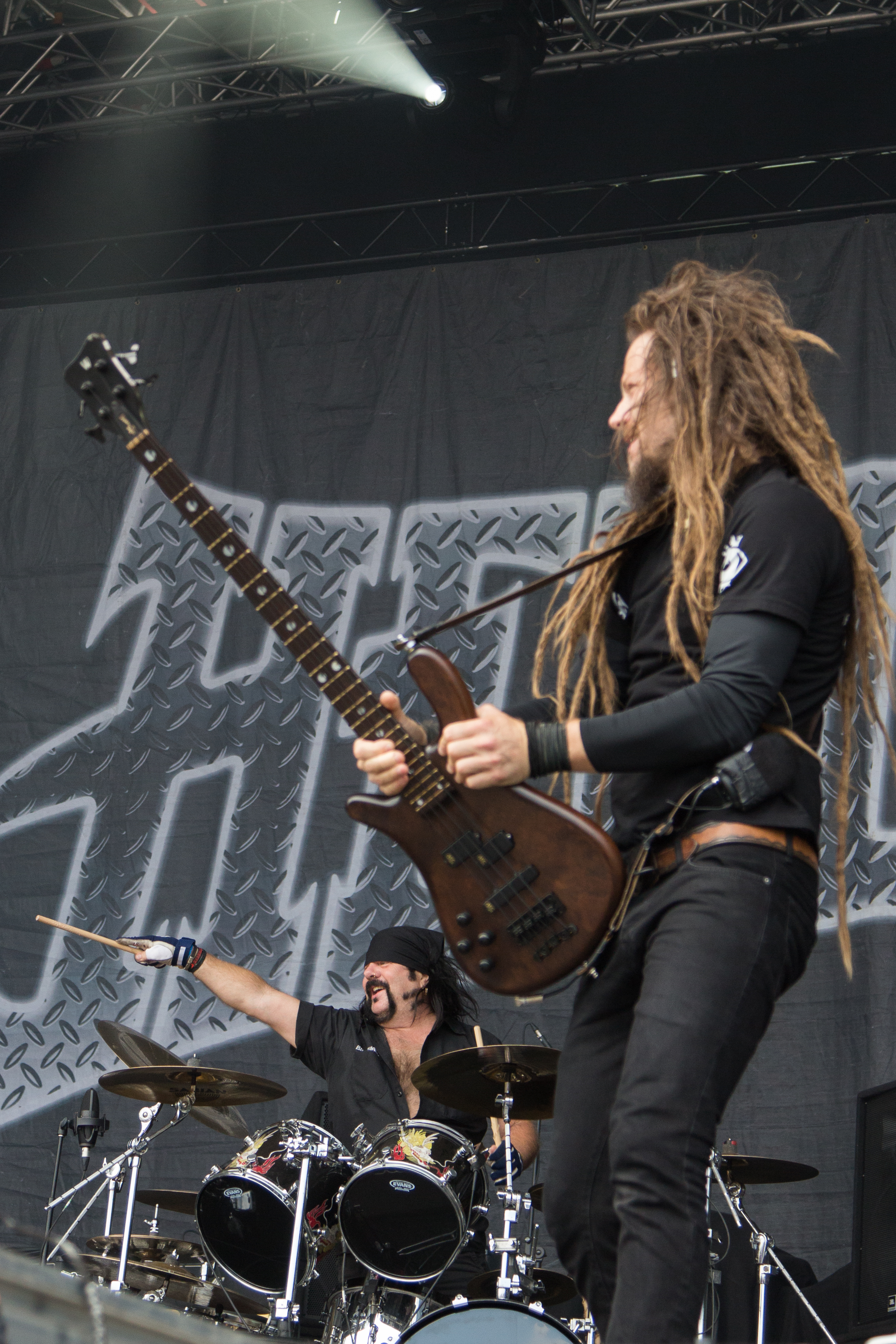
Sanders and Vinnie Paul performing with Hellyeah at See-Rock Festival 2014

Sanders is the owner of Let There Be Rock School, where students from ages 5–70 are taught, as well as BlackStrap Rock Hall, a music venue geared specifically towards rock and metal; both are located in Gainesville, Georgia. He said that he founded this venture to get away from his touring life.

== Discography ==
- Piece Dogs – Exes for Eyes (1992)
- Medication – Prince Valium (2002)
- Medication – Medication EP (2002)
- Medication – "Inside" (2002)
- Bloodsimple – A Cruel World (2005)
- Bloodsimple – Red Harvest (2007)
- MonstrO – MonstrO (2011)
- MonstrO – "Anchors Up!" (2011)
- Hellyeah – "Sangre Por Sangre / Cross to Bier" (2014)
- Hellyeah – Unden!able (2016)
- Hellyeah – Welcome Home (2019)
- Kerry King – From Hell I Rise (2024)
