= Prince Valium =

Studio album by Medication
- Released: June 18, 2002
- Genre: Alternative metal, post-grunge, nu metal
- Length: 46:55
- Label: Locomotive Music
- Producer: Bill Kennedy, Logan Mader, Chris Vrenna

Prince Valium is the only studio album by American rock band Medication.

== Track listing ==
All songs by Medication except for "Underground", written by Jessicka.

1. Loaded Gun – 2:40
2. Nothing Left – 2:52
3. Something New – 4:38
4. Walk Away – 3:17
5. No Direction – 3:01
6. Underground – 3:46
7. False Idol – 2:32
8. Xanax – 4:51
9. Super Pop – 3:36
10. Now and Again – 3:22
11. Prince Valium – 3:31
12. End of Ends – 2:46
13. Inside – 6:03

== Personnel ==
- Whitfield Crane – vocals
- Logan Mader – guitar, vocals
- Kyle Sanders – bass
- B. Blunt – guitar, vocals
- Josh Freese – drums
