= Blood for Blood (Hellyeah album) =

Studio album by Hellyeah
- Released: June 10, 2014
- Genre: Groove metal, alternative metal
- Length: 46:33
- Label: Eleven Seven
- Producer: Kevin Churko

Hellyeah chronology
Band of Brothers (2012)	Blood for Blood (2014)	Unden!able (2016)

Singles from Blood for Blood
- 1. "Sangre por sangre" Released: March 25, 2014; 2. "Moth" Released: July 14, 2014; 3. "Hush" Released: March 13, 2015

Blood for Blood is the fourth studio album from American groove metal band Hellyeah. Produced by Kevin Churko, the album was released on June 10, 2014, through Eleven Seven Music. Producer Kevin Churko handled the bass duties in the studio due to the departure of Bob Zilla. Vocalist Chad Gray has stated he believes this album to be the band's strongest release.

== Track listing ==
All tracks are written by Tom Maxwell, Chad Gray, and Vinnie Paul, with Kevin Churko, except where noted.

No.	Title	Writer(s)	Length
1.	"Sangre por sangre (Blood for Blood)"		4:34
2.	"Demons in the Dirt"		3:53
3.	"Soul Killer"		3:34
4.	"Moth"		4:51
5.	"Cross to Bier (Cradle of Bones)"	Maxwell; Gray; Paul; Greg Tribbett	3:34
6.	"DMF"		3:50
7.	"Gift"		3:48
8.	"Hush"		3:53
9.	"Say When"		2:55
10.	"Black December"		4:33
Total length:			39:25

Bonus tracks
No.	Title	Writer(s)	Length
11.	"Feast or Famine"	Maxwell; Gray; Paul; Tribbett	3:21
12.	"Hush (Acoustic)"		3:53
Total length:			46:39

== Personnel ==
Hellyeah

- Chad Gray – vocals
- Tom Maxwell – guitars
- Vinnie Paul – drums

Additional personnel

- Kevin Churko – bass, production, engineering, mixing, mastering
- Kane Churko – additional engineering
- Shawn McGhee – additional ProTools
- Jeff Chenault – layout
- David Jackson – photography

== Charts ==
Chart (2014)	Peak position
Billboard 200	18
US Hard Rock Albums (Billboard)	1
US Rock Albums (Billboard)	7
ARIA Albums Chart	41
UK Rock Chart	33

=== Singles ===
Title	Year	Peak chart positions	
Title	Year	US Sales	US Main. Rock
"Sangre por sangre (Blood for Blood)"	2014	18 (Note: "Sangre por Sangre (Blood for Blood)" and "Cross to Bier (Cradle of Bones)" charted as a double A-side single on the Hot Singles Sales chart in the United States.)	18
"Cross to Bier (Cradle of Bones)"	2014	18	—
"—" denotes a recording that did not chart or was not released in that territory.
