= Knives Out (disambiguation) =

Knives Out is a 2019 film by Rian Johnson.

Knives Out may also refer to:

- Knives Out (film series)
- "Knives Out" (song), a 2001 song by Radiohead
- Knives Out, a 2017 battle royale video game by NetEase
- Knives Out!, an American metal band

== See also ==
- Glass Onion: A Knives Out Mystery, 2022 sequel to the 2019 film
- Wake Up Dead Man: A Knives Out Mystery, a 2025 sequel to the 2019 film
