= Undeniable (Hellyeah album) =

Unden!able

Studio album by Hellyeah
- Released: June 3, 2016
- Genres: Groove metal; alternative metal
- Length: 45:26
- Label: Eleven Seven
- Producer: Kevin Churko

Hellyeah chronology
Blood for Blood (2014)	Unden!able (2016)	Welcome Home (2019)

Singles from Unden!able
- 1. "Human" Released: February 23, 2016; 2. "X" Released: April 29, 2016; 3. "Startariot" Released: May 23, 2016; 4. "I Don't Care Anymore" Released: July 27, 2016; 5. "Love Falls" Released: January 20, 2017

Undeniable (stylized as Unden!able) is the fifth studio album from American heavy metal band Hellyeah. The cover of Phil Collins' "I Don't Care Anymore" features guitar parts from late Pantera member Dimebag Darrell. It was the last studio album released during the founding member Vinnie Paul's lifetime, before his death in 2018.

== Track listing ==
All tracks are written by Hellyeah and Kevin Churko, except "I Don't Care Anymore", written by Phil Collins.

No.	Title	Length
1.	"!"	1:19
2.	"X"	3:31
3.	"Scratch a Lie"	3:57
4.	"Be Unden!able"	3:13
5.	"Human"	3:33
6.	"Leap of Faith"	4:22
7.	"Blood Plague"	3:58
8.	"I Don't Care Anymore" (Phil Collins cover)	4:42
9.	"Live or Die"	3:25
10.	"Love Falls"	4:34
11.	"10-34"	0:27
12.	"Startariot"	3:41
13.	"Grave"	4:48
Total length:		45:31

Bonus tracks
No.	Title	Length
14.	"Demons in the Dirt" (live in Australia 2015)
15.	"Moth" (live in Australia 2015)
16.	"Cross to Bier" (live in Australia 2015)
17.	"Hush" (live in Australia 2015)

== Personnel ==
- Chad Gray – vocals
- Tom Maxwell – rhythm guitar
- Christian Brady – lead guitar
- Kyle Sanders – bass
- Vinnie Paul – drums

Additional personnel

- Dimebag Darrell – lead guitar on "I Don't Care Anymore"

== Charts ==
Chart (2016)	Peak position
Australian Albums (ARIA)	20
Canadian Albums (Billboard)	32
US Billboard 200	25
