= Bob Kakaha =

American bassist

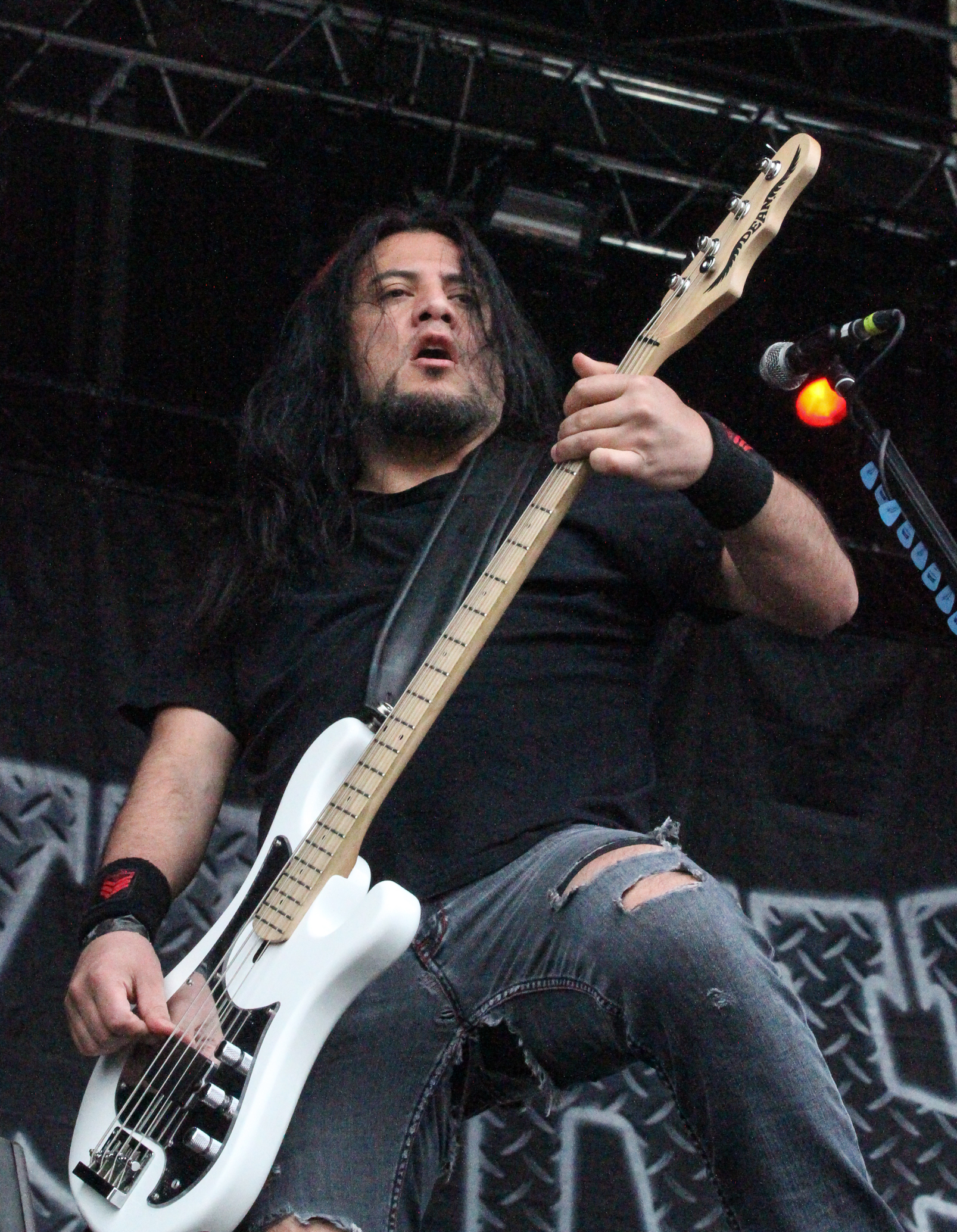
- Kakaha performing with Hellyeah in 2013

Background information
- Also known as: "Bob Zilla"
- Born: Robert Kakaha; March 5, 1970 (age 55)
- Origin: Los Angeles, California, U.S.
- Genres: Alternative metal; groove metal; nu metal
- Occupation: Musician
- Instrument: Bass
- Years active: 1998–present
- Member of: Hush Money; Lowside
- Formerly of: Damageplan; Hellyeah

Robert Kakaha (born March 5, 1970), also known as Bob Zilla, is an American musician who is the bassist for rock band Hush Money. He is best known as the former bassist of heavy metal bands Damageplan and Hellyeah.

== Life and career ==
Kakaha was raised in the Silver Lake neighborhood of Los Angeles. He met Pantera guitarist "Dimebag" Darrell Abbott and drummer Vinnie Paul Abbott through tattooing. He also played with the rap rock band Hellafied Funk Crew, with Shadow Reichenstein, and Vanilla Ice.

=== Damageplan ===
In 2003, the Abbott Brothers formed Damageplan after Pantera's breakup. Kakaha played bass, and former Halford guitarist Patrick Lachman on vocals. Damageplan recorded one album, New Found Power, which was released in February 2004. On December 8, 2004, Dimebag Darrell was shot onstage by former US marine Nathan Gale in Damageplan's tour at Alrosa Villa in Columbus, Ohio. Damageplan was split up after the death of Dimebag Darrell.

=== Hellyeah ===
Three years later, Kakaha joined Hellyeah after original bassist Jerry Montano was dismissed from the band for violent behavior. Kakaha was brought in to play bass guitar on tour for all of 2007.

On February 13, 2014, it was announced that Kakaha had parted ways with the band.

=== Hush Money ===
In January 2015, Kakaha joined Hush Money, a rock band from Dallas, Texas.

== Personal life ==
Kakaha is a resident of Dallas, Texas, where he tattoos at Cedar Springs Tattoo in Oak Lawn, Dallas.

== Discography ==
=== Damageplan ===
- New Found Power (2004)

=== Hellyeah ===
- Stampede (2010)
- Band of Brothers (2012)
