= Band of Brothers (Hellyeah album) =

Studio album by Hellyeah
- Released: July 17, 2012
- Genre: Groove metal alternative metal
- Length: 45:13
- Label: Eleven Seven

Hellyeah chronology
Stampede (2010)	Band of Brothers (2012)	Blood for Blood (2014)

Singles from Band of Brothers
- 1. "War in Me" Released: April 3, 2012; 2. "Band of Brothers" Released: May 8, 2012; 3. "Drink Drank Drunk" Released: September 25, 2012

Professional ratings
Review scores
Source	Rating
About.com	4/5 stars
AllMusic	3/5 stars
Artistdirect	5/5 stars
Blabbermouth.net	7.5/10

Band of Brothers is the third studio album by American heavy metal band Hellyeah. The album was released on July 17, 2012, under record label Eleven Seven Music. Two singles from the album have been released: "War in Me" was released on April 3, 2012, and title track, "Band of Brothers", was released on May 8, 2012. This is the last album to feature guitarist Greg Tribbett and bassist Bob Zilla.

== Track listing ==
All tracks are written by Hellyeah, except where noted.

No.	Title	Length
1.	"War in Me"	3:35
2.	"Band of Brothers"	4:45
3.	"Rage/Burn"	4:41
4.	"Drink Drank Drunk"	3:56
5.	"Bigger God"	4:39
6.	"Between You and Nowhere"	4:16
7.	"Call It Like I See It"	4:00
8.	"Why Does It Always"	3:20
9.	"WM Free"	5:02
10.	"Dig Myself a Hole"	3:15
11.	"What It Takes to Be Me"	3:31
Total length:		45:13

Bonus track
No.	Title	Length
12.	"High 'n' Dry" (Def Leppard cover)	3:26
Total length:		48:39

== Personnel ==
- Chad Gray – vocals
- Greg Tribbett – lead guitar
- Tom Maxwell – rhythm guitar
- Bob Zilla – bass
- Vinnie Paul – drums
