= MonstrO =

American rock band

- Origin: Atlanta, Georgia, U.S.
- Genres: Hard rock, psychedelic rock, alternative rock, heavy metal
- Years active: 2009–present
- Members: Bevan Davies; Kyle Sanders; Juan Montoya; Charlie Suarez

MonstrO was an American rock band composed of drummer Bevan Davies (formerly of Comes with the Fall and Danzig), lead guitarist Juan Montoya (formerly of Torche), singer/rhythm guitarist Charlie Suarez, and bassist Kyle Sanders.

They formed in late 2009 in Atlanta, Georgia and played their first gig in April 2010. The band drew upon music such as 1960s psychedelia, shoegaze, and heavy metal, as well as other personal influences. They signed with Vagrant Records in March 2011. Their self-titled debut album was released in August 2011, produced by William DuVall. They toured as the opening act for Clutch in 2012, and toured regularly until breaking up in 2013. Kyle Sanders joined heavy metal band Hellyeah in 2014 and remained with that band until it went on hiatus in 2021.

== Members ==
- Bevan Davies – drums
- Kyle Sanders – bass, vocals
- Juan Montoya – lead guitar
- Charlie Suarez – rhythm guitar, vocals

== Discography ==
- MonstrO (2011, Vagrant Records)
