= Welcome Home (Hellyeah album) =

Studio album by Hellyeah
- Released: September 27, 2019
- Recorded: May–June 2018
- Studios: Touchwood Studios, Regina, Canada
- Genres: Groove metal; alternative metal
- Length: 36:26
- Label: Eleven Seven
- Producer: Kevin Churko

Hellyeah chronology
Unden!able (2016)	Welcome Home (2019)

Singles from Welcome Home
- 1. "Welcome Home" Released: May 17, 2019

Welcome Home is the sixth and final studio album by American heavy metal band Hellyeah. It was released on September 27, 2019, and is the last album to feature drummer and founding member Vinnie Paul who died after recording sessions were complete but before the album’s release. Welcome Home was also the last album Hellyeah released before going on hiatus in 2021.

== History ==
On March 14, 2019, the band announced a new album would be released on June 28, and the song "333" was also released.

On May 13, the band announced drummer Roy Mayorga would replace Vinnie Paul as the new tour drummer for Hellyeah, while also announcing "Welcome Home" as the title of their next album, with a new release date of September 27, 2019.

On May 17, a music video for the single and title track "Welcome Home" was released.

On June 28, the music video for "Oh My God" was released.

On August 8, E7 Music made the song "Perfect" available on YouTube.

On September 13, the song, "Black Flag Army" was released with a music video.

== Critical reception ==
Wall of Sound scored the album 7/10 and stated: "With such a solid offering like Welcome Home, the next chapter of the band will be interesting to watch, and I'm sure Vinnie Paul's spirit will be behind them". Kerrang! scored the album 4/5, calling it "a wonderful time, and a fitting farewell to an irreplaceable metal hero". Loudwire named it one of the 50 best rock albums of 2019.

== Track listing ==
All songs written by Chad Gray, Christian Brady, Tom Maxwell, Kyle Sanders, Vinnie Paul and Kevin Churko.

Welcome Home track listing
No.	Title	Length
1.	"333"	3:16
2.	"Oh My God"	4:12
3.	"Welcome Home"	4:32
4.	"I'm the One"	3:12
5.	"Black Flag Army"	3:11
6.	"At Wick's End"	3:58
7.	"Perfect"	3:21
8.	"Bury You"	3:17
9.	"Boy"	3:09
10.	"Skyy and Water"	3:26
11.	"Irreplaceable" (audio recording of Vinnie Paul)	0:52
Total length:		36:26

== Personnel ==
- Chad Gray – vocals
- Tom Maxwell – rhythm guitar
- Christian Brady – lead guitar
- Kyle Sanders – bass
- Vinnie Paul – drums

=== Additional personnel ===
- Kevin Churko – producing, recording, engineering, editing, mixing, mastering
- Tristan Hardin – additional recording and editing
- Khloe Churko – general assistance and studio management
- Steffen Orozco – additional editing
- Bob Varo – additional editing
- Sterling Winfield – pre-production

== Charts ==
Chart performance for Welcome Home
Chart (2019)	Peak position
Australian Albums (ARIA)	25
Swiss Albums (Schweizer Hitparade)	83
US Billboard 200	57
