= DCide =

American independent record label

DCide

DCide is a privately held, Washington, D.C. based independent record label and distributor. The label was started in summer of 1995 by founding partners Jeffrey B. Clyburn, Burton Gray and Mark Thorp. Their first act Nothingface sold over 500,000 records worldwide and is widely recognized as one of the standard-bearers for the new metal genre. In 2002, DCide entered into a partnership with Geffen Records to release the debut record from TRUSTcompany out of Montgomery, Alabama. TRUSTcompany's guitar driven rock evokes memories of the Smashing Pumpkins with Deftones-like vocal stylings and bottom heavy riffing reminiscent of Led Zeppelin. TRUSTcompany enjoyed both critical and commercial success as their debut album "The Lonely Position of Neutral" went on to be certified Gold.

TRUSTcompany’s sophomore record "True Parallels" was released by DCide/Geffen in March 2005. In 2009, DCide/Templar Label Group released the debut EP's from Shabazz Palaces, the new project from Ishmael Butler, the creator, rapper and producer for the Grammy award winning rap group Digable Planets. DCide began its relationship with Butler with its 2003 release of his first post Digable Planets project, Cherrywine. In 2011, DCide will release "Well-Done" a collaboration album by Action Bronson and Statik Selektah.

== See also ==
- List of record labels
