= Nothingface (band) =

American metal band

- Nothingface in 2000

Background information
- Origin: Washington D.C., U.S.
- Genres: Nu metal; alternative metal
- Years active: 1994–2004; 2005–2009
- Labels: DCide; TVT; S6
- Past members: Matt Holt; Tom Maxwell; Bill Gaal; Chris Houck; David Gabbard; Jerry Montano; Tommy Sickles

Nothingface was an American alternative metal band from Washington, D.C., formed in 1994. Their best-known and most prolific line-up consisted of Matt Holt (vocals), Tom Maxwell (guitar), Bill Gaal (bass) and Chris Houck (drums). They disbanded in 2004, only to reform the following year, reuniting with Gaal and Houck, and then disband four years later. In 2017, singer Holt died from a degenerative disease.

The band released four studio albums: Pacifier (1997), An Audio Guide to Everyday Atrocity (1998), Violence (2000) and Skeletons (2003), achieving moderate success, as evidenced by their 2001 single "Bleeder" peaking at number 32 on the U.S. Mainstream Rock Chart and touring with high-profile acts such as Soulfly, Pantera, and Ministry, as well as the Tattoo the Earth and Ozzfest 2003 tours. Nothingface's studio albums have collectively sold a total of over half a million copies worldwide.

== History ==
=== Early days (1994–1995) ===
Nothingface was originally formed in early 1994. The band's original line-up consisted of vocalist David Gabbard, guitarist Tom Maxwell, bassist Bill Gaal and drummer Chris Houck. The band started when Chris Houck put an ad out in a local magazine called Rox Magazine in Baltimore. Tom Maxwell, who was living in Baltimore at the time, contacted Chris about the ad, and said he was interested in getting together and jamming. Tom sent a tape with music that he had been working on. Chris, who was living with Bill Gaal at the time in Damascus, Maryland, got the tape and they were both impressed with what Tom had sent. From there they got together and jammed on covers of Soundgarden, Alice in Chains, Jane's Addiction and clicked. They released three tapes with this lineup. These demos featured a grunge and hard rock-influenced sound, in contrast to the heavy metal sound the band would become renowned for later on in their career. Gabbard left the band in 1995, due to disagreements over the heavier musical direction Nothingface was heading in. At this point Matt Holt took over singing duties. Matt Holt became a part of the band as a result of Ingredient 17 (Matt and Tommy Sickles' band) who had been recording at Chris and Bill's house in Damascus. Tom Maxwell heard the material Matt had been doing with Ingredient 17 and thought Matt would be a good match to replace Dave. According to Maxwell, this lineup of Nothingface came together on May 5, 1995.

=== Pacifier and An Audio Guide to Everyday Atrocity (1996–1999) ===
The band then recorded a 1995 self-titled album featuring ten songs. DCide then discovered Nothingface, and in 1996, they partially re-recorded the album, with six of the songs featured on their debut album Pacifier, released in February 1997.

The band's second album An Audio Guide to Everyday Atrocity was released on September 22, 1998, via Mayhem Records. The band toured in support of the album throughout the United States with Stuck Mojo, Sam Black Church, Helmet and Ministry.

=== Violence (2000–2002) ===
Two years later, the band released their third album Violence on October 10, 2000. It featured a single called "Bleeder" which peaked at number 32 on the Mainstream Rock chart. The album also peaked at 24 on the Heatseekers Chart and 37 on the Top Independent Chart. It was the band's most successful album, and their first under the semi-major label TVT Records. Chris Houck recorded drums for this album but had to leave the group due to medical issues that would prevent him from touring. He was replaced by Tommy Sickles of Ingredient 17 (Matt and Tommy's band before Nothingface).

In early 2001, Bill Gaal left the group to pursue a career in music production and engineering. He was replaced by Jerry Montano, formerly of The Deadlights. A few months later, Gaal returned. During the 2001–02 interval between Violence and their next album, Nothingface experienced significant turmoil with Matt Holt's home burning down, Tom Maxwell's mother dying and bassist Bill Gaal's divorce, leading to the band nearly breaking up.

=== Skeletons and breakup (2003–2004) ===
The band released their fourth album Skeletons on April 22, 2003, via TVT Records. The album is considered their most diverse, featuring some of the band's heaviest as well as most melodic material. That summer, the band played on the second-stage of the popular Ozzfest tour. However, the band dropped off Ozzfest shortly before it ended due to numerous factors, including voice issues experienced by Matt Holt. Nothingface disbanded on February 10, 2004, citing musical differences and lack of support from their label.

=== Reformation and second breakup (2005–2009) ===
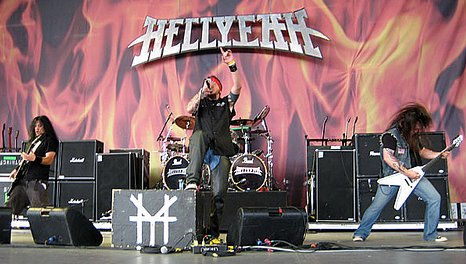
Associated act Hellyeah in 2007

On November 24, 2005, a posting on the Jägermeister website showed Nothingface as the opening act for Disturbed in a 2006 show. The line-up for this show was Matt Holt, Tom Maxwell, Jerry Montano and Tommy Sickles. The band released two new songs online and went on to do a small U.S. club tour that winter/spring, bringing along Crossbreed and Silent Civilian. Jerry Montano was fired from the band after allegedly assaulting Tom Maxwell and making gun threats at Hellyeah's debut album party.

During the first half of April 2008, the band sent out a Myspace bulletin and changed their default profile picture to one of the band in the studio, signaling that they were indeed working on new material. On May 20, they posted a short YouTube clip which features them performing and sent out a Myspace bulletin containing said clip. Four days later, on May 24, it was announced through Blabbermouth.net that original members Bill Gaal and Chris Houck had rejoined Nothingface. with Tommy Sickles now playing drums for the L.A.-based band Noise Within. The band then released several additional "teaser" videos and on February 19, 2009, announced that "the band is at Wrightway Studios in Baltimore MD for the next 2 weeks writing and recording." The re-release of their self-titled album with remastered songs and new artwork was released on April 8, 2009.

On August 14, 2009, it was announced via Blabbermouth.net that Nothingface would be disbanding again. On September 1, 2009, the band released "One Thousand Lies" on their official website. It is a rough "first draft" demo and was recorded in March 2008. On November 13, 2009, the band uploaded "D2" which is another rough "first draft" demo with no vocals. In early 2011, the band launched their brand new website Nothingface.com. Videos linked to YouTube were present so was a Nothingface wiki, forum, guest book, photo gallery and a section for fans to upload their own videos of Nothingface music. Links to other bands were present also. The website has since been suspended for unknown reasons.

=== Aftermath and death of Matt Holt (2010–2017) ===
In a Talk Toomey podcast interview on October 3, 2016, former guitarist Tom Maxwell stated that a Nothingface reunion is "not gonna happen" and that he and Holt "don't get along". Maxwell elaborated by stating that "there's just nothing anymore. There's no communication, there's no desire."

On April 15, 2017, Matt Holt died aged 39 from a degenerative disease. On May 6, 2017, Maxwell, Gaal and Tommy Sickles reunited at a Knives Out! concert to perform the Nothingface song "For All the Sin" (with Todd Smith of Dog Fashion Disco on vocals) as a tribute to Holt.

== Other projects ==
Bill Gaal went on to form Kingdom of Snakes with former members of the band Gunfighter. Their debut EP features vocal work from Matt Holt on one track. In early 2004, Gaal and Holt announced the formation of a new band called Perfect Enemy, while Tom Maxwell and Tommy Sickles announced the formation of Coldwhitechrist with Jerry Montano and Chad Gray, whose tenure was short-lived due to prior commitments. The trio later announced the formation of Sever, which later became Blessed in Black and also included ex-Skrape vocalist Billy Keeton. Keeton eventually left in late 2005 and the band dissolved.

In 2005, guitarist Tom Maxwell and then-bassist Jerry Montano began a band called Hellyeah with Vinnie Paul, formerly of Pantera and Damageplan, as well as Chad Gray and Greg Tribbett of Mudvayne. They released their debut album on April 10, 2007, via Epic Records. After making drunken gun-threats at the album release party, Jerry Montano was subsequently fired from Hellyeah.

== Musical style and influences ==
Nothingface has been most commonly described as alternative metal and nu metal. The band's first album Pacifier in 1997 featured a sound that was compared to nu metal band Korn. Some critics described it as a "Korn clone". Although with their second album An Audio Guide to Everyday Atrocity, they abandoned that sound and featured the nu metal sound they became known for, continuing on their next releases. Some critics deny that Nothingface is a nu metal band due to their use of guitar solos and absence of elements from hip-hop and other characteristics featured in nu metal. The band's sound consists of aggressive heavy metal guitar riffs, screamed vocals, and melodic singing. Singer Matt Holt's melodic and grunge-esque singing has been compared to Eddie Vedder of Pearl Jam and the vocals of Alice in Chains. Critics have praised Holt's singing style for being able to mix harshness with accessibility. Jennifer Slivka of the Daily Collegian, noting that Nothingface "don't rap" and "don't sound like Korn", distinguished Nothingface from the band's contemporaries: "Their music is loud and aggressive, recalling more of the older metal bands like Pantera. However, there are many times when the melody will shift midway through a song, giving way to vocal harmonies much like that of Alice in Chains." In 1999, Paul Lee of Lollipop, categorizing Nothingface as metalcore, described the band as "Earth Crisis-meets-Fugazi". Lee also wrote that Nothingface "have chops comparable to Rush or King Crimson."

Matt Holt cites Maryland heavy metal bands Dog Fashion Disco, Spirit Caravan, and Meatjack as influences. Tom Maxwell came from the Baltimore heavy metal scene. Holt and Tommy Sickles "came from more of the D.C. indie, straight-edge kind of thing, where" the two of them would see bands like Fugazi and other bands signed to Dischord Records. Holt's other influences also include Clutch, Minor Threat, Bad Brains, and Shudder to Think. Holt also said that Nothingface's "influences range from Patsy Cline to Slayer". He then said: "We listen to a lot of music and very little of it is what would be termed 'heavy' music."

== Members ==
Final lineup

- Tom Maxwell – guitar (1993–2004, 2005–2009)
- Matt Holt – lead vocals (1995–2004, 2005–2009; died 2017)
- Bill Gaal – bass, programming, backing vocals (1993–2001, 2001–2004, 2007–2009)
- Chris Houck – drums (1993–2000, 2008–2009)

Former

- David Gabbard – vocals (1993–1995)
- Jerry Montano – touring bass (2001, 2005–2006)
- Tommy Sickles – drums (2000–2004, 2005–2008)

Timeline

== Discography ==
=== Albums ===
List of studio albums, with selected chart positions and sales figures
Title	Album details	Peak chart positions			Sales
Title	Album details	US	US Heat.	US Ind.	Sales
Nothingface (demo)	Released: 1995; Label: Self-released; Format: CD, LP	—	—	—	
Pacifier	Released: February 6, 1997; Label: DCide; Format: CD, CS	—	—	—	
An Audio Guide to Everyday Atrocity	Released: September 22, 1998; Label: DCide; Format: CD, CS	—	—	—	
Violence	Released: September 5, 2000; Label: TVT; Format: CD, CS	—	24	27	US: 87,000
Skeletons	Released: April 22, 2003; Label: TVT; Format: CD	125	3	7	
"—" denotes a recording that did not chart or was not released in that territory.

=== Singles ===
List of singles, with selected chart positions, showing year released and album name
Title	Year	Peak chart positions	Album
Title	Year	US Main.	Album
"Pacifier"	1997	—	Pacifier
"The Sick"	1999	—	An Audio Guide to Everyday Atrocity
"Bleeder"	2001	32	Violence
"For All the Sin"	2001	—	Violence
"Ether"	2003	—	Skeletons
"—" denotes a recording that did not chart or was not released in that territory.

=== Music videos ===
- "Pacifier" (1996)
- "Defaced" (1997)
- "Breathe Out" (1998)
- "Ether" (2003)

== Soundtrack appearances ==
- "Bleeder" was featured on the 3000 Miles to Graceland soundtrack (2001)
- "Ether" was featured on the Freddy vs. Jason soundtrack (2003)
- "Down In Flames" was featured on The Texas Chainsaw Massacre soundtrack (2003)

== Unreleased songs ==
With David Gabbard

Year	Song	Length	Album
1993	"On the Edge"	3:11	Braid
1993	"Prayer"	5:42	Braid
1993	"Confusion (Ultra Sane)"	6:04	Braid
1993	"Damage"	3:04	Braid
1993	"Fast as Fuck"	4:16	Braid
1993	"Circle"	3:20	Braid
1994	"Mommi"	5:08	Thicker
1994	"Insane"	3:32	Thicker
1994	"Mrs. Greedy"	4:42	Thicker
1994	"Instant G"	3:05	Thicker
1994	"Dry"	4:01	Thicker
1994	"Blood"	4:50	Thicker
1994	"On the Edge (Newer Version)"	3:11	The Architect of So Much Evil
1994	"Instant G (Newer Version)"	3:16	The Architect of So Much Evil
1994	"Mommi (Newer Version)"	5:24	The Architect of So Much Evil
1994	"Evil Man"	4:35	The Architect of So Much Evil
1994	"Hate You"	4:21	The Architect of So Much Evil
1994	"Piss"	4:00	The Architect of So Much Evil
1994	"Circle (Newer Version)"	3:20	The Architect of So Much Evil
1994	"Grave"	3:49	The Architect of So Much Evil

With Matt Holt

Year	Song	Length	Album
1996	"Carousel"	4:04	1995 Self-titled album
1996	"Deprive"	3:14	1995 Self-titled album
1996	"Godkill"	4:07	1995 Self-titled album
1996	"Severed"	4:56	1995 Self-titled album
1997	"3 Rooms"	2:55	Audio Guide Demo
1997	"Peeling Skynard"	N/A	Audio Guide Demo
1999	"How Long"	4:26	Violence Demo
2001	"Everything I Hate"	3:58	Skeletons Demo
2002	"The Principles of Gangsterism"	3:14	Skeletons Demo
2002	"In the Wake Of"	4:18	Skeletons Demo
2005	"Walking on Bodies"	3:38	Demo 2005
2005	"Let It Burn"	2:44	Demo 2005
2005	"Pain"	N/A	Demo 2005
2008	"One Thousand Lies"	4:16	2008 Demos
2008	"The End"	1:25	2008 Demos
2008	"D2"	3:07	2008 Demos
