= Sterling Winfield =

American music producer (born 1970)

Sterling Winfield (born January 14, 1970) is an American record producer. He has worked with metal band Pantera on several albums, including Reinventing the Steel (2000). He also co-produced the post-Pantera band Damageplan's 2004 debut album, New Found Power. In 2007, he worked with Vinnie Paul's new supergroup Hellyeah on their self-titled debut album.
