= Tom Maxwell (guitarist) =

American guitarist (born 1968)

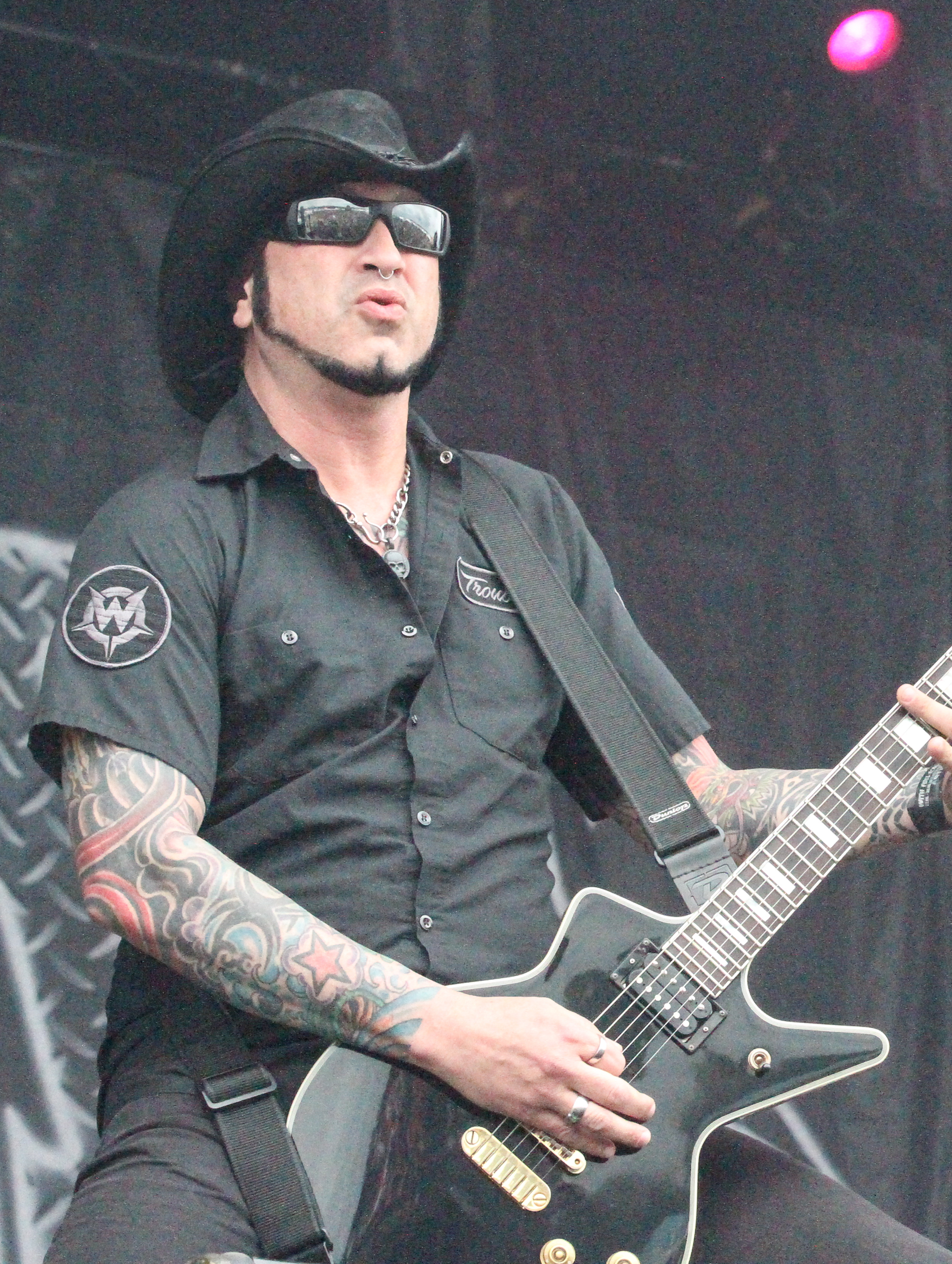
- Maxwell performing in 2013

Background information
- Born: Thomas Maxwell; June 25, 1968 (age 58); Baltimore, Maryland, U.S.
- Genres: Alternative metal; groove metal; nu metal
- Occupation: Guitarist
- Years active: 1988–present
- Member of: Knives Out!
- Formerly of: Nothingface; Have Mercy; Hellyeah

Thomas Maxwell (born June 25, 1968) is an American musician who is the rhythm guitarist of heavy metal supergroup Hellyeah and the lead guitarist of alternative metal band Knives Out! Previous bands include Nothingface, in which he was a founding member, and Have Mercy, a 1980s thrash metal band. His style of playing and writing relies more on grooves and hooks rather than shredding and fast soloing.

== Early life ==
Maxwell was born on June 25, 1968, in Baltimore, Maryland. He got his first guitar, a 1969 Gibson Les Paul, when he was eight years old. According to Maxwell, he still owns it.

== Career ==
=== Nothingface ===
The band started when drummer Chris Houck put an ad out in a local magazine called Rox Magazine in Baltimore. Tom Maxwell, who was living in Baltimore at the time, contacted Chris about the ad, and said he was interested in getting together and jamming. Tom sent a tape with music that he had been working on. Chris, who was living with Bill Gaal at the time in Damascus, Maryland, got the tape and they were both impressed with what Tom had sent. From there they got together and jammed on covers of Soundgarden, Alice in Chains, Jane's Addiction and clicked.

=== Hellyeah ===
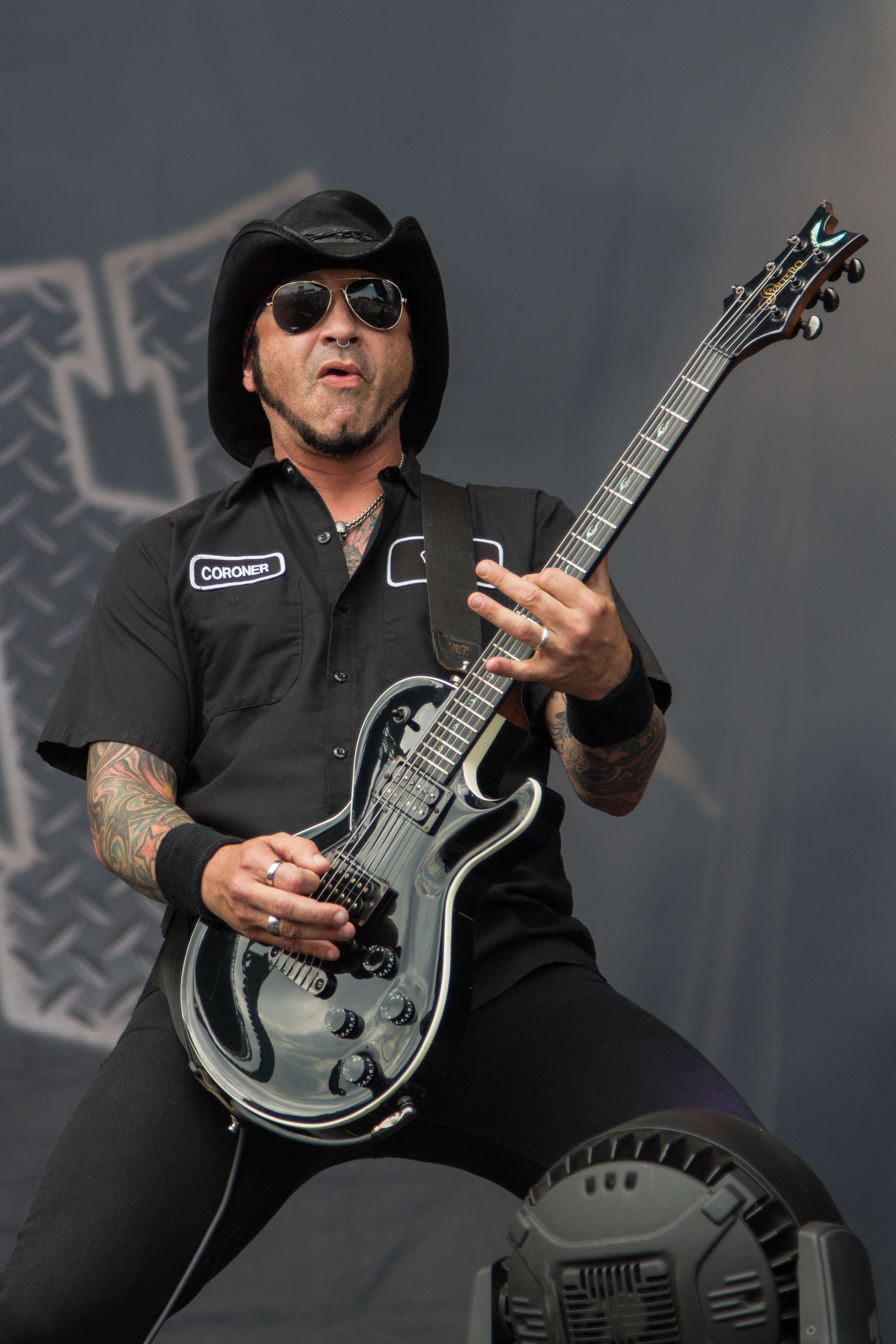
Maxwell performing in 2014

Maxwell became friends with Mudvayne's lead vocalist Chad Gray, and they talked about the possibility of forming a supergroup. The following year, Nothingface toured with Mudvayne and talks to form the supergroup continued, although were constantly put on hold due to scheduling conflicts. At this time, Gray and Maxwell had brainstormed five band names.

Mudvayne guitarist Greg Tribbett approached Maxwell "out of the blue" and wanted to join the band. Nothingface drummer Tommy Sickles originally helmed the drum kit for the band's demo, however, things did not work out and the search for a new drummer began. The band knew former Pantera and Damageplan drummer Vinnie Paul, and tried to persuade him to join the band as their drummer. Originally, Paul was not sure if he would return to music after the death of his brother, Dimebag Darrell and an 18-month hiatus: "It was one of those things that I didn't think I'd be a part of this ever again without him, and after about a year and a half had gone by, these guys called me up, Chad [Gray] and Tom [Maxwell], they were like, 'We're thinking about putting this band together, would you be into it?' First couple of times, I told them, 'No, I don't think I'm ready to do this yet.' And they just were real persistent, they kept calling me. And one night, I had been drinking some red wine and listening to some KISS on 12" vinyl record and I said, 'You know what, lets take a shot at this, lets see what happens.'"

The band's persistence paid off and Paul joined the project. Paul commented about joining the project: "Everybody had their head in the right place and that let's-tear-the-world-a-new-ass attitude".

== Personal life ==
When not touring, he resides in Maryland with his wife and son.

== Discography ==
=== With Nothingface ===
- Pacifier (1996)
- An Audio Guide to Everyday Atrocity (1998)
- Violence (2000)
- Skeletons (2003)

=== With Hellyeah ===
- Hellyeah (2007)
- Stampede (2010)
- Band of Brothers (2012)
- Blood for Blood (2014)
- Unden!able (2016)
- Welcome Home (2019)

=== With Knives Out! ===
- The Rough Cuts EP (2010)
- Black Mass Hysteria (2012)
