= Hellyeah =

American heavy metal supergroup

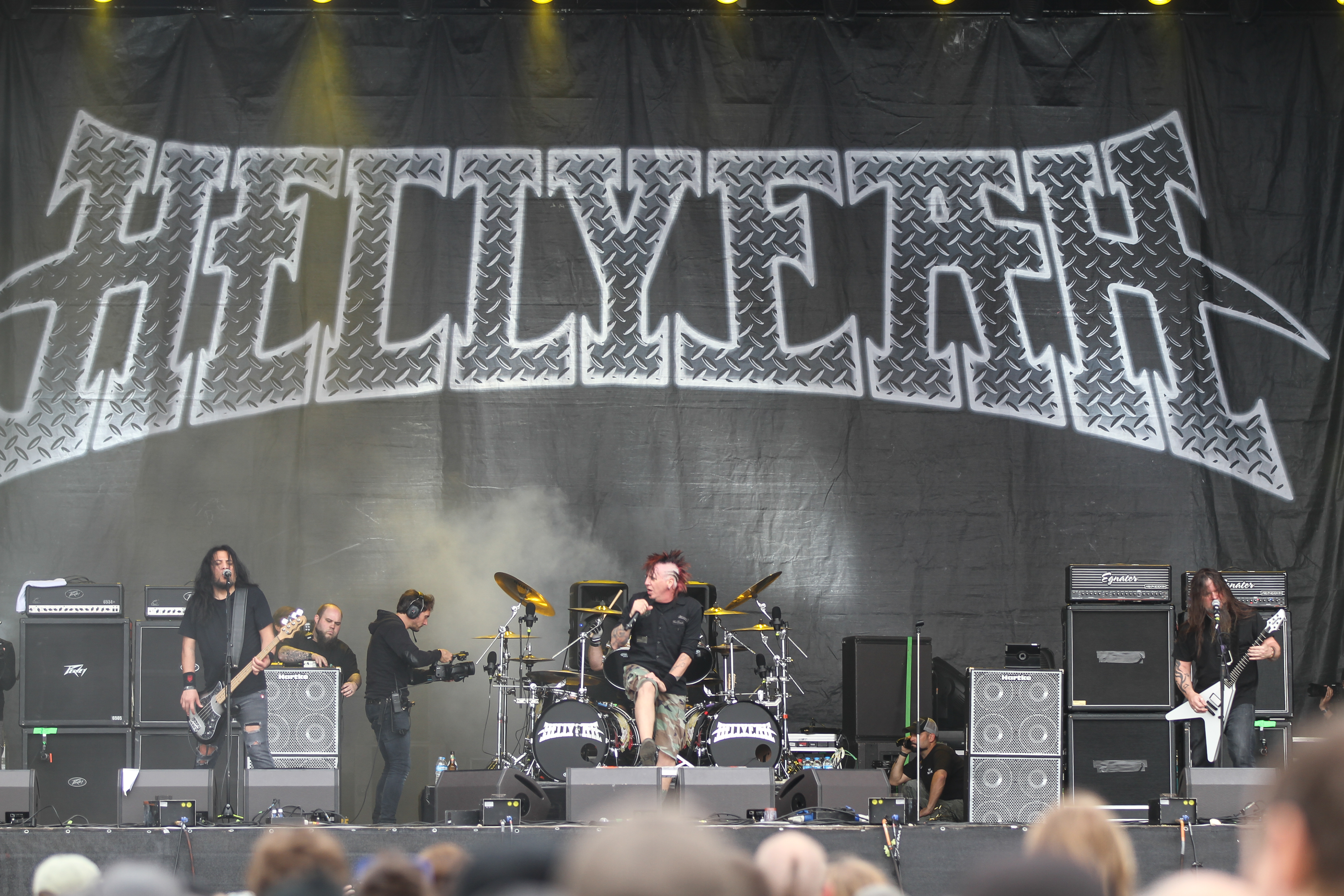
- Hellyeah performing at With Full Force in 2013

Background information
- Origin: Dallas, Texas, U.S.
- Genres: Groove metal; alternative metal
- Years active: 2006–2021 (indefinite hiatus)
- Labels: Eleven Seven; Epic
- Spinoff of: Mudvayne; Damageplan; Nothingface
- Past members: Chad Gray; Christian Brady; Tom Maxwell; Kyle Sanders; Roy Mayorga; Vinnie Paul; Greg Tribbett; Bob Zilla; Jerry Montano
- Website: hellyeahband.com

Hellyeah (stylized as HELLYEAH) was an American heavy metal supergroup formed in Dallas, Texas, in 2006. The band's last lineup consisted of lead vocalist Chad Gray, guitarists Christian Brady and Tom Maxwell, bassist Kyle Sanders, and drummer Roy Mayorga. The idea to form a supergroup originated in 2000 on the Tattoo the Earth tour, although plans were constantly put on hold due to scheduling conflicts. The summer of 2006 allowed the band to take the project seriously and record its first album. Recorded at Chasin' Jason studio in Dimebag Darrell's backyard, their self-titled album entered the Billboard 200 at number 9, selling 45,000 copies. They went on to release five more studio albums between 2010 and 2019. As of 2021, the band is on hiatus.

== History ==
=== Formation and early days ===
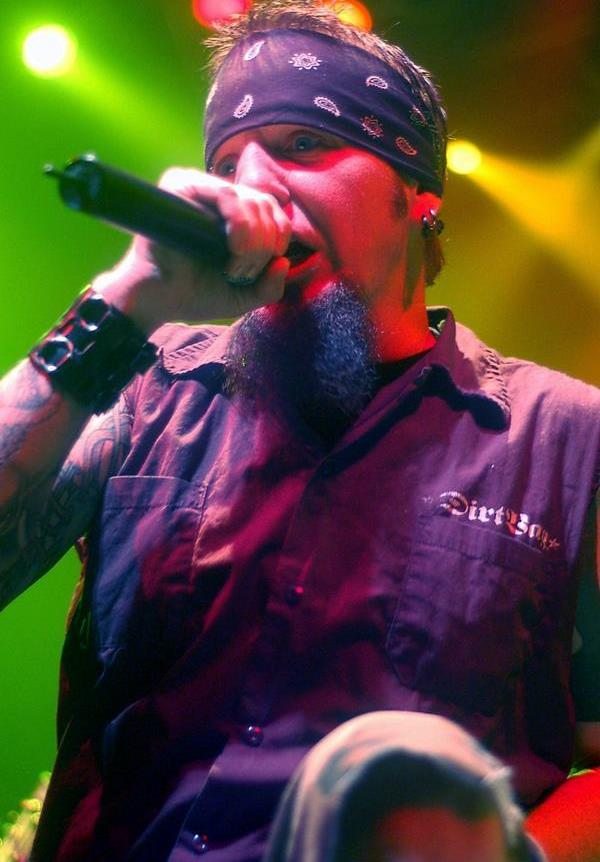
Founding member and vocalist Chad Gray in 2009

Hellyeah's beginnings can be traced back to 2000 on the Tattoo the Earth tour featuring Mudvayne, Nothingface, Slayer, Slipknot, and Sevendust. Nothingface guitarist Tom Maxwell became friends with Mudvayne vocalist Chad Gray, and they talked about the possibility of forming a supergroup. The following year, Nothingface toured with Mudvayne and talks to form the supergroup continued, although were constantly put on hold due to scheduling conflicts. At this time, Gray and Maxwell had brainstormed five band names.

Mudvayne guitarist Greg Tribbett approached Maxwell "out of the blue" and wanted to join the band. Another Nothingface member, bassist Jerry Montano, was also recruited into the project. A third Nothingface member, drummer Tommy Sickles, had originally played drums on their new project’s demo. But the band needed a full-time drummer. Montano was friends with drummer Vinnie Paul, formerly of Pantera and Damageplan. Montano persistently called Paul, trying to persuade him to join the band. Originally, Paul was not sure if he would return to music after the murder of his brother Dimebag Darrell, which led Paul to an 18-month hiatus from the industry. But Montano and the other members kept in contact, and Paul explained being slowly won over. Paul said: "And they just were real persistent, they kept calling me. And one night, I had been drinking some red wine and listening to some Kiss on 12" vinyl record and I said, 'You know what, let's take a shot at this, let's see what happens.'" Paul also admired their anthisiasm, sainting, "Everybody had their head in the right place and that let's-tear-the-world-a-new-ass attitude".

In their previous bands there had only been one guitarist, so having two was a new experience for all members. Paul felt two guitarists brought back the "old school Iron Maiden thing where they play two parts and give you a grinding rhythm part with a badass melody on top". In 2006, Mudvayne did not have any plans to tour and were in hiatus for most of the summer and autumn, while Nothingface was preparing to record their next album. The time over the summer allowed the band to pursue the project which had been talked about for years.

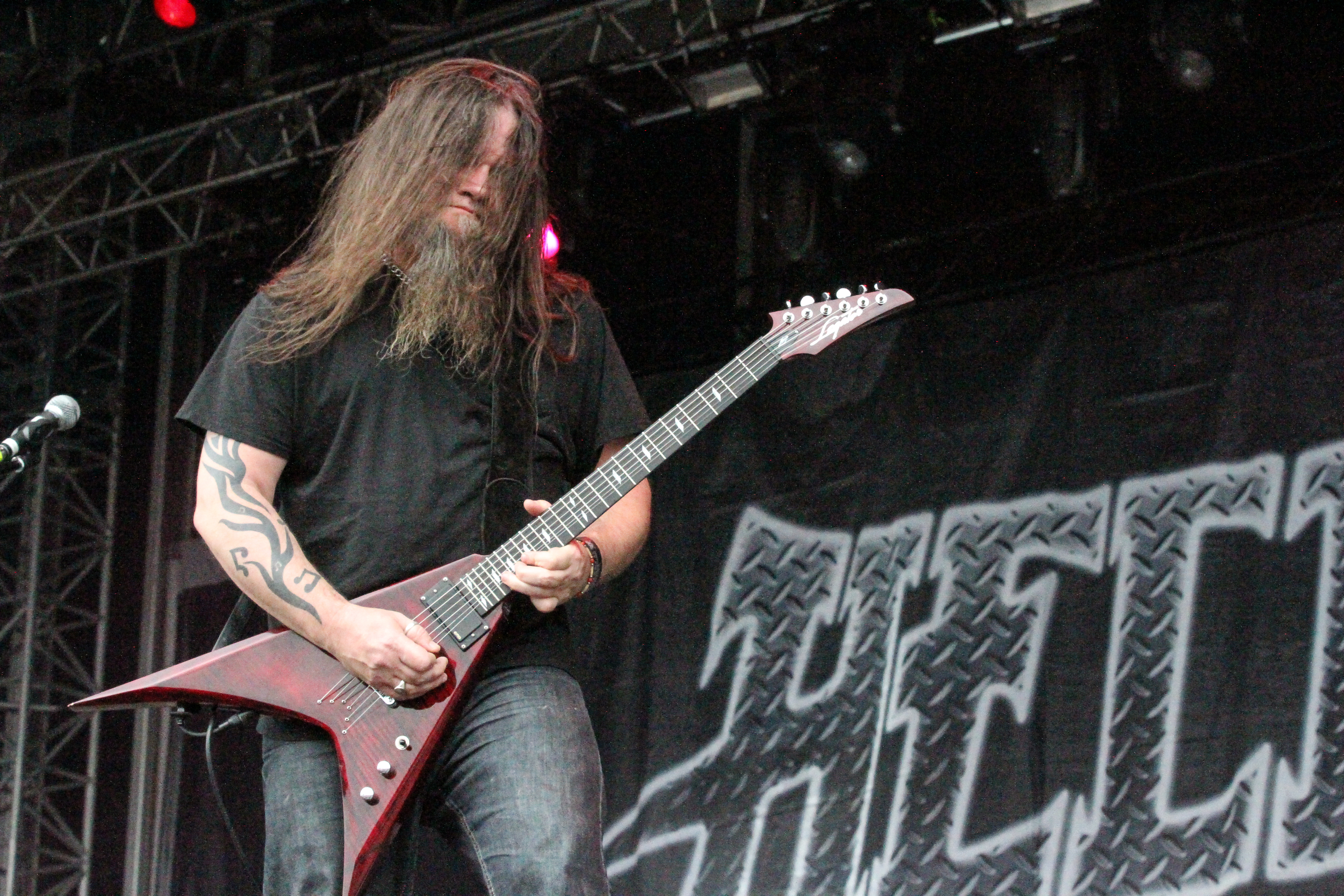
Founding guitarist Greg Tribbett, who was in the band from 2006 until 2014

Gray flew into Baltimore to Nothingface's home studio to discuss the project further. The song "Waging War" was written in two days, followed by Maxwell tracking it the next day, and Gray completing vocals. During the summer of 2006, schedules were clear, which allowed members to take the time to record a studio album. The album was recorded at Paul's backyard studio, Chasin' Jason in Arlington, Texas. Filled with photos of his late brother Dimebag, Paul found it tough entering the studio where the last albums by Damageplan and Pantera, and the collaboration Rebel Meets Rebel were recorded, but felt "the dark cloud that was there went away", due to everyone's positive energy. Maxwell and Tribbett were the primary writers of the album, and Paul was there to "steer them in the right direction", with Gray adding his opinion on musical arrangements.

Paul built the members a cabana style house on his pool deck with air conditioning, a TV, and beds so the members felt comfortable while recording. Paul produced the record and Gray felt Paul "facilitated the whole thing". The album was completed in roughly a month, with three recording sessions. The band worked on the record for eight days and returned home for a break. A 14-day session followed the break, and then another 10 days in the studio. Gray asserts the breaks in between recording sessions were to "re-charge the batteries", and "get a fresh head". As the line-up was complete, the band started to brainstorm names. When a member thought of a name, they would write it on a piece of paper and put it in an amp box outside the studio. Someone wrote "Hellyeah", and the band thought it was a perfect choice. Paul says it's "very affirmative and full of attitude. When your buddy asks if you want to get a beer tonight, you don't just say 'yes,' you say, "Hell yeah!". Gray attributes the name to "late teens, keggers and chicks and AC/DC and Metallica".

=== Hellyeah (2007–2008) ===
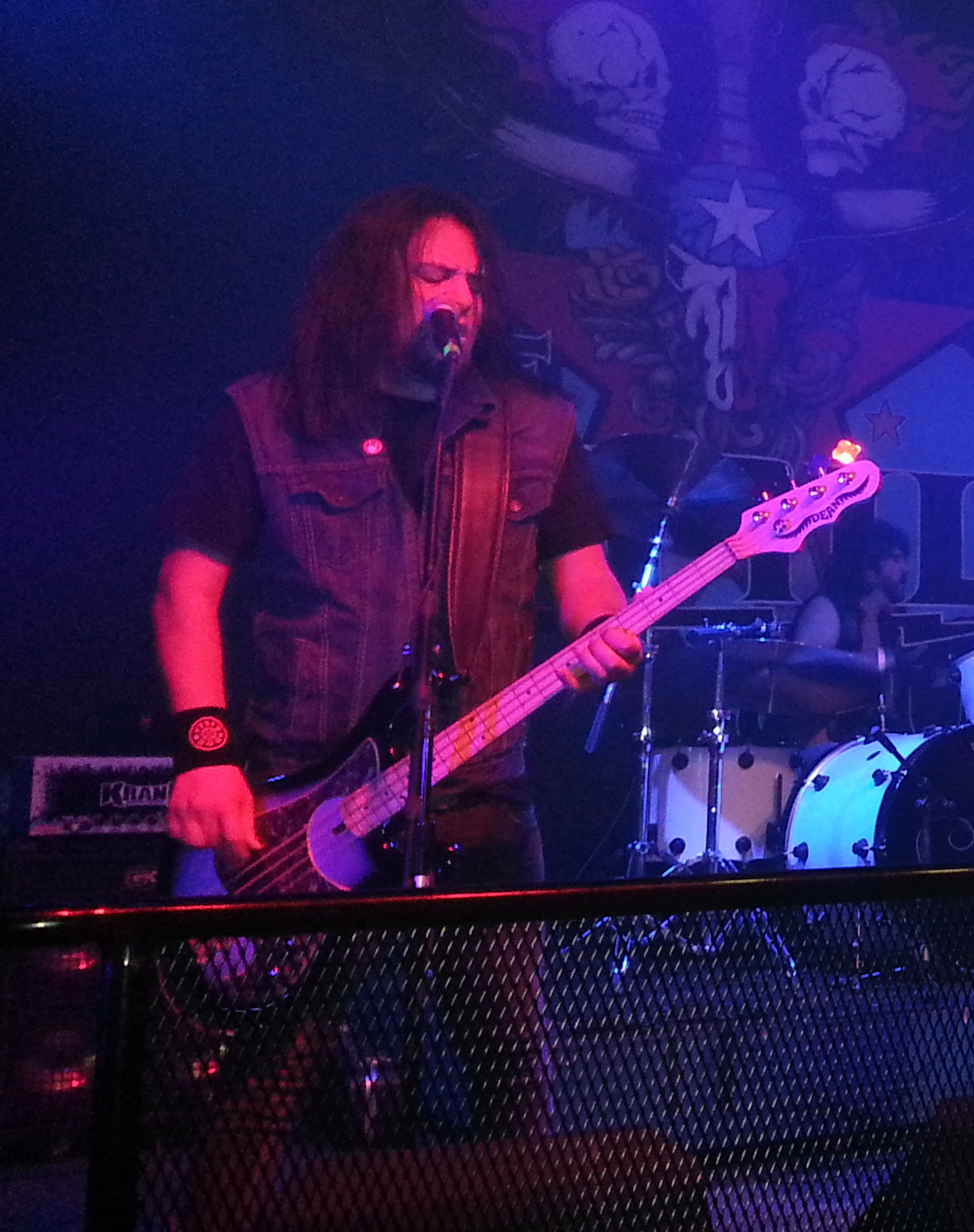
Bassist Bob Zilla, who was with the band from 2007 to 2014

Revolver was one of the first print publications to feature the band in March 2007. The self-titled track, "Hellyeah", started gaining satellite radio airplay in February 2007, and the first single "You Wouldn't Know" hit American radio airwaves the same month. "You Wouldn't Know" peaked at number 5 on the Hot Mainstream Rock Tracks, and 35 on the Hot Modern Rock Tracks. The album's second single, "Alcohaulin' Ass" peaked at number 7 on the Hot Mainstream Rock Tracks. The band's self-titled album, Hellyeah was released on April 10, 2007, via Epic Records. The album debuted at No. 9 on the Billboard 200 album charts, with sales of just under 45,000. The album peaked on the Top Hard Rock albums at number 15, and number 3 on the Top Rock Albums. As of April 27, 2009, the album has sold 354,000 copies in the United States.

Hellyeah received generally positive reviews. William Ruhlmann of Allmusic awarded the album three and a half stars out of five, commenting; "Their album is a competent example of its genre, in which Tribbett and Maxwell combine to create crushing riffs over the pummeling rhythm section of Paul, while Gray howls typically enraged, expletive-littered lyrics to songs". However, Ruhlmann believed the album was fundamentally similar to the musicians’ other bands and not particularly innovative. Blabbermouth.net reviewer Don Kaye awarded the album 7 out of 10, praising the track "Matter of Time" for its slashing main riff, and "One Thing" as it "marches to the finish line with a rumbling, crunching wall of guitars worthy of Dimebag himself". Kaye thought Hellyeah's first studio effort was not equal to any of its members' main output. KNAC contributor Andrew Depedro stated "it's a set of good songs recorded by 5 accomplished musicians from diverse backgrounds not letting their pasts define them and those songs in one form or another speak to you in different ways".

Bassist Montano was asked to leave Hellyeah after the album's release party, where he assaulted guitarist Maxwell and made numerous gun threats while heavily intoxicated. The band's publicist stated Montano’s departure was due to "personal reasons on both sides" The band considered Damageplan bassist Bob Zilla as Paul thought; "It was kind of hard to go ahead and commit to this band without Bob being part of it". Zilla was invited to audition and got the gig immediately.

Hellyeah embarked on their first tour in May 2007 titled Fire it Up, made an appearance at the Download Festival, and underwent Australian tour in July 2007. The Family Values Tour with Korn and Evanescence, saw the band start touring in late July, which also consisted playing with Alter Bridge in San Antonio before passing through thirty cities before ending in Washington, D.C. A DVD titled Below the Belt was released on November 13, 2007, and featured a documentary, music videos, performance footage from the making of the album, first studio sessions, coverage of the band's world tour, and personal interviews. It was produced by members of the band and Ryan Ziemba.

=== Stampede (2009–2010) ===
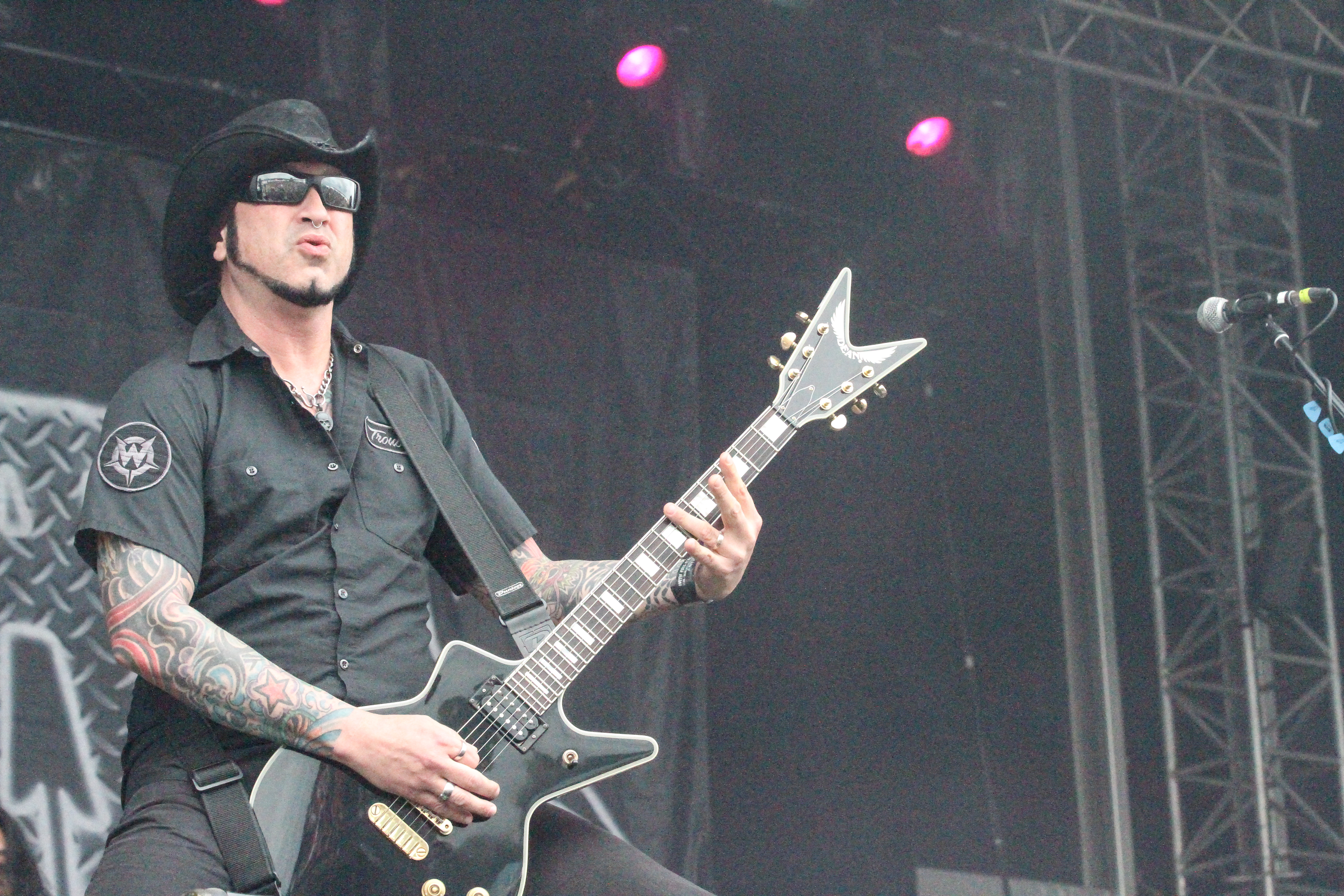
Founding member and rhythm guitarist Tom Maxwell

Hellyeah headlined a tour in the spring of 2010 with: Seether, Five Finger Death Punch, Drowning Pool, and Lacuna Coil. The first date was May 11, 2010 in Madison, WI. They were also confirmed to play the main stage at Download Festival 2010. In 2009, the band revealed that they were in the studio recording a new album, later revealed to be titled Stampede.

For Stampede, the members went to drummer Vinnie Paul's Texas home studio, for a recording process draped in a relaxed, pressure-free atmosphere. "We were doing it at my house solely. We ate, drank and BBQed together, which made the brotherhood that happened, come through in the music," Paul said. The band members lived in bungalows on the grounds and turned Paul's house into a studio. Drums were recorded downstairs and guitars were recorded upstairs, with video screens in each room so the members could see one another while tracking. "It’s a broad, diverse album that covers rock, heavy metal and Southern rock ground. That is the main thing that I like about it: it’s not so focused on one thing," Paul said. The high ceilings at the Paul home allowed for the creation of a big, booming sound. They also were able to work at their own natural pace. "We slept there, so if one of us just came up with an idea, we could jump on it," guitarist Tom Maxwell said.

"Cowboy Way", a song from the new album, was released for a free download via the band's website on April 21, 2010. The music video for "Cowboy Way" premiered on May 20, 2010. The first single, "Hell of a Time", was released on June 1, 2010. The music video for "Hell of a Time" premiered on June 16, 2010. The song "The Debt That All Men Pay" premiered on the Ultimate Guitar Archive on June 22, 2010. Stampede was released on July 13, 2010, via Epic Records and sold 28,000 copies in its first week of release, debuting at No. 8 on the Billboard 200, making it the band's highest-charting album to date.

The group was confirmed to be playing the Rockstar Energy Drink Uproar Festival along with other headliners Disturbed, Avenged Sevenfold, Stone Sour, and Halestorm.

=== Band of Brothers (2011–2012) ===
Hellyeah finished recording a new album, titled Band of Brothers, and were extremely satisfied with the production of the record; which was produced by Jeremy Parker, who has produced albums for Godsmack and Evanescence, and was recorded in the home of drummer Vinnie Paul's studio in Arlington, Texas; VP's Upstairs Studio. Band of Brothers was released on July 17, 2012, via Eleven Seven Music, the band's new record label home after leaving Epic Records. The digital single "War In Me" was released on iTunes on April 3, 2012. Debut single "Band of Brothers" was released in early May with a music video and will be released on iTunes. On May 8, 2012, the band's second single off their third album of the same name, "Band of Brothers" was released.

They played the Download Festival on Sunday June 16, 2013 and played at Graspop Metal Meeting on Sunday June 30, 2013.

In July 2013, they were part of the Gigantour 2013.

=== Lineup changes, Blood for Blood and Unden!able (2013–2016) ===
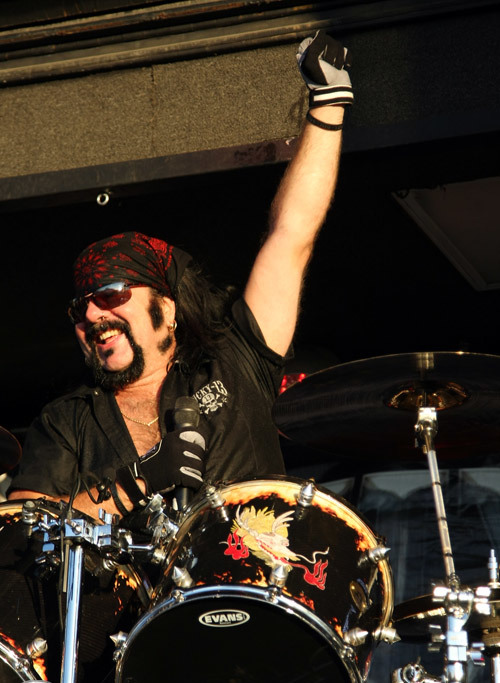
Founding member and drummer Vinnie Paul, who was in the band from 2006 until his death in 2018

In late 2013, the band posted updates to their Facebook page, detailing that they were in the process of writing and recording their next album. A few short clips were posted by the band showing some of the guitar work underway. In 2014, the band announced the track list and title of their album to be Blood for Blood, released on June 10. It was also announced that guitarist Greg Tribbett and bassist Bob "Zilla" Kakaha had departed the band, and were shortly replaced by Christian Brady, ex-guitarist of Magna-Fi and Überschall, and bassist Kyle Sanders, ex-member of Skrew, Bloodsimple, and MonstrO, and brother of Troy Sanders of Mastodon. Hellyeah and Adrenaline Mob have announced a few tour dates together. On June 3, the full album was available for streaming via YouTube.

In 2015, Hellyeah released the official video for the album's third single, "Hush". The song was also used to promote the "No More" campaign against domestic violence.

Slayer was chosen to headline the 2015 Rockstar Energy Mayhem Festival. The bands Hellyeah, King Diamond, The Devil Wears Prada, Thy Art Is Murder, Whitechapel, Jungle Rot, Sister Sin, Sworn In, Shattered Sun, Feed Her to the Sharks, Code Orange & Kissing Candice also participated in the Rockstar Tour. The festival covered 26 stops from June 26 through August 2.

In 2016, the band released a new song called "Human" from their fifth studio album. The album was titled Unden!able and released June 3, 2016. Tom Maxwell has stated that included on the album will be "a lot of stuff they never tried before", calling it "moody, dark and crushing". Included on the album is a cover of "I Don't Care Anymore" by Phil Collins which features archived guitar work from Dimebag Darrell recorded before his death.

=== Welcome Home, Vinnie Paul's death and new drummer (2017–2020) ===
On October 26, 2017, Blabbermouth.net reported that the band would start recording for their sixth studio album in early November.

Vinnie Paul died on June 22, 2018; his cause of death was later announced as dilated cardiomyopathy and coronary artery disease. Paul was last seen in public partying at a rock concert at Beauty Bar Las Vegas hours before his passing. Shortly before his death, Vinnie laid down the drum tracks for Hellyeah's sixth album at The Hideout recording studio in Las Vegas.

On March 14, 2019, the band announced the new album will be released on June 28, and the single "333" was also released.

On May 6, 2019, Hellyeah made the announcement on their official Facebook page that Stone Sour drummer Roy Mayorga would join Hellyeah for their upcoming show on May 11, 2019, celebrating the life of their late drummer Vinnie Paul.

"Please welcome our dear friend and brother Roy Mayorga, who will be guesting behind the drum kit as we honor our brother Vinnie Paul. These men had so much love and mutual respect for each other, this makes our transition so much easier. Ready or not, here we come!"

A week later, the band announced Mayorga as the new drummer for Hellyeah, while also announcing Welcome Home as the title of their new album and that the release date was pushed back to September 27.

=== Hiatus (2021–present) ===
In May 2021, Mayorga revealed during his appearance on The New York Hardcore Chronicles Live! podcast that Hellyeah is currently on hiatus, partly due to Gray's commitments with Mudvayne, who had announced the month before that they were reuniting for their first shows in over a decade.

== Musical style ==
Hellyeah has been categorized as groove metal and alternative metal. The band's late drummer, Vinnie Paul, described the band's sound as "a familiar groove, with a new sound". Blabbermouth.net reviewer Don Kaye commented "with little of the complexity of Mudvayne or angularity of Nothingface and much more of the full-on, pedal-to-the-metal style of Vinnie Paul's previous work". However, Kaye said the songs "Star" and "Thank You" border on musical cliché. Andrew Depedro of KNAC.com stated "'Alcohaulin' Ass' showcases Gray's hidden talent as an outlaw country and western-type crooner in the intro", although he thought the band's lyrics were repetitive.

== Band members ==
Final line-up

- Chad Gray – lead vocals (2006–2021)
- Tom Maxwell – rhythm guitar (2006–2021), lead guitar (2014)
- Christian Brady – lead guitar, backing vocals (2014–2021)
- Kyle Sanders – bass, backing vocals (2014–2021)
- Roy Mayorga – drums (2019–2021)

Former members

- Greg Tribbett – lead guitar, backing vocals (2006–2014)
- Jerry Montano – bass, backing vocals (2006–2007)
- Bob Zilla – bass, backing vocals (2007–2014)
- Vinnie Paul – drums (2006–2018; his death)

Former session musicians

- Kevin Churko – bass (2014)

=== Timeline ===
Recording Timeline

Role	Album					
Role	Hellyeah (2007)	Stampede (2010)	Band of Brothers (2012)	Blood for Blood (2014)	Undeniable (2016)	Welcome Home (2019)
Lead vocals	Chad Gray	Chad Gray	Chad Gray	Chad Gray	Chad Gray	Chad Gray
Lead guitar	Greg Tribbett	Greg Tribbett	Greg Tribbett	Tom Maxwell	Christian Brady	Christian Brady
Rhythm guitar	Tom Maxwell	Tom Maxwell	Tom Maxwell	Tom Maxwell	Tom Maxwell	Tom Maxwell
Bass	Jerry Montano	Bob Zilla	Bob Zilla	Kevin Churko	Kyle Sanders	Kyle Sanders
Drums	Vinnie Paul	Vinnie Paul	Vinnie Paul	Vinnie Paul	Vinnie Paul	Vinnie Paul

== Discography ==
- Hellyeah (2007)
- Stampede (2010)
- Band of Brothers (2012)
- Blood for Blood (2014)
- Undeniable (2016)
- Welcome Home (2019)

== Accolades ==
Association	Year	Category	Nominee(s) / Work	Result	Ref(s)
Loudwire Music Awards	2014	Best Rock Album	Blood for Blood	Nominated	
Loudwire Music Awards	2014	Best Rock Song	"Moth"	Nominated	
Loudwire Music Awards	2014	Best Rock Band	Hellyeah	Nominated	
Loudwire Music Awards	2015	Best Rock Video	"Hush"	Nominated	
Loudwire Music Awards	2017	Best Drummer	Vinnie Paul	Nominated	
