= List of Warner Records artists =

This is a list of artists who have recorded for Warner Records (formerly Warner Bros. Records). A Division of Warner Music Group.
Listed in parentheses are names of Warner-affiliated labels for which the artist recorded.

== 0-9 ==
- 10cc (US)
- 4 Non Blondes
- 4Play (Buu Music/Warner)
- 99 Neighbors

== A ==
- A-ha
- Aaron Goodvin (Warner Music Canada)
- Aaron J Christopher (Warner Music USA)
- Aaron Space
- Abandoned Pools (Extasy International/Warner Bros.)
- Above the Law (Ruthless/Giant/Warner Bros.)
- Adam Lambert
- Adam Mitchell
- Adam Sandler
- Addrisi Brothers
- aespa (SM Entertainment/Warner Bros.) – Korean releases only
- Agnes Chan
- AJR
- Al B. Sure!
- Al Jarreau
- Alanis Morissette (Maverick/Warner Bros.)
- Alex Haley
- Alexa Feser
- Ali Gatie
- Alice Coltrane
- Alice Cooper
- All Saints
- Allan Sherman
- Altered State
- Amanda Ghost
- Amazing Rhythm Aces
- Amber (Tommy Boy/Warner Bros.)
- Ambrosia
- Amelia Lily
- America
- Amy Grant (Word/Curb/Warner Bros.)
- Andraé Crouch
- Angelic Upstarts
- Animaniacs (Rhino/Kid Rhino/Warner Bros.)
- Anita Cochran (Warner Bros. Nashville)
- The Anita Kerr Singers
- Anne-Marie
- Anthony and the Camp
- Antonio Carlos Jobim
- Aphex Twin (Sire/Warner Bros.)
- Apollonia 6
- Arctic Monkeys (Domino/Warner Bros.)
- Arlo Guthrie
- Armor for Sleep
- Arthur Alexander
- Arthur Lowe
- Ash (Record Collection/Warner Bros.)
- Ashford & Simpson
- Ashley McBryde (Warner Music Nashville)
- Ashley Monroe (Warner Bros. Nashville)
- Ashley Tisdale
- Atlantic Starr
- Atlas Genius
- Avenged Sevenfold
- Aztec Camera

== B ==
- B.W. Stevenson
- Baby Ford (Sire/Warner Bros.)
- Braden Eric Warner Records
- Bad Brains (Maverick/Warner Bros.)
- Badfinger
- Bailey Zimmerman (Warner Music Nashville)
- Banda Black Rio (Warner/Atlantic/Elektra/WEA International)
- Bandana (Warner Bros. Nashville)
- Banks & Steelz
- Barenaked Ladies (Reprise/Warner Bros.)
- Baskery
- Bassvictim
- Bat for Lashes
- Battlecat (Maverick/Warner Bros.)
- Baxter (Maverick/Warner Bros.)
- Beaver & Krause
- Bebe Rexha
- Bee Gees
- Béla Fleck
- Bella Poarch
- Ben Lee
- Benson Boone
- Betsy
- Bette Midler
- Biffy Clyro
- Big & Rich (Warner Bros. Nashville)
- Big Daddy Kane (Cold Chillin'/Reprise/Warner Bros.)
- Big Data
- Bill Cosby
- Delia Bell
- Bill Haley & His Comets
- Bill Sims (PBS/Warner Bros.)
- Billy Hill (Reprise/Warner Bros. Nashville)
- Billy Montana (Warner Bros. Nashville)
- Billy Ray Cyrus (Curb/Word/Warner Bros. Nashville)
- Biohazard
- Biz Markie (Cold Chillin'/Warner Bros.)
- Black Sabbath (North America)
- Black Uhuru (Mango/Island/Warner Bros.)
- Blake Shelton (Warner Music Nashville)
- Blonde
- Blur (Parlophone/Warner)
- B.o.B (Grand Hustle/Rebel Rock/Atlantic)
- Bob James (Tappan Zee/Warner Bros.; also reissued material previously released on CTI and Columbia)
- Bob Newhart
- Bobby King
- Body Count (Sire/Warner Bros.)
- Boney James
- Bonnie Prudden
- Bonnie Raitt
- Boom Crash Opera
- Bootsy Collins
- Bootsy's Rubber Band
- Brad Mehldau
- Brady Seals (Warner Bros. Nashville)
- Brandy
- Brandy Clark (Warner Music Nashville)
- Brenda Lee (Warner Bros. Nashville)
- Bren Joy
- Brett Eldredge (Warner Music Nashville)
- Brett Kissel (Warner Music Canada)
- Brian Eno (Opal/Warner Bros.) (US)
- Brian Wilson (Giant/Warner Bros.)
- Bronx Style Bob (Sire/Warner Bros.)
- Brother Sundance
- Brougham
- Bryan Ferry (E.G./Warner Bros.)
- Bugs Bunny
- Built to Spill
- Bulletboys
- bunii
- Burning Spear (Slash/Warner Bros.)

== C ==
- Candi Staton
- Candlebox (Maverick/Sire/Warner Bros.)
- Captain Beyond
- Captain Beefheart and The Magic Band
- Cardiknox
- Carl Stalling
- Carlene Carter (Giant/Warner Bros. Nashville)
- Carlie Hanson
- Carly Simon
- Carmen Electra (Paisley Park/Warner Bros.)
- Carole Davis
- Catherine McGrath
- Cavetown
- Cerrone
- Chad Brock (Warner Bros. Nashville)
- Chad Mitchell
- Chaka Khan
- Charles Wright & the Watts 103rd Street Rhythm Band
- Chase Atlantic
- Chase Matthew (Warner Nashville)
- Cheap Trick
- Cher (US)
- Chester Bennington
- Chic
- Chicago (Full Moon/Warner Bros.)
- Chiddy Bang (Parlophone)
- Chika
- China Crisis (US)
- Chino XL
- Chris Janson (Warner Music Nashville)
- Christine McVie
- Christopher Cross
- Ciara
- Cibo Matto
- Citizen King
- CJ
- Clay Walker (Giant/Warner Bros. Nashville)
- Cleopatra (Maverick/Warner Bros.) (US)
- Climax Blues Band
- Club Cheval
- Club Nouveau
- Cody Johnson (Warner Music Nashville)
- Cole Swindell (Warner Music Nashville)
- Colosseum (US/Canada)
- Con Hunley (Warner Bros. Nashville)
- Confide (Science/Warner Bros.)
- Connie Stevens
- Control Freq (F-111/Warner Bros.)
- Conway Twitty (Warner Bros. Nashville)
- Cool for August
- Cornershop (Luaka Bop/Warner Bros.)
- Cowboy Troy (Raybaw/Warner Bros. Nashville)
- Crash Adams
- Crawford/West (Warner Bros. Nashville)
- Cristina D'Avena (Warner Music Italy)
- Crystal Gayle (Warner Bros. Nashville)
- Curtis Mayfield (Curtom/Warner Bros.)
- Curved Air
- Cut Snake

== D ==
- D:Ream (Sire/Giant/Warner Bros.)
- D-A-D
- Da Bush Babees
- Dale (Paisley Park/Warner Bros.)
- Damien Rice
- Damn Yankees
- Damon Albarn (US)
- Dan + Shay (Warner Music Nashville)
- Dan Seals (Warner Bros. Nashville)
- Dana Dane (Maverick/Warner Bros.)
- Daniel Lanois
- Danielle Dax (Sire/Warner Bros.)
- Daniel Powter
- Danny O'Keefe
- Dark New Day
- Darrell Clanton
- Dasha (Warner Music Nashville)
- Dave Grusin
- David Ball (Warner Bros. Nashville)
- David Frizzell (Viva/Warner Bros. Nashville)
- David Guetta (Parlophone) (US)
- David Lee Roth
- Da Tortur3 Family (Da Family/Warner Records)
- David Rudder (Sire/Warner Bros.)
- David Ruffin
- David Sanborn
- David Van Tieghem
- Dawn Sears
- Daye Jack
- DC Superhero Girls
- De La Soul (Tommy Boy/Warner Bros.)
- Dead By Sunrise (Machine Shop/Warner)
- Dead Sara
- Dean Martin
- Death from Above 1979 (US only)
- Debby Boone (Curb/Warner Bros.)
- Debi Nova
- Deep Purple (North America/Japan)
- Deftones (Maverick/Reprise/Warner)
- Delta Rae (Sire/Warner)
- Dennis Miller
- Dennis Robbins (Giant/Warner Bros. Nashville)
- Depeche Mode (Sire/Warner Bros.; North and Central America)
- Devin Dawson (Warner Music Nashville)
- Devo (outside Europe)
- Diamond
- Dick and Dee Dee
- Digital Nas
- Digital Underground (Tommy Boy/Warner Bros.)
- Dio (US/Canada)
- Dion
- Dionne Warwick
- Dire Straits (US)
- Disciples
- Disturbed (Giant/Reprise/Warner)
- DJ Gwalla (Buu Music/Warner)
- Djivan Gasparyan (Opal/Warner Bros.)
- Don Henley
- Don Rickles
- Donald Fagen
- Donna Loren
- Donna Summer (non-USA)
- Doobie Brothers
- Dorothy Provine
- Dory Previn
- Doug Kershaw (Warner Bros. Nashville)
- DreamDoll
- Dr. John
- Dry Cell (band)
- Dua Lipa (outside Germany/Austria/Switzerland)
- Duncan Dhu (Sire/Warner Bros.)
- Duran Duran
- Dusty Drake (Warner Bros. Nashville)
- Dutchavelli (Parlophone)
- Dwight Yoakam (Warner Music Nashville)
- Dylan Gardner

== E ==
- E-40
- Earl Klugh
- Earl Sweatshirt
- Earshot
- Earth, Wind & Fire
- Ed Sheeran (Atlantic Records)
- Edd Byrnes
- Eddie Hazel
- Eddie Rabbitt (Warner Bros. Nashville)
- Eikichi Yazawa
- Eisley
- El DeBarge
- Electric Light Orchestra (Outside North America)
- Electronic
- Eliza Carthy
- Elizabeth Cook (Warner Bros. Nashville)
- Ella Henderson
- Elvis Costello
- Emily Armstrong
- Emmylou Harris (Warner Bros. Nashville)
- Enya (Warner Music UK)
- Erasure (Maverick/Warner Bros.) (US)
- Eric Andersen
- Eric Benét
- Eric Clapton (Duck/Warner Bros.)
- Euge Groove
- Deodato
- Evan Taubenfeld (Sire/Warner Bros.)
- Everlast
- Everything but the Girl (Sire/Warner Bros.) (US)
- Exile (Curb/Warner Bros)
- Eye to Eye

== F ==
- Faces
- Failure (Slash/Warner Bros.)
- Faith Hill (Warner Bros. Nashville)
- Falco (Sire/Warner Bros.)
- Father Guido Sarducci
- Faze Action (F-111/Warner Bros.)
- Feder
- Fifty Fifty (Warner Music Korea)
- Figures on a Beach (Sire/Warner Bros.)
- Five (Festival Mushroom/Warner Bros.)
- Flame (Giant/Warner Bros.)
- Flashlight Brown (Union 2112/Warner Music Canada)
- Fleet Foxes (Nonesuch/Warner)
- Fleetwood Mac
- Flim & the BB's
- Foals
- Force MD's (Tommy Boy/Warner Bros.)
- Fort Minor (Machine Shop/Warner)
- Flossy World Order (MoveTact/Warner Records)
- Fourplay
- Frankie Ballard (Warner Bros. Nashville)
- Frankie Beverly
- Freddie Gibbs
- Funkadelic

== G ==
- Gabby Barrett (Warner Music Nashville)
- Gail Davies (Warner Bros. Nashville)
- Gang of Four (North America)
- Gang of Youths (outside Australia and New Zealand)
- Gary Clark Jr.
- Gary Morris (Warner Bros. Nashville)
- Gary Wright
- Gene Watson (Warner Bros. Nashville)
- George Benson
- George Clinton (Paisley Park/Warner Bros.)
- George Duke
- George Harrison (Dark Horse/Warner Bros.)
- Georgia Middleman (Giant/Warner Bros.)
- Gerard Way (Reprise/Warner)
- Gilda Radner
- Gina G (Eternal/Warner Bros.)
- Giovannie and the Hired Guns (Warner Music Nashville)
- Glassjaw
- Glenn Yarbrough
- Glorified Magnified (Sire/Warner Bros.)
- Gods Child (Qwest/Warner Bros.)
- Golden Features
- Goo Goo Dolls (Metal Blade/Warner)
- Goldfinger (Maverick)
- Good Question (Paisley Park/Warner Bros.)
- GTA
- Gordon Lightfoot
- Gorillaz (Parlophone/Warner)
- Graham Bond
- Graham Central Station
- Grateful Dead
- Green Day (Reprise Records/Warner Bros.)
- Green Velvet (F-111/Warner Bros.)
- Greg Holden
- Greg Holland (Warner Bros. Nashville)
- Griff
- Gus Dapperton
- Gwen Guthrie

== H ==
- Hank Thompson (Warner Bros. Nashville)
- Hank Williams Jr. (Curb/Warner Bros. Nashville)
- Hard Meat
- Harold Budd (Opal/Warner Bros.)
- Harper's Bizarre
- Herbie Hancock
- Highway 101 (Warner Bros. Nashville)
- Hilly Michaels
- Hiroshima (Qwest/Warner Bros.)
- Hobo Johnson
- Hollow Hunnadz (HGWGM/Buu Music/Warner)
- Holly Dunn (Warner Bros. Nashville)
- Holy Moses
- Honeymoon Suite (US)
- Houndmouth
- House of Pain (Tommy Boy/Warner Bros.)
- Howie Mandel
- Hugh Laurie
- Hugo Largo (Opal/Warner Bros.)
- Tab Hunter
- Hüsker Dü

== I ==
- Ice-T (Sire/Warner Bros.)
- Idina Menzel
- IDK
- Ike & Tina Turner (Loma/Warner Bros.)
- iLoveMakonnen
- Information Society (Tommy Boy/Warner Bros.)
- Ingrid Chavez (Paisley Park/Warner Bros.)
- Iris DeMent
- Isaiah Rashad (Top Dawg/Warner)
- IShowSpeed
- IU (Warner Music Taiwan)

== J ==
- J Balvin
- Jack Palance
- Jack Webb
- Jackie Lomax
- Jade (Giant/Warner Bros.)
- Jaheim
- Jake Miller
- James Carter
- James Darren
- The House Band
- James Ingram (Qwest/Warner Bros.)
- James Otto (Warner Bros. Nashville)
- James Taylor
- James Wesley Prosser (Warner Bros. Nashville)
- Jane Child
- Jane's Addiction
- Janice Robinson
- Jasmine Guy
- Jeff Lorber
- Jennifer Trynin (Squint/Warner Bros.)
- Jenny Lewis
- Jeremy Jordan (Giant/Warner Bros.)
- Jerry Fielding
- Jerry Lee Lewis (Sire/Warner Bros.)
- Napoleon XIV
- Jesse Colin Young
- Jessica Harp (Warner Bros. Nashville)
- Jetski
- Jill Jones (Paisley Park/Warner Bros.)
- Jim Carroll (Giant/Warner Bros.)
- Jimi Hendrix (Reprise/Warner Bros.)
- Jimmy Durante
- Jisoo (Blissoo/Warner)
- Joanie Sommers
- Joanna Cotten (Warner Bros. Nashville)
- Jocelyn Brown
- Joe "Fingers" Carr
- Joe Nichols (Giant/Warner Bros. Nashville)
- Joe Sample
- Joe Walsh
- John Anderson (Warner Bros. Nashville)
- John Cale
- John Fogerty
- John Hartford
- John Mellencamp
- John Michael Montgomery (Warner Bros. Nashville)
- John Raitt and the Kids
- John Scott Trotter
- John Simon
- Johnny Lee (Warner Bros. Nashville)
- Johnny Sea
- JoJo
- Jon Hassell
- Joni Harms (Warner Bros. Nashville)
- Jordan Witzigreuter
- Josh Groban (Reprise/Warner)
- Joshua Bassett
- Joshua Redman
- Josiah Leming
- JR JR
- Julee Cruise
- Julia Sweeney
- Julie Brown (Sire/Warner Bros.)
- Juluka
- Jungle Brothers
- Junior Walker
- Justine Skye

== K ==
- K7 (Tommy Boy/Warner Bros.)
- k.d. lang (Sire/Warner Bros.)
- Kai Linting
- Kanii (Masked/Warner)
- Karen Brooks (Warner Bros. Nashville)
- Karyn White
- Kaskade
- Kate and Anna McGarrigle
- Kate Earl (Record Collection/Warner Bros.)
- Kath & Kim (FMR/Warner Bros.)
- Kathie Lee Gifford
- Kaya Stewart
- Keith Washington (Qwest/Warner Bros.)
- Ken Laszlo
- Kenny Chesney (Warner Music Nashville)
- Kenny Garrett
- Kenny Young
- Kenya Grace
- The Reese Project (Giant/Warner Bros.)
- Kid Capri (Cold Chillin'/Warner Bros.)
- Kid Creole and the Coconuts (Sire/Warner Bros.)
- Kidneythieves (Extasy International/Warner Bros.)
- Kim Carnes
- Kimbra
- Kelani Jordan (Cage Riot/Warner Records)
- King Crimson (EG/Warner Bros.) (US & Canada)
- Kirk Whalum
- Klangstof
- Kenzo B (Defiant/Warner Records)
- Ondar
- Kool G Rap & DJ Polo (Cold Chillin'/Warner Bros.)
- Kraftwerk (US & Canada)

== L ==
- Ladysmith Black Mambazo
- Laid Back (Sire/Warner Bros.)
- Lalaine
- Lamont Dozier
- Lane Turner (Warner Bros. Nashville)
- Larry Graham
- Laila!
- Laura Dawn (Extasy International/Warner Bros.)
- Laura Marano
- Laura Pausini
- Lauren Lucas (Warner Bros. Nashville)
- Laurie Anderson
- Laurindo Almeida
- Lawrence Reynolds
- Leigh-Anne
- Lena Horne (Qwest/Warner Bros.)
- Leo Sayer (US/Canada)
- Leon Redbone
- Les Négresses Vertes (Sire/Warner Bros.)
- Leschea
- Leslie Satcher
- Less Than Jake (Sire/Warner Bros.)
- Liam Gallagher
- Lianne La Havas (Nonesuch/Warner)
- Liberace
- Lil Pump
- Lila McCann (Warner Bros. Nashville)
- Lily Allen (Regal/Parlophone/Warner) (US)
- Lindemann
- Lindsay Pagano
- Linkin Park (Machine Shop)
- Little Feat
- Little Richard
- Little Texas (Warner Bros. Nashville)
- Loona (Atlantic Records)
- Loreena McKennitt
- Lori McKenna (Warner Bros. Nashville)
- Lorraine Ellison (Loma/Warner Bros.)
- Los Lobos (Slash/Warner Bros.)
- Lou Reed (Sire/Warner Bros.)
- Loso Brim (Sleep Is For The Rich Ent./Warner)
- Love De-Luxe
- Lovejoy
- Laura Pergolizzi (LP)
- Lukas Graham (outside Scandinavia and France)
- Lyle Mays
- Lynsey de Paul (UK/Europe)

== M ==
- M (Sire/Warner Bros.) (US/Canada)
- M.C. Shan (Cold Chillin'/Warner Bros.)
- M2M (US)
- Mac McAnally (Warner Bros. Nashville)
- Mac Miller (Reprise)
- Maddox Batson (Prosper Entertainment/Warner Records)
- Madhouse (Paisley Park/Warner Bros.)
- Madleen Kane
- Madonna (Warner Bros./Maverick/Sire)
- Magic Dirt
- Magnus (Facultad de Némea/Warner Bros.)
- Majid Jordan (OVO Sound/Warner)
- Major Figgas (Ruffnation/Warner Bros.)
- Malo
- Manfred Mann's Earth Band (US & Canada)
- Manu Dibango (Giant/Warner Bros.)
- Margo Smith (Warner Bros. Nashville)
- Maria Muldaur
- Marion Raven
- Marit Larsen
- Miyaa V (Third Street/Warner Records)
- Mark Knopfler (US)
- Mark O'Connor (Warner Bros. Nashville)
- Mark Turner
- Martini Ranch (Sire/Warner Bros.)
- Marty Paich
- Madeline the Person
- Marty Robbins (Warner Bros. Nashville)
- Mary Travers
- Mason Williams
- Mastodon (Reprise/Warner)
- Maude Latour
- Maura O'Connell
- Maureen McGovern
- Mavis Staples (Paisley Park/Warner Bros.)
- Mayra Veronica
- Mazarati (Paisley Park/Warner Bros.)
- Maze
- Meg & Dia (Doghouse/Warner Bros.)
- Megan Thee Stallion
- Meghan Patrick (Warner Music Canada)
- Mêlée
- Melissa Lawson (Warner Bros. Nashville)
- Mephisto Odyssey
- Mest (Maverick/Warner Bros.)
- Metallica (US & Canada)
- Michael Bublé (143/Warner)
- Michael Franks
- Michael Martin Murphey (Warner Bros. Nashville)
- Michael McDonald
- Michael Sembello
- Michael White
- MIKA (Warner Bros./Mushroom/Festival)
- Mike de Albuquerque
- Mike Shinoda (Machine Shop)
- Miles Davis
- Milt Jackson (Qwest/Warner Bros.)
- Ministry
- Miriam Makeba
- Missing Persons
- Modern English (Sire/Warner Bros.)
- Modern Jazz Quartet
- Moloko (Echo/Warner Bros.)
- Monica Mancini (PBS/Warner Bros.)
- Monie Love
- Montrose
- Morris Day (Paisley Park/Warner Bros.)
- Morten Harket
- Mr. Bungle (North America)
- Muse (Helium 3/Warner)
- My Bloody Valentine (Sire/Warner Bros.)
- My Chemical Romance (Reprise)
- Mystery Skulls

== N ==
- Naughty by Nature (Tommy Boy/Warner Bros.)
- Nazareth (US/Canada)
- Neal McCoy (Warner Bros. Nashville)
- Neil Young (Reprise/Warner)
- Neon Hitch
- Nessa Barrett
- Never Shout Never (Loveway/Warner)
- New Order (Qwest/Warner Bros.) (US)
- New Politics (DCD2/Warner)
- Nico & Vinz
- Nicolette Larson
- Nightmare of You (Sire/Warner Bros.)
- Nile Rodgers
- Nines
- Nitty Gritty Dirt Band (Warner Bros. Nashville)
- NLE Choppa

== O ==
- Ofra Haza (Sire/Warner Bros.)
- Oingo Boingo (Giant/Warner Bros.)
- Olive (Maverick/Warner Bros.)
- Oliver Heldens
- Omah Lay (KeyQaad/Sir/Warner))
- Omar Apollo
- One 2 One
- One Ok Rock (Fueled By Ramen/Atlantic/Warner)
- Orrall & Wright (Giant/Warner Bros. Nashville)

== P ==
- Pam Tillis (Warner Bros. Nashville)
- Paramore (Fueled by Ramen/Atlantic)
- Paris Hilton
- Jamie
- Partybaby
- PartyNextDoor
- Pat Metheny
- Patti Austin (Qwest/Warner Bros.)
- Paul Jabara
- Paul Parker (Sire/Warner Bros.)
- Paul Simon
- Paul Stookey
- Paul Weller
- Paula Cole (Imago/Warner Bros.)
- Pecos and the Rooftops
- Pendulum
- Perry Farrell
- Peter Cetera (Full Moon/Warner Bros.)
- Peter Ivers
- Peter Yarrow
- Peter, Paul & Mary
- Petula Clark (US)
- Phajja
- Phases
- Pinkard & Bowden (Warner Bros. Nashville)
- PinkPantheress
- Porno for Pyros
- PrettyMuch (Sire Records)
- Primal Scream (Sire/Warner Bros.)
- Prince (Paisley Park/NPG/Warner Bros.)
- Priory
- Public Image Limited (US)
- Pvris (Reprise/Warner)

== Q ==
- Qbomb (Ghost Pixel/10K/Warner)
- Quacky Duck and His Barnyard Friends
- Quad City DJ's
- Queen Latifah (Tommy Boy/Warner Bros.)
- Quincy Jones (Qwest/Warner Bros.)

== R ==
- R.E.M.
- Rabbitt (Capricorn/Warner Bros.) (US/Canada)
- Radioactive Cats
- Rahsaan Roland Kirk
- Ramones (Sire/Warner Bros.)
- Randy Crawford
- Randy Newman
- Randy Travis (Warner Bros. Nashville)
- Ray Charles (Qwest/Warner Bros.)
- Ray Heindorf
- Ray Scott (Warner Bros. Nashville)
- Ray Stevens (Warner Bros. Nashville)
- RBX (Premeditated/Warner Bros.)
- Real Like You
- Red Box (Sire/Warner Bros.)
- Red Hot Chili Peppers
- RedOne
- Regina Spektor (Sire/Warner)
- Remble
- Remy Bond
- Renaissance (Warner Bros. UK)
- Residual Kid
- Rhino Bucket
- Ric Ocasek (Maverick/Warner Bros.)
- Ricky Montgomery
- Richard Hawley
- Richard "Groove" Holmes
- Richard Pryor
- Rick Springfield
- Rick Trevino (Warner Bros. Nashville)
- Rickie Lee Jones
- Rilo Kiley
- Robben Ford
- Robert Mirabal
- Robert Schimmel
- Robyn Ottolini (Warner Nashville)
- Rockers Hi-Fi
- Rod McKuen
- Rod Stewart
- Rodney Crowell (Warner Bros. Nashville)
- Roger Troutman
- Roger Voudouris
- Rollerskate Skinny
- Ronnie Wood
- Rose Royce
- Rosebud
- Roxy Music (E.G./Warner Bros.) (US/Canada)
- Roy Woods (OVO Sound/Warner)
- Royal Blood
- RPM
- Rufus
- Ry Cooder

== S ==
- S'Express (Rhythm King/Sire/Warner Bros.)
- Saafir (Qwest/Warner Bros.)
- Sacha Distel
- Saga
- SahBabii
- Saint Etienne
- SAINt JHN
- Sam Kinison
- Sandra St. Victor
- Sanford-Townsend Band
- Saukrates
- Savoy
- Saweetie
- Scritti Politti (North America)
- Seal
- Seal (ZTT/Sire/Warner Bros.)
- Seals and Crofts
- Seatrain
- Sex Pistols (North America)
- Sha EK
- Shadowfax
- Shannon Brown (Warner Bros. Nashville)
- Shaun Cassidy
- Shawn Lane
- Sheila E.
- Shelly West (Viva/Warner Bros. Nashville)
- Sherbert (Festival Mushroom/Warner Bros.)
- Sherrick
- Shriekback
- The Simpsons (Rhino/Warner Bros.)
- Sir Mix-a-Lot (American/Warner Bros.)
- Sisters of Glory
- Sixwire (Warner Bros. Nashville)
- Skrew (Metal Blade/Warner Bros.)
- Skyhooks (Mushroom/Warner Bros.)
- Slade
- Sleeping With Sirens
- Sofia Shinas
- Soft Cell (Sire/Warner Bros.) (US/Canada)
- Sonny & Cher
- Son Volt
- Sophia George (Sire/Warner Bros.)
- Soul Coughing (Slash/Warner Bros.)
- Southern Pacific (Warner Bros. Nashville)
- Spencer Ludwig
- Spike Jones
- Spirea X
- Static-X
- Tin Tin (Sire/Warner Bros.)
- Stereophonics
- Stetsasonic (Tommy Boy/Warner Bros.)
- Steve Earle (Warner Bros. Nashville)
- Steve Forbert
- Steve Martin
- Steve Stevens
- Steve Winwood (Island/Warner Bros.)
- Steven Van Zandt (Rhino/Warner Bros.)
- Steven Wright
- Stevie Nicks
- Stoneground
- Stormzy
- Stuckey Mane (Buu Music/Warner)
- Stuff
- Sue Saad and the Next
- Sub Urban
- Sven Väth
- Swallow
- Sway & King Tech (Giant/Warner Bros.)
- Sylvester

== T ==
- T. Rex (US)
- T.G. Sheppard (Curb/Warner Bros. Nashville)
- Tab Hunter
- Taking Back Sunday
- Talking Heads (Sire/Warner Bros.)
- Tamia (Qwest/Warner Bros.)
- Tara Kemp (Giant/Warner Bros.)
- Tarantula
- TBTBT (Cold Chillin'/Warner Bros.)
- Teairra Marí
- Teen Dream
- Tortur3 T (Cage Riot/Warner Records)
- Teddy Swims
- Tegan and Sara (Sire/Warner)
- Telex (Slash/Warner Bros.)
- Terri Gibbs (Warner Bros. Nashville)
- Tevin Campbell (Qwest/Warner Bros.)
- The Arcs
- The Association
- The Avalanches
- The B-52's (Americas/Australia)
- The Band
- The Beau Brummels
- The Bellamy Brothers (Curb/Warner Bros. Nashville)
- The Black Keys (Nonesuch/Warner)
- The Church (US/Canada)
- The Collectors
- The Cribs
- The Cure (Sire/Warner Bros.) (US/Canada/New Zealand)
- The D.O.C. (Giant/Warner Bros.)
- The Dead Weather
- The Derailers (Sire/Warner Bros.)
- The Dream Academy (Reprise/Warner Bros.)
- The Dukes
- The Everly Brothers
- The Family (Paisley Park/Warner Bros.)
- The Flaming Lips
- The Forester Sisters (Warner Bros. Nashville)
- The Four Seasons
- The Head and the Heart
- The Hues Corporation
- The Ides of March
- The Isley Brothers
- The JaneDear Girls (Warner Bros. Nashville)
- The Jesus and Mary Chain
- The Judybats (Sire/Warner Bros.)
- The Living Tombstone (Ghost Pixel/10K/Warner)
- The Magician
- The Maine
- The Marketts
- The Mavis's (Festival Mushroom Records/Warner Bros.)
- The McCarters (Warner Bros. Nashville)
- The Mighty Lemon Drops (Sire/Warner Bros.)
- The Neon Philharmonic
- The Network
- The Notting Hillbillies
- The Premiers
- The Pretenders (Real/Sire/Warner Bros.) (US)
- The Pretty Things
- The Prodigy (Cooking Vinyl/Maverick/Warner Bros.) (US)
- The Regrettes
- The Roches
- The Routers
- The Rutles
- The Shelters
- Ramona King
- The Sky Kings (Warner Bros. Nashville)
- The Smiths (Sire/Warner Bros.) (US/Canada)
- The Three O'Clock (Paisley Park/Warner Bros.)
- The Time
- The Tokens
- The Velvet Underground (Sire/Warner Bros.)
- The Walters
- The White Stripes (Icky Thump)
- The Whites (Warner Bros. Nashville)
- The Who (US/Canada)
- The Wild Feathers
- The Wilkinsons (Giant/Warner Bros. Nashville)
- The Wreckers (Maverick/Warner Bros. Nashville)
- The Youngbloods
- Theophilus London
- THEY. (Mind Of a Genius/Warner)
- Thin Lizzy (Vertigo/Warner Bros.)
- Thomas Dolby (Giant/Warner Bros.) (US)
- Thompson Twins
- Throwing Muses (Sire/Warner Bros.)
- Tim Buckley
- Tim Maia (Warner/Atlantic/Elektra/WEA International/Warner-Continental)
- Tim Mensy (Giant/Warner Bros.)
- Tim Ryan (Warner Bros. Nashville)
- TKA (Tommy Boy/Warner Bros.)
- Todd Rundgren (Bearsville/Warner Bros.)
- Tom Petty and the Heartbreakers (Reprise/Warner)
- Tom Petty
- Tom Tom Club (Sire/Warner Bros.)
- Tommy Page (Sire/Warner Bros.)
- Tony Joe White
- Tower of Power
- Trapt
- Traveling Wilburys (Wilbury/Warner Bros.)
- Travis Tritt (Warner Bros. Nashville)
- Tribe (Slash/Warner Bros.)
- Trick Pony (Warner Bros. Nashville)
- Turley Richards
- Twenty One Pilots (Fueled by Ramen/Warner)
- Twin Shadow
- Tyler Braden (Warner Bros. Nashville)
- Tynisha Keli

== U ==
- Ultra Naté
- Ultramarine (Sire/Giant Warner Bros.)
- Unheart (Facultad de Némea/Warner Bros.)
- Uriah Heep

== V ==
- V Factory
- Van Dyke Parks
- Van Halen
- Van Morrison
- Vanity 6
- Veeze
- Vicki Sue Robinson (Rhino/Warner Bros.)
- Vince Guaraldi
- Vince Neil
- Vlad (Facultad de Némea/Warner Bros.)

== W ==
- Waka Flocka Flame
- Wale
- Wallace Roney
- Wavves
- Emily Weisband
- We've Got a Fuzzbox and We're Gonna Use It
- Whitesnake (Geffen/Warner Bros.)
- William Beckmann (Warner Music Nashville)
- William Orbit (Maverick/Warner Bros.)
- Wiz Khalifa
- Wizzard (Warner Bros. (Outside North America))
- Womack & Womack
- Wright Brothers Band (Warner Bros. Nashville)

== Y ==
- Yellowjackets
- YFN Lucci
- Yolanda Be Cool
- Baby Tate
- Yeule

== Z ==
- Zach Bryan (Warner Music Nashville)
- Zapp
- ZZ Top
- Zzz. (Grade A/Warner)

== See also ==
- Warner Records
- List of Reprise Records artists
- Reprise Records
