= I Don't Wanna Wait =

I Don't Wanna Wait may refer to:

- "I Don't Wanna Wait" (Hanaumi song), a 1996 song
- "I Don't Wanna Wait" (David Guetta and OneRepublic song), a 2024 song
- "I Don't Wanna Wait", a song by SOJA from the 2009 album Born in Babylon
- "I Don't Wanna Wait", a 2016 single by Partybaby
- "Don't Wanna Wait", a song by Sugababes from the 2000 album One Touch
- "Don't Wanna Wait", a song by Count Basic from the 2000 album Trust Your Instincts
- "Permanently Scarred (I Don't Wanna Wait)", a song by Tragedy Khadafi from the 2001 album Against All Odds

== See also ==
- "I Don't Want to Wait", a 1997 single by Paula Cole
