= Bloodsimple =

American heavy metal band

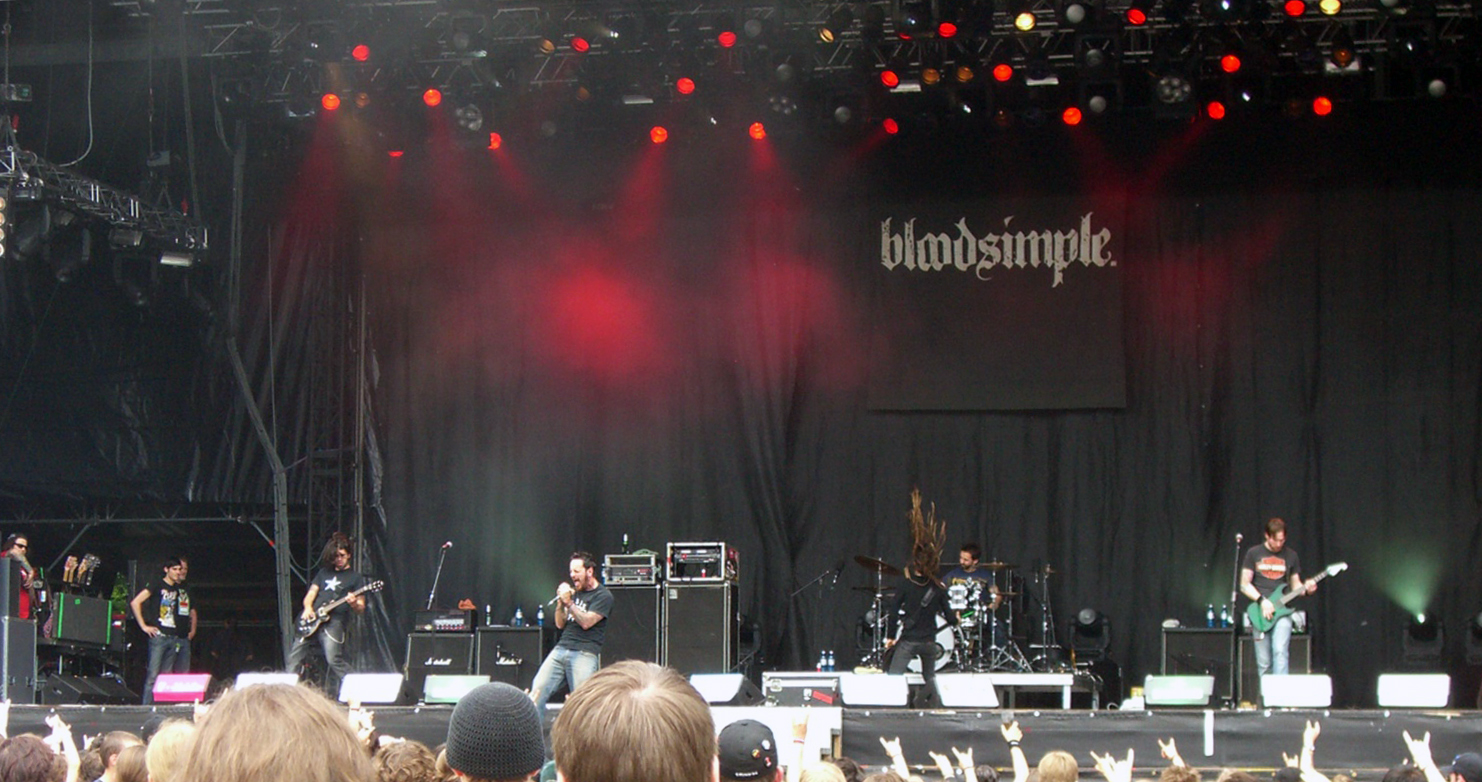
- Bloodsimple at Rock im Park 2007

Background information
- Origin: New York City, United States
- Genres: Metalcore; alternative metal; groove metal; nu metal
- Years active: 2002–2008
- Labels: Bullygoat, Reprise, Warner Bros.
- Spinoff of: Vision of Disorder
- Past members: Tim Williams; Mike Kennedy; Nick Rowe; Kyle Sanders; Chris Hamilton

Bloodsimple was an American heavy metal band from New York City that formed in 2002. They were signed to Warner Bros. Records.

The band's name comes from a term coined by detective novelist Dashiell Hammett. The term apparently describes the addled, fearful mindset people are in after a prolonged immersion in violent situations. The term was coined in the novel Red Harvest, which is also the title of Bloodsimple's second album.

== History ==
=== Early history (2002–2004) ===
Bloodsimple formed in 2002, originally under the name Fix 8, and featured former Vision of Disorder members vocalist Tim Williams and guitarist Mike Kennedy, along with ex-Piece Dogs, Skrew, and Medication and current Hellyeah bassist Kyle Sanders (brother of Troy Sanders, bassist of heavy metal band Mastodon), and former Downset, and Deadbolt drummer Chris Hamilton.

In early May 2004, the band opened New York shows for Superjoint Ritual. Later that month, the band signed to Warner Bros. Records, through Bullygoat Records, an imprint founded by Chad Gray, vocalist for Mudvayne, and later, Hellyeah. Their debut album, entitled A Cruel World, was recorded in Vancouver, Canada with producer Garth Richardson. Then, in late February 2005, they began the "Alliance of Defiance" U.S. tour alongside Otep, American Head Charge and Candiria.

=== A Cruel World (2005–2007) ===
In May, the band was featured on the soundtrack to the film House of Wax, with their song "Path to Prevail." In its first week of release, A Cruel World sold 3,120 copies, according to Nielsen SoundScan. In April, Bloodsimple were rumored to be the band given the second "mystery band" slot on the second stage at Ozzfest. However, that report was later refuted by a spokesperson for Ozzfest.

In June 2005, Bloodsimple began touring the U.S. with American Head Charge and Static-X. Also in June, drummer Brendon Cohen joined bassist Mike Fleischmann, vocalist B. Folly and guitarist Skullion to form a new band named Karnov. Bloodsimple then teamed up with Byzantine, Gizmachi and headliners Six Feet Under for the "Masters of Brutality" U.S. tour that was to begin in July. However, the tour was postponed. On July 26, the music video for "What If I Lost It," off the band's debut album, was posted on MySpace. On August 27, it was announced that the band, along with Disturbed, Dope, and Life of Agony, among others were scheduled to appear at Locobazooka! in September. On August 31, it was announced that the band's song "Overload" would appear on the Masters of Horror soundtrack.

On September 11, the track listing for Roadrunner Records' Roadrunner United compilation album was revealed, and it showed that Bloodsimple vocalist Tim Williams would be performing on the track "Army of the Sun." Then five days later, it was announced that the band's song "September" would be featured on the Saw II soundtrack. On September 24, 2005, the band's concert at Club Voltage in Levittown, New York included an unannounced reunion performance by Vision Of Disorder vocalist Tim Williams and guitarist Mike Kennedy. Throughout October and November the band performed with Throwdown, Soulfly and Incite. On December 5, it was announced that the band's song "Sell Me Out" would be appearing on the Best of The Taste of Chaos compilation two-CD set. On December 19, Roadrunner Records posted a list of some of their artists' selections for the top 10 albums of the year, and both Brock Lindow of 36 Crazyfists and Chris Spicuzza of Chimaira selected Bloodsimple's A Cruel World as the seventh best album of 2005.

Bloodsimple began 2006, by performing in support of Disturbed on the Jägermeister Music Tour. In March, the band was scheduled for "The Crusade III: Ascend Above the Ashes" tour in the U.K. and Ireland along with God Forbid and Trivium. In May, drummer Chris Hamilton left Bloodsimple, forming a new band named Saint Caine along with former Dropbox members vocalist / guitarist John Kosco and guitarist Joey Wilkinson and bassist John Eville. Drummer Brendon Cohen toured as a replacement for the summer of 2006, resulting in three fifth's (60%) of Vision Of Disorder's old lineup playing a limited number of shows.

Throughout the summer, Bloodsimple performed with Stone Sour and the recently reformed Alice in Chains in Europe, a tour which included an appearance at the Metallica and Korn headlined Download Festival in Castle Donington on June 10. The band also performed at the Nova Rock 2006 in Burgenland, Austria. From June 30 through July 2, the band performed at the German With Full Force festival at Flugplatz Roitzschjora in Löbnitz, Germany.

Bloodsimple performed at the Rock am Ring and Rock im Park festivals in Nürburgring and Nürnberg, Germany, respectively, as well as the Gods of Metal Festival in Italy on June 4. They then performed at the Hultsfred Festival in Hultsfred, Sweden. On July 1, Bloodsimple performed, along with bands such as Alice in Chains, DragonForce, and Motörhead, at the 2006 Waldrock Festival in Burgum, The Netherlands.

Bloodsimple performed at the Loud Park 06 festival on October 14 and 15 at the Makuhari Messe International Exhibition Halls in Tokyo, Japan. In December, the band posted a cover of The Doors' "Five to One" on their MySpace page.

=== Red Harvest (2007–2008) ===
Bloodsimple were reported to begin a tour with Diecast and Sevendust on February 8, 2007 in Fort Wayne, Indiana. However, on December 20, that report was refuted by Bloodsimple saying; "We're putting the finishing touches on the record this week and will mix it first thing in January 2007, then wait on official release date and touring plans which will hopefully be in March."

On April 21, it was announced that Bloodsimple, along with Medication, would be an opening act for Hellyeah in May. On May 28, it was announced that the band's next album was originally scheduled to be released in July. However, the album's release was postponed.

Bloodsimple then spent the latter part of May and most of June touring in Europe, performing at festivals and clubs. Some of the performances that month include; performing on the "Dimebag Darrell Stage" at the Download Festival in Donington Park, Leicestershire., performing at the Fields of Rock festival in Biddinghuizen, the Netherlands on June 16, performing at the Bilbao DDK Live Festival 2007, in Bilbao, Euskal Herria, Spain on June 21, performing at the Hellfest in Clisson, France on June 22, and performing between June 23–24 in Dessel, Belgium at the Metal Dome as part of the Graspop Metal Metting. Then on July 29, Bloodsimple was added to the Family Values Tour, and would be performing on the second-stage. However, on September 1, the band issued a statement announcing that they were forced to cancel their appearances on the final three days of the Family Values tour, due to vocalist Tim Williams having a tooth pulled.

On October 30, the same day as their new album's release, the band began touring in support of Hellyeah on the "Balls Volume Strength" tour. That same day, the band's long delayed second album, Red Harvest was released in the U.S. through Bullygoat/Reprise Records. It was produced by Machine, who had produced records for many successful acts such as Eighteen Visions and Lamb of God. In its first week of release, the album sold 2,400 copies. On November 20, Bloodsimple was scheduled to perform in Amarillo, Texas along with Hellyeah and Otep, however, on the day of the concert, it was announced that that night's concert had been cancelled.

Bloodsimple then opened for Avenged Sevenfold from January 17 through February 1. Then, that same month, the music video for the band's next single "Out to Get You" began streaming on the official website for Metal Hammer. The video features footage from the movie Night of the Living Dead by George A. Romero. In April, the band joined Korn, Biohazard, and Chimaira on a six show tour of Australia and New Zealand. Then on April 9, it was announced that they had been nominated for an award at the 2008 Metal Hammer Golden Gods Awards. They were nominated, along with Still Remains, Apocalyptica, DevilDriver, and Every Time I Die, for "Breakthrough Artist." Bloodsimple were then scheduled to appear on WSOU's 60th Anniversary show on April 18, however, just six days prior to the show, it was announced that they had been replaced by Anaka. On April 16, it was announced that Bloodsimple was scheduled to perform at Rockfest, in Kansas City, Missouri. However, on May 30 bassist Kyle Sanders stated the band would not attend the festival.

In late 2008, their song "Dead Man Walking" was featured on the video game WWE Smackdown vs Raw 2009. In October 2008, Vision of Disorder reformed to record a new album.

In March 2010 bassist Kyle Sanders released a statement concerning his new band Monstro, the beginning of which indicates that Bloodsimple is no longer an active band.

== Members ==
Final lineup

- Tim Williams - vocals (2002–2008)
- Mike Kennedy - guitar (2002–2008)
- Nick Rowe - guitar (2002–2008)
- Kyle Sanders - bass (2002–2008)

Former members

- Chris Hamilton - drums (2002–2006)
- Chris Jeter - drums (2006-2008)

Live and studio musicians

- Brendon Cohen - drums (2006)
- Will Hunt - drums (2007)
- Mike Froedge - drums (2007)
- Bevan Davies - drums (2007–2008)

== Discography ==
=== Studio albums ===
Year	Album details	Peak chart
Year	Album details	US Heat.
2005	A Cruel World: Released: March 29, 2005; Label: Reprise; Format: CD	44
2007	Red Harvest: Released: October 30, 2007; Label: Reprise; Format: CD	10
"—" denotes a release that did not chart.

=== Demos and EPs ===
Demo 2002, released: 2002

1. "Fixated" (2:52)
2. "Plunder" (3:08)
3. "Running from Nothing" (3:54)
4. "What You're Looking for" (3:46)
5. "Burn You All" (3:15)

Demo 2003, released: Early 2003

1. "Path to Prevail" (3:24)
2. "Breaking the Mold" (4:01)
3. "Running from Nothing" (3:54)
4. "Flatlined" (4:09)
5. "Overload" (3:28)

Demo 2003, released: Mid/late 2003

1. "Breaking the Mold" (3:51)
2. "September" (3:44)
3. "Running from Nothing" (4:27)
4. "Flatlined" (4:03)

Demo 2004, released: August 10, 2004 on Warner Bros. Records

1. "Sell Me Out" (3:37)
2. "Running from Nothing" (3:50)
3. "Path to Prevail" (3:17)

Bloodsimple EP, released: February 15, 2005 on Relapse Records

1. "Straight Hate" (Faded Ending)
2. "Blood in Blood Out"
3. "What If I Lost It"
4. "Sell Me Out"

=== B-sides ===
- 2005: Masters of Horror OST – "Overload" (3:23)
- 2005: Saw II OST – "September" (3:38)
- 2006: Official Myspace page – "Five to One" (The Doors cover) (4:18)

=== Singles ===
Year	Song	US Main.	Album
2005	"Straight Hate"	—	A Cruel World
2005	"Sell Me Out"	39	A Cruel World
2006	"What If I Lost It"	38	A Cruel World
2007	"Out to Get You"	30	Red Harvest
2008	"Dark Helmet"	—	Red Harvest
"—" denotes a release that did not chart.

== See also ==
- List of current Warner Bros. Records artists
- List of current Reprise Records artists
