= Forplay =

Forplay may refer to:

- PlayN, an open source Java software framework and set of libraries intended to create multi-platform games
- ForPlay, a 2009 EP by Saint Motel

== See also ==
- Fourplay (disambiguation)
