= A Cruel World =

2005 studio album by Bloodsimple

Studio album by Bloodsimple
- Released: March 29, 2005
- Recorded: 2004
- Studios: Warehouse Studios Vancouver, British Columbia, Canada
- Genres: Nu metal; alternative metal; metalcore; groove metal
- Length: 44:49
- Labels: Bullygoat, Reprise
- Producers: GGGarth and Bloodsimple

Bloodsimple chronology
Demo 2004 (2004)	A Cruel World (2005)	Red Harvest (2007)

Singles from A Cruel World
- 1. "Straight Hate" Released: 2005; 2. "Sell Me Out" Released: 2005; 3. "What If I Lost You" Released: 2006

Professional ratings
Review scores
Source	Rating
AllMusic	2.5/5 stars

A Cruel World is the debut studio album by American heavy metal band Bloodsimple. The album was released on March 29, 2005.

== Musical style ==
A Cruel World has been labeled as a nu metal, alternative metal, metalcore, and groove metal album.

== Production and marketing ==
The band’s debut record was recorded with rock producer GGGarth Richardson in Vancouver, British Columbia, Canada. Richardson had previously worked with a number of alternative metal acts, including Rage Against the Machine, Slipknot, 40 Below Summer, Chevelle and Trapt. According to the band, Richardson understood the sound the band was seeking and did not attempt to "tone it down".

The record's production was a lengthy process, spanning approximately three years from beginning to end. After an extended period of writing, the band spent three and a half months in the studio. The basic elements of the album, including most of the vocals, were recorded in six weeks. After taking some time off, the band received an initial mix of the record, but were dissatisfied with the results. The record was remixed with more success by Mike Fraser.

== Songs ==
The themes of Cruel World include war ("Straight Hate"), failed relationships ("Leaving Song", "Sell Me Out"), paranoia ("Running from Nothing") and drug addiction ("Flatlined").

The album's first single, "Straight Hate", was written about American soldiers fighting in Iraq. Vocalist Tim Williams stated that the song was about how difficult it was for the soldiers and that he wanted to write something where the words would help them through the day. Williams denies that the song is political, stating that he does not care about the Government's reasons for deployment of troops to the Gulf.

The song "Flatlined" is about drug addiction, and was written from the perspective of a drug addict who eventually dies. Williams states that one of his best friends, who loved the song, ended up dying in the same way.

The track "Falling Backwards" features a guest performance by Mudvayne's Chad Gray.

"What if I Lost it" was used as the theme music for Fuse TV's Metal Asylum and added as a soundtrack in EA Sports' Arena Football video game.

== Track listing ==
1. "Straight Hate" – 4:46
2. "Path to Prevail" – 3:18
3. "What If I Lost It" – 3:25
4. "Blood in Blood Out" – 2:20
5. "Sell Me Out" – 3:38
6. "The Leaving Song" – 4:32
7. "Running from Nothing" – 4:12
8. "Cruel World" – 3:56
9. "Flatlined" – 4:14
10. "Falling Backwards" (feat. Chad Gray of Mudvayne) – 3:51
11. "Plunder" – 6:45
- This song ends at 3:23 followed by silence until 4:53, at which point a phone conversation fades in which leads to the end of the track.

== Personnel ==
- Tim Williams – Vocals
- Mike Kennedy – guitar
- Nick Rowe – guitar
- Kyle Sanders – bass guitar
- Chris Hamilton – drums

== Charting positions ==
Album

Year	Chart	Position
2005	Top Heatseekers	44

Singles

Year	Single	Chart	Position
2005	"Sell Me Out"	Mainstream Rock Tracks	39
2005	"What If I Lost It?"	Mainstream Rock Tracks	38
