= Red Harvest (Bloodsimple album) =

Studio album by Bloodsimple
- Released: October 30, 2007
- Genres: Groove metal, nu metal, alternative metal
- Length: 45:40
- Labels: Bullygoat, Reprise
- Producer: Machine

Bloodsimple chronology
A Cruel World (2005)	Red Harvest (2007)

Professional ratings
Review scores
Source	Rating
AllMusic	Positive
Blabbermouth.net	8/10
Drowned in Sound	0/10

Red Harvest is the second and final album by American metal band Bloodsimple, released on October 30, 2007. Will Hunt played drums on the album as a hired musician, not a full band member. Frontman Tim Williams explained how the title of the album is based on the 1929 book of the same name by Dashiell Hammett.

The song "Dead Man Walking" was included on the soundtrack of the video game WWE SmackDown vs. Raw 2009.

== Track listing ==
All tracks are written by Bloodsimple.

No.	Title	Length
1.	"Ride with Me"	4:57
2.	"Red Harvest"	3:47
3.	"Dark Helmet"	3:47
4.	"Dead Man Walking"	3:57
5.	"Out to Get You"	3:47
6.	"Suck It Up"	3:30
7.	"Death from Above"	4:02
8.	"Whiskey Bent and Hellbound (Hellmyr)"	6:05
9.	"Killing Time"	3:43
10.	"Truth (Thicker Than Water)"	5:24
11.	"Numina Infuscata"	2:41

== Personnel ==
- Tim Williams - vocals
- Mike Kennedy - guitar
- Nick Rowe - guitar
- Kyle Sanders - bass

=== Studio musician ===
- Will Hunt - drums

=== Touring musician ===
- Jacob Ward - drums
