= Fields of Rock =

Music festival

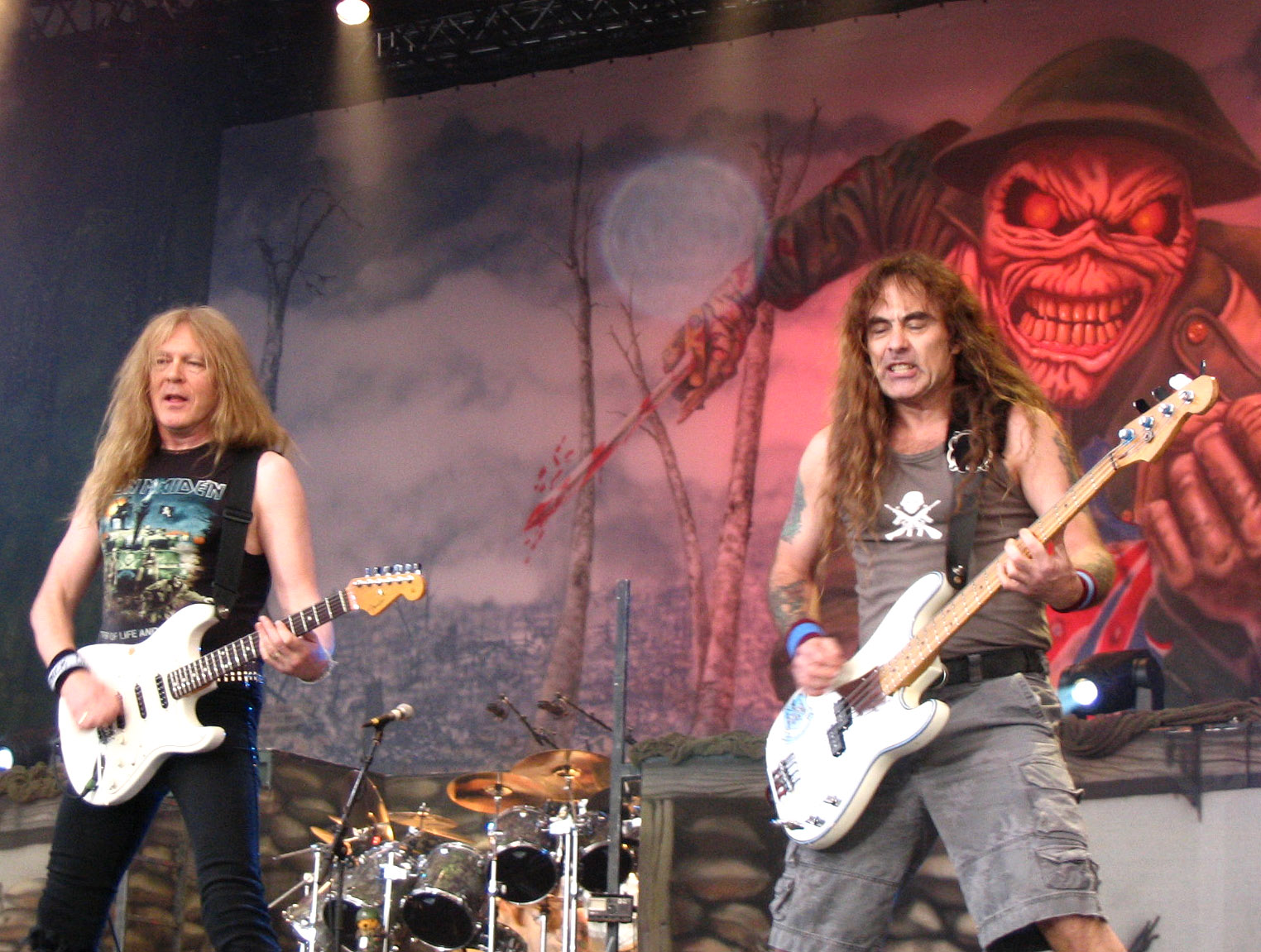
Iron Maiden performing at The Fields of Rock festival

Fields of Rock is a Dutch rock music festival. It was first conceived in 2002. Metallica's agent called, announcing that the band was planning to tour the Netherlands, and Metallica wanted to do a festival. At that point in time there really was not a suitable festival. And so Fields Of Rock was created. The location selected was the Goffertpark in Nijmegen.

The first festival in 2003 was an enormous success with Marilyn Manson, Slayer, Metallica and 41,000 visitors. In 2004 there was no Fields of Rock because there were not that many hard rock groups on tour. The entrance fee is high because Fields Of Rock is an expensive production, with a total of four stages, of which has two main stages, twenty bands, including well known international, national, and local metal.

After a two-year break Fields of Rock returned and took place from 16 to 17 June 2007. The number of stages was reduced to three, however the amount of the bands presented increased up to 36 among which were: Aiden, Black Label Society, Bloodsimple, Delain, DevilDriver, DragonForce, Dream Theater, Heaven and Hell, Ill Niño, Iron Maiden, Korn, Life of Agony, Machine Head, Megadeth, Motörhead, Ozzy Osbourne, Slayer, Suicidal Tendencies, Type O Negative and Velvet Revolver. However some organisational changes were made on the first day of the festival due to the late arrival of Papa Roach they were rescheduled to the Temple of Rock stage. It was also announced that due to problems with the bus Machine Head will not be performing. The gap between the Mean Stage bands was filled in by Dublin Death Patrol. Even though Machine Head performance was canceled the band appeared on Day 2 observing the performance of Korn from the back stage. The event was opened and led by the Spyderz vocalist and former Biohazard member Evan Seinfeld and his wife and former pornostar Tera Patrick.

The 2008 edition of Fields of Rock was cancelled, because the organization was not able to get big bands as headliners.

== Fields of Rock Bands By Year ==
=== 2003 (15 June) ===
==== Main stage ====
Metallica, Marilyn Manson, Stone Sour, Monster Magnet, Disturbed, Autumn

==== Tent Stage ====
Ministry, Prong, Opeth, Mudvayne, Arch Enemy, Nile, Subway to Sally, Strapping Young Lad

==== Small stage ====
Epica, Drowned, V-Male, Dark Day Rising, Cancelled, All Points North, Brainshake

=== 2005 (18 June) ===
==== Main stage A ====
Black Sabbath, Velvet Revolver, Motörhead, Alter Bridge

==== Main stage B ====
Rammstein, Audioslave, Slayer, Papa Roach

==== Tent stage ====
Flogging Molly, Machine Head, Chimaira, After Forever, The Dillinger Escape Plan, Mastodon, Team Sleep, Metal Church

==== MTV stage ====
Soulfly, Helmet, Dreadlock Pussy, Gorefest, Autumn, The*Ga*Ga*s, Skip the Rush

=== 2007 (16-17 June) ===
Saturday 16 June 2007

==== Mean stage ====
Iron Maiden, Slayer, Heaven and Hell, Dublin Death Patrol, After Forever, Lauren Harris

==== Temple of Rock ====
DragonForce, Kamelot, Aiden, Papa Roach, In this Moment, Panic Cell

==== Rage Stage ====
Pain Of Salvation, Mastodon, Fastway, Bloodsimple, The Spyderz

Sunday 17 June

==== Mean stage ====
Ozzy Osbourne, Velvet Revolver, Korn, Motörhead, Megadeth, Black Label Society

==== Temple of Rock ====
Dream Theater, Type O Negative, Hinder, Ill Niño, Amon Amarth, Delain

==== Rage Stage ====
Hatebreed, Suicidal Tendencies, Life of Agony & Spoiler NYC, DevilDriver, Hatebreed, Walls of Jericho, Volbeat
