= List of Reprise Records artists =

This is a list of current and former artists who have recorded for Reprise Records or one of its associated labels.

== 0–9 ==
- 40 Below Summer
- 54-40
- 8stops7

== A ==
- a-ha
- Ahmad (Giant/Reprise)
- Aimee Mann
- Air Supply (Giant/Reprise)
- Akina Nakamori
- Al Jarreau
- Alanis Morissette (Maverick/Reprise)
- Alexander Zonjic
- Allen Sherman
- Allen Toussaint
- American Bang
- American Music Club
- Ananda Shankar
- Andreas Johnson
- Arkarna
- Arlo Guthrie
- Army of Lovers (Giant/Reprise) (US/Canada)
- Art of Dying (Intoxication/Reprise)
- Ash (North America)
- Atlantic Starr

== B ==
- The B-52s
- Babble
- Babes in Toyland
- Baker Knight
- Barenaked Ladies
- Barney Kessel
- Bash & Pop (Sire/Reprise)
- The Beach Boys (Brother/Reprise)
- Beatmasters (Rhythm King/Sire/Reprise)
- Belly (Sire/Reprise)
- Ben Webster
- Bert Jansch
- Beth Nielsen Chapman
- Betty Boo (Rhythm King/Sire/Reprise) (US/Canada)
- Big Country (Giant/Reprise) (US/Canada)
- Big Daddy Kane (Cold Chillin'/Reprise)
- Big Head Todd and the Monsters (Giant/Reprise)
- Bigod 20 (Sire/Reprise)
- Bill Miller
- Billy Corgan
- Billy Hill (Reprise Nashville)
- Billy Strings
- Bing Crosby
- Black Sabbath (US/Canada)
- Blake Shelton (Reprise Nashville)
- Bloodsimple (Bullygoat/Reprise)
- Bob Mosley
- Bob Seger
- BoDeans (Slash/Reprise)
- Bone Thugs-N-Harmony (Asylum/Reprise)
- Bonnie McKee
- Book of Love
- Boredoms
- Brady Seals
- Brian Wilson (Sire/Reprise)
- Browning Bryant
- Bryan Ferry (US/Canada)
- BT (Perfecto/Kinetic/Reprise)
- Buddy Ebsen
- Buddy Greco
- Bulletboys

== C ==
- Caleb Kane
- Captain Beefheart
- Carlene Carter (Giant/Reprise Nashville)
- Cavo
- Chaka Khan
- Charice Pempengco
- Charice
- Charles Aznavour
- Charlie Daniels
- Cher (US/Australia)
- Chicago (Full Moon/Reprise)
- Christopher Cross
- Chris Cummings
- Chris Isaak
- Claudia Church
- Coldcut (Tommy Boy/Reprise)
- Color Me Badd (Giant/Reprise)
- Count Basie
- Craig David (US)
- Crime Mob (Crunk Incorporated/Reprise)
- The Cult (Sire/Reprise)

== D ==
- Da Bush Babees
- Daddy Cool
- Dario G (Kinetic/Reprise)
- Dave Gahan (Mute/Reprise) (US/Canada/Mexico)
- David Lee Roth
- David Sanborn
- Dean Martin
- Deborah Harry (Sire/Reprise)
- Debbie Reynolds
- Deftones
- The Del Fuegos (Slash/Reprise)
- Del Reeves
- Dennis Robbins
- Denny Laine (US/Canada)
- Depeche Mode (Mute/Sire/Reprise) (US/Canada/Mexico)
- Devendra Banhart
- Dinah Shore
- Dino, Desi & Billy
- Dio (US/Canada)
- Disturbed
- Divine Styler (Giant/Reprise)
- Don Ho & the Allies
- Donald Fagen
- Donna Loren
- The Dream Academy
- Drill Team
- Duane Eddy
- Duke Ellington
- Dwight Yoakam (Reprise Nashville)

== E ==
- Ed Sanders
- Eddi Reader
- Eisley
- The Electric Prunes
- Ella Fitzgerald
- Emmylou Harris (Reprise Nashville)
- Enya
- Enya (US)
- Erasure (Mute/Sire/Reprise) (US/Canada/Mexico)
- Eric Benét (Friday/Reprise)
- Eric Clapton (Duck/Reprise)
- Esquivel!
- Essra Mohawk
- Esthero
- Ethel Merman
- Eddie Cano

== F ==
- Faith No More (Slash/Reprise)
- Family
- Family of the Year
- Fanny
- Fats Domino
- The Farm (Sire/Reprise)
- Filter
- The First Edition
- Fleetwood Mac
- Flo & Eddie
- Force MDs (Tommy Boy/Reprise)
- The Foremen
- Françoise Hardy (US and Canada, leased from Vogue)
- Frank Sinatra (Founder)
- Frank Zappa (Bizarre/Reprise)
- Frankie Ballard (Reprise Nashville)
- The Fugs

== G ==
- Gerard Way
- Gloriana (Emblem/Reprise Nashville)
- Goldie Hawn
- Gordon Jenkins
- Gordon Lightfoot
- Grace (Perfecto/Kinetic/Reprise)
- Gram Parsons
- Grand Daddy I.U. (Cold Chillin'/Reprise)
- Green Day
- Greg Behrendt
- Groove Collective
- The GrooveGrass Boyz
- The GTOs
- The Guess Who
- Guster
- The Genius (Cold Chillin'/Reprise)

== H ==
- The Harold Betters Sound
- Heart
- HIM
- The Hi-Lo's
- Hindu Love Gods (Giant/Reprise)
- Hiroshima (Qwest/Reprise)
- The Hives (Burning Heart/Sire/Reprise)
- Hobo Johnson
- Houndmouth
- Hybrid (Kinetic/Reprise)

== I ==
- i5 (Giant/Reprise)
- Ice (In Bloom/Reprise)
- Idina Menzel
- Idiot Pilot
- The Incredible String Band
- Information Society (Tommy Boy/Reprise)
- Ivan Lins
- Iyaz

== J ==
- J Mascis
- Jacques Brel
- Jade (Giant/Reprise)
- James Iha
- Jane Siberry (outside Canada)
- Jay Rock
- Jeff Lynne
- Jeremy Jordan (Giant/Reprise)
- Jeremy Spencer
- Jessi Malay
- The Jesus and Mary Chain (Blanco y Negro/Reprise) (US)
- Jethro Tull (US/Canada)
- Jim Lauderdale
- Jimi Hendrix (US/Canada)
- The Jimi Hendrix Experience
- Jimmy Howes
- Jo Stafford
- Joe E. Lewis
- John Cale
- John Fahey
- John Renbourn
- John Sebastian
- Joni Mitchell
- Josephine Collective
- Josh Groban (143/Reprise)
- Josiah Leming
- Joy Division (Qwest/Reprise) (US/Canada)
- Jude Cole
- Juliet Roberts
- Justin Warfield (Qwest/Reprise)

== K ==
- Kara's Flowers
- Keely Smith
- Keiko Masuda (Japan)
- Kenny Rogers and The First Edition
- Kenny Rogers (Giant/Reprise Nashville)
- Kenny Wayne Shepherd
- Kevin Welch
- Kidsongs
- The Kinks (US)
- Kristin Hersh (Sire/Reprise)

== L ==
- L7 (Slash/Reprise)
- La India
- Lalaine
- The LeeVees
- Lenny Bruce
- Lil Scrappy (BME/Reprise)
- Linda Lewis
- Lindsey Buckingham
- Lisahall
- Little Richard
- Lord Finesse (Giant/Reprise)
- Lou Monte
- Lou Reed
- Lovecraft
- Luka Bloom
- Lush (4AD/Reprise)
- The Lynns

== M ==
- Mad Lion
- Mandy Moore
- Marc Almond (Sire/Reprise) (US/Canada)
- Maria Muldaur
- Martin L. Gore (Mute/Reprise) (US/Canada/Mexico)
- Mary Wells
- Master Ace (Cold Chillin'/Reprise)
- Mastodon
- Mavis Rivers
- The McGuire Sisters
- MC Hammer (Giant/Reprise)
- Men, Women & Children
- Me'shell Ndegéocello (Maverick/Reprise)
- The Meters
- Michael Bublé (143/Reprise)
- Michael Franks
- Michael McDonald
- Michael Peterson (Reprise Nashville)
- Michael White
- Michelle Branch
- Mike Oldfield (US)
- Millionaire (PIAS/Reprise)
- Miriam Makeba (US/Canada)
- Mis-Teeq
- Molly & the Heymakers
- Morcheeba
- Morgana King
- Morrissey (Sire/Reprise) (US/Canada)
- Mort Sahl
- Mudcrutch
- Mudhoney
- The Muffs
- Music Instructor (Kinetic/Reprise)
- My Chemical Romance

== N ==
- Nancy Sinatra
- Narada Michael Walden
- Neil Young
- Nelson Riddle
- Neon Hitch
- The Network
- Never Shout Never (Sire/Reprise)
- Nick Cave (North America)
- Nick Heyward
- Nico
- Noel Harrison
- Norman Greenbaum
- Nu Flavor
- Nubian M.O.B. (Cold Chillin'/Reprise)

== O ==
- Oasis (Big Brother/Reprise) (US/Canada)
- The Ocean Blue
- Orgy (Elementree/Reprise)
- The Other Two (Qwest/Reprise) (US/Canada)

== P ==
- The Paris Sisters
- Paul Brandt (Reprise Nashville)
- Paul Westerberg (Sire/Reprise)
- Pearls Before Swine
- The Pentangle
- Peter Green
- Powermad
- Primal Scream
- Pvris

== Q ==
- QDIII (Qwest/Reprise)

== R ==
- Ramblin' Jack Elliott
- Randy Newman
- Randy Scruggs
- The Ready Set (Decaydance/Sire/Reprise)
- Recoil (US/Canada)
- Regurgitator
- Renee Olstead
- The Rentals (Maverick/Reprise)
- Repercussions
- The Replacements (Sire/Reprise)
- Revolting Cocks (Sire/Reprise)
- Rhino Bucket
- Ric Ocasek
- Richard Pryor
- Rick James
- Ricki Lee Jones
- Ride (Sire/Reprise) (outside UK/Ireland)
- Rob Dougan (US/Canada)
- Roger Troutman
- Rosemary Clooney
- Rosie Flores (Reprise Nashville)
- Roxanne Shanté (Cold Chillin'/Reprise)
- Roxy Music (US/Canada)
- Rüfüs Du Sol
- Rumiko Koyanagi
- Ry Cooder

== S ==
- S. David Cohen
- Saafir (Qwest/Reprise)
- Sammy Davis Jr.
- Sandie Shaw
- Santana
- Sasha Alexander
- Seal
- The Secret Machines
- Serj Tankian
- Shawn Camp
- Shootyz Groove (Kinetic/Reprise)
- Shorty Rogers
- Simon Dawes (Record Collection/Reprise)
- Single File
- Sixpence None the Richer (Squint/Reprise)
- The Smashing Pumpkins (Martha's Music/Reprise)
- The Smiths (Sire/Reprise) (US/Canada)
- Snake River Conspiracy
- Sonny & Cher
- Sopwith Camel
- Soupy Sales
- The Spike Drivers
- The Spill Canvas
- Static-X
- Steely Dan (Giant/Reprise)
- Stevie Nicks
- Stills-Young Band
- Streetwalkers
- Stress
- Submarine (Kinetic/Reprise)
- Sweetwater

== T ==
- T. Rex (US/Canada)
- Taja Sevelle (Paisley Park/Reprise)
- Tanita Tikaram
- Tarnation
- Tegan and Sara (Vapor/Reprise)
- Texas Tornados (Reprise Nashville)
- Theo Bikel
- Tia Carrere
- Tiffany Affair
- The Time (Paisley Park/Reprise)
- Times Two
- Tiny Tim
- Harlow
- Tom Lehrer
- Tom Paxton
- Tom Petty & The Heartbreakers
- Tom Tom Club (Sire/Reprise)
- Tony Banks (Giant/Reprise) (US/Canada)
- Tracy Nelson
- Trini Lopez
- Twin Shadow

== U ==
- The Used

== V ==
- V Factory
- V.I.C. (Young Mogul/Reprise)
- Victoria Shaw
- Violent Femmes (Slash/Reprise)
- Vonda Shepard
- The Vogues

== W ==
- Walter Becker
- Warren Zevon (Giant/Reprise)
- Waterlillies (Sire/Reprise)
- Weezer (Crush/Reprise)
- The West Coast Pop Art Experimental Band
- Wilco
- The Wild Feathers
- Wild Man Fischer
- The Wild Swans (Sire/Reprise)
- Wynona Carr

== Y ==
- Yaz (US/Canada)
- YGz

== Z ==
- Zapp
- Zwan (Martha's Music/Reprise)

== See also ==
- Reprise Records
