= Swallow (American band) =

American rock band

- Origin: Boston, Massachusetts
- Genres: blues-rock
- Years active: 1969–1974
- Label: Warner Bros. Records
- Past members: George Leh; Phil Greene; Parker Wheeler; Bob Camacho; Vern Miller; Mick Aranda; Kerry Blount; Jay Dewald; Andy Harp; Gordon Kennedy; David Woodford; Bill Scism; J. D. Smith; Ted Connell; Rick Engler

Swallow was a rock band from the Boston area. Formed in 1969, they were extant for five years, touring with Traffic, the Supremes and B.B. King and headlining area venues on their own.

Somewhat unusually for a rock band, Swallow included a horn section, so there were initially eleven members in the band. Band members included Vern Miller from the Remains who wrote most of the band's songs, and blind blues singer George Leh.

Swallow released two albums on Warner Bros. Records. Their first album, Out of the Nest, released in 1972, included a contribution by Jeff Baxter on one song, "Come Home Woman". Another album, Swallow, with one Phil Greene produced single "Yes, I'll Say It" followed in 1973.

Both albums were re-released on CD in 2010 on Wounded Bird Records.
