= Control Freq =

American musical group

Control Freq (pronounced "control freek", i.e. freak) is an American musical group.

== Description ==
Based in Detroit, Control Freq was founded and led by the club DJ/producer Static Revenger (a.k.a. Dennis White, a.k.a. Latroit). Their music is considered techno or drum and bass. White's previous band was Charm Farm, "pop-rockers who took their cues from...techno, ’80s new wave, even baggy Brit-pop."

== Music ==
Their song, "Satellite", is on AE Mix 1, a promotional album by the American clothing company/retailer American Eagle Outfitters. The song also is featured in the video game Audition Online Dance Battle (Nexon America).

== Discography ==
=== Albums/EPs ===
- Sweetest Day EP (F111 Records, 1999)
- Freq Show (Warner Bros., 2000)

=== Singles ===
- "Satellite"
- "Sweetest Day"
- "Do You Fear Me?"
- "We Accept You"
- "Welcome to the Freq Show"
