= I Don't Wanna Wait (Hanaumi song) =

Single by Hanaumi

from the album Hanaumi
- Released: 1996
- Genre: Eurodance; reggae fusion
- Length: 3:27
- Label: Columbia; Epic
- Songwriter(s): Lars E. Ludvigsen; Mikkel S. Eriksen
- Producer(s): Lars E. Ludvigsen; Mikkel S. Eriksen

Hanaumi singles chronology
"I Don't Wanna Wait" (1996)	"Fisherman's Net" (1996)

Music video
- "I Don't Wanna Wait" on YouTube

"I Don't Wanna Wait" is a song by Norwegian singer Hanaumi (a.k.a. Hanne Qvigstad). Written and produced by Lars E. Ludvigsen and Mikkel S. Eriksen, it was released by Columbia and Epic as the debut single from the singer's first album, Hanaumi (1996). The song was a radio hit, but did not reach the Norwegian singles chart VG-lista. It was also released in Japan.

== Track listing ==
- CD maxi
1. "I Don't Wanna Wait" – 3:27
2. "I Don't Wanna Wait" (Moodmix) – 4:20
3. "I Don't Wanna Wait" (Clubmix) – 5:46
4. "I Don't Wanna Wait" (Dubmix) – 5:12

== Charts ==
Chart performance for "I Don't Wanna Wait"
Chart (1996)	Peak position
Norway (Ti i skuddet)	4
