= Fourplay (disambiguation) =

Fourplay is an American jazz band.

Fourplay or 4 Play may also refer to:

== Music ==
- Fourplay (Fourplay album), the self-titled debut album by the above group
- Fourplay (The Sensational Alex Harvey Band album), 1977
- Fourplay (Double Exposure album)
- Four Play (album), a 1990 jazz album by Clifford Jordan, Richard Davis, James Williams and Ronnie Burrage
- FourPlay String Quartet, an Australian rock band
- 4 Play, a 2005 album by Berlin
- 4 Play (Cold Sweat album), a 1991 studio album by Craig Harris
- 4 Play (Cookies album), a 2004 album by Cookies
- 4Play, a 2014 album by rapper Gashi
- Christopher "4Play" Myers, a former member of Pretty Ricky

== Other uses ==
- Fourplay (2001 film), a comedy film directed by Mike Binder
- Fourplay (2018 film), an American comedy-drama film
- Fourplay (web series), a 2017 comedy web series on ALTBalaji
- Four Play, a 2010 novel by Maya Banks
- Fourplay, an online game by OMGPop
- 4 Play (film), a 2010 film directed by Frank Rajah Arase
- 4 Play (TV series), a 2024 Kenyan crime drama

== See also ==
- Forplay (disambiguation)
- Foreplay, sexual acts
- Fore Play, a 1975 American comedy film
- "Foreplay/Long Time", a 1976 song by Boston
