= Crawford/West =

- Origin: United States
- Genres: Country
- Years active: 1997–1998
- Labels: Warner Bros.
- Past members: Rick Crawford; Kenny West

Crawford/West was an American country music duo consisting of Rick Crawford (from Texas) and Kenny West (from Arkansas). Signed to Warner Bros. Records, they released their first single, "Summertime Girls," in May 1997. The song peaked at No. 75 on the Billboard Hot Country Singles & Tracks chart in the United States and No. 91 on the RPM Country Tracks chart in Canada. A second single, "Healing End," was released in June 1998, but failed to chart. Two months later, the duo requested to be released from their recording contract with Warner Bros.

== Discography ==
=== Singles ===
Year	Single	Peak chart positions	
Year	Single	US Country	CAN Country
1997	"Summertime Girls"	75	91
1998	"Healing End"	—	—
"—" denotes releases that did not chart

=== Music videos ===
Year	Video	Director
1997	"Summertime Girls"	
1998	"Healing End"	Jim Shea
