= PlayN =

Java programming framework

- Original author: Google
- Initial release: January 19, 2011
- Stable release: 2.0.8 / June 21, 2023; 2 years ago
- Repository: github.com/playn/playn
- Written in: Java
- Operating system: Linux, Windows, Mac OS X
- License: Apache License 2.0
- Website: playn.io

PlayN is an open source Java software framework and set of libraries intended to create multi-platform games and distributed under the Apache License 2.0. It was started on January 19, 2011, as a game abstraction library built over GWT and was previously named Forplay. As of January 2024, its current version is 2.0.8.

== History ==
Forplay was created in January 2011. In August 2011, the project was forked and rebranded as PlayN.

== Name ==
The name PlayN comes from the project's motto "Cross platform game library for N>=5 platforms", as it claims to build games for five platforms: Java SE, HTML 5, Flash, Android and iOS.
