= Partybaby =

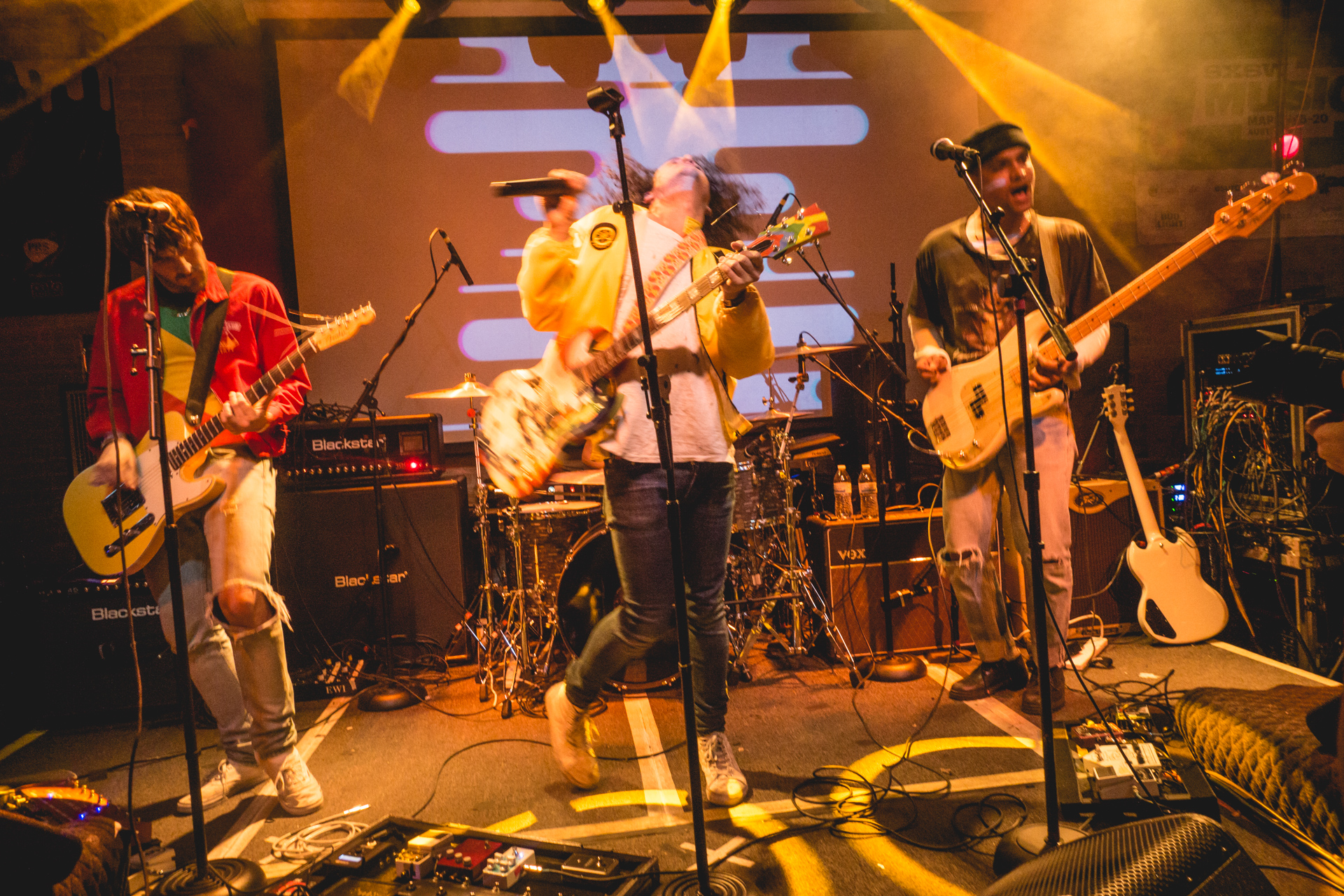

Background information
- Origin: Los Angeles, California
- Genre: Indie rock
- Label: Warner Bros. Records
- Members: Jamie Schefman; Noah Gersh; Chelsea Davis; James Hurst
- Website: www.partybabymusic.com

Partybaby is an American indie rock band from Los Angeles, California. The group was formed by former Portugal. The Man guitarist Noah Gersh and producer and engineer Jamie Schefman. Partybaby released its first album, The Golden Age of Bullshit, in September 2016.

== History ==
Partybaby was formed by members Noah Gersh and Jamie Schefman. Gersh is the former guitarist for Portugal. The Man while Schefman was a producer and engineer working with groups such as Thirty Seconds to Mars. Both were working together on a song for Christina Aguilera when their frustration spurred them to write the song Your Old Man, which became the group's first single released in late 2015.

Partybaby played SXSW in 2016 and toured nationally with The Academy Is. They also toured with SWMRS and Wavves. The group had a headline tour in the United Kingdom in early 2016, playing shows that included The Great Escape Festival and The Finsbury prior to a national tour in the United States. They also released their debut album, The Golden Age of Bullshit, in September 2016.

== Discography ==
=== Albums ===
List of albums
Title	Album details
The Golden Age Of Bullshit	Released: 2 September 2016; Label: Warner Bros. Records; Format: Digital download

=== Singles ===
Title	Year	Peak chart positions	Album
I Don't Wanna Wait	2016	—	Non-album single
Everything's All Right	2015	—	Non-album single
Your Old Man	2015	—	Non-album single
